= François Riday Busseron =

Canadien fur trader

François Riday Busseron (Bosseron, Beauceron) was a Canadien fur trader, general store operator, and militia captain in the American village of Vincennes. He supported the Americans during the American Revolution and funded the first American flag made in Indiana. As a U.S. citizen, he would serve as a judge in the court of general quarter sessions.

Busseron was born in 1748, when the Northwest Territory was still part of New France. The territory became the domain of the British Empire following the French and Indian War, but Busseron elected to stay. On hearing the news of the American Revolution and the French alliance from Father Gibault, however, Busseron sided for the Americans.

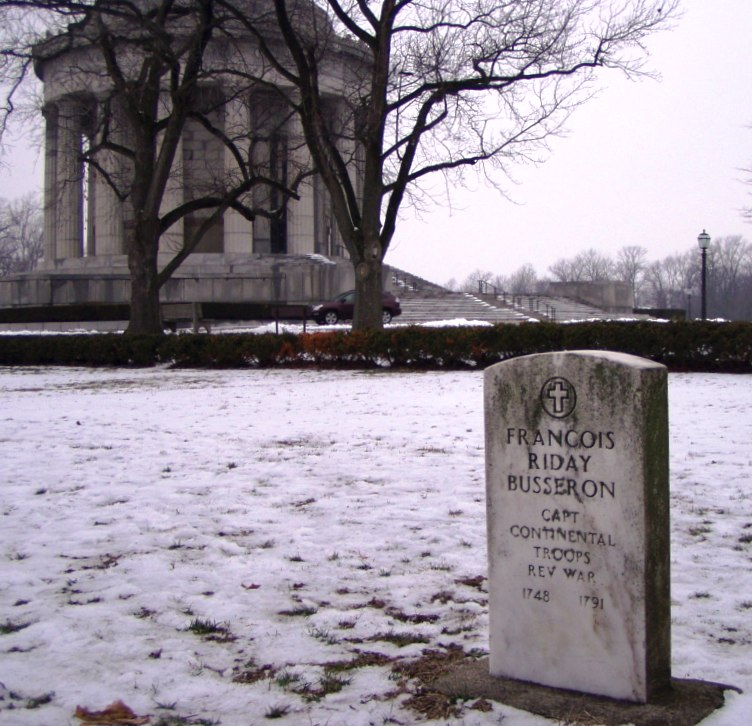

When Lt-Governor Henry Hamilton retook control of Fort Sackville and confiscated local supplies of ammunition, Busseron, along with Colonel Legras, "buried the greater part of their powder and ball." George Rogers Clark and his American forces arrived on 23 February 1779, his black powder ruined while wading across the Wabash River. Clark wrote of Legras and Busseron, "We found ourselves well supplied by those gentlemen." Hamilton noted not only that Busseron supplied Clark with powder, but that he also offered the services of himself and 75 men of the Vincennes militia, which greatly discouraged the Canadians inside Fort Sackville.

Busseron was involved in many of the Vincennes militia actions, including a mission led by Captain Leonard Helm that captured Hamilton's reinforcements on the Wabash River. When Clark withdrew his Virginia troops in Spring 1780, he left Busseron in charge of the fort- now renamed Fort Patrick Henry.

By 1781, the Canadian residents of Vincennes had become frustrated with the Virginia government, depreciated US currency, and the Virginia militias that used or took their property without proper compensation. The leading citizens of Vincennes, including François Busseron, signed a letter of grievances to the governor of Virginia. Over the course of the American Revolution, Busseron extended up to $12,000 credit to Clark. None of this was ever repaid to him. He and all but one of his children died in poverty.

Busseron died in 1791 at age 43. Joseph Somes says he died "a broken and much disillusioned man." He is buried near the Old French Cathedral in Vincennes, next to the George Rogers Clark National Historic Park.

Busseron Street, in Vincennes, is named in honor of François Busseron. Busseron Creek and Busseron Township, both in Knox County, Indiana, are also named for him.

== Notes ==
Busseron's signature
