= Philippe DeJean =

Philippe DeJean (1736 – c.1809 or later) was a judge in Fort Detroit until he was captured during the American Revolution.

He was born 5 April 1736 in Toulouse, France, the son of Philippe Dejean and Jeanne de Rocques de Carbouere. His father was a legal officer, and may have given his son legal training.

DeJean was living in North American by 1761, and was a merchant in Detroit by 1766. By that time, the Seven Years' War between Great Britain and France was over, and DeJean was under the jurisdiction of Great Britain. He was appointed Justice of the Peace in April 1767.

As the town surrounding Fort Detroit grew, DeJean's powers expanded, and he was soon appointed as Judge. The American Revolution created a crisis situation in which DeJean's authority as Judge and Henry Hamilton's authority as Lt-Governor went unchecked. Notably, in 1777 he executed Ann Wyley and a male accomplice for mere theft, in order to set an example to others. DeJean's reputation as a harsh judge who sometimes overstepped legal bounds was noticed beyond Detroit. Governor Guy Carleton criticized both DeJean and Hamilton for unjust and illegal acts, and they were both indicted in Montreal for "being tyrannical and acting illegally"

Hamilton left Detroit on an expedition to recapture Post Vincennes, South of Detroit along the Wabash River, which had recently declared its support for the Americans. DeJean, perhaps aware of his precarious legal position without the support of Hamilton, accompanied a convoy of reinforcements. Hamilton was captured at Fort Sackville (Vincennes) by Colonel George Rogers Clark, and DeJean- along with some papers he neglected to destroy- was captured on the Wabash by Captain Leonard Helm.

DeJean was held as a prisoner in Williamsburg for four months, after which time he was paroled because he was considered sympathetic to the American cause. He returned to Vincennes, but did not return to Detroit for fear of prosecution for his abuses of power. His family, however, was not permitted to leave Detroit, and it appears that DeJean finally returned by late 1780.

Detroit court records from July 1790 indicate that he lived outside British dominions. Various records indicate that DeJean may have returned to France for a time, and/or may have relocated to Vincennes. An 1807 census of Vincennes lists Philip Dejean, Male over 21. The Dictionary of Canadian Biography lists his death in or after 1809, when documents cease to list his name.
