= George Rogers Clark Flag =

Banner associated with George Rogers Clark

George Rogers Clark flag
- Use: Small vexillological symbol or pictogram in black and white showing the different uses of the flag
- Design: 13 alternating red and green stripes
- Designed by: François Riday Busseron

The George Rogers Clark Flag is a red and green striped banner in the model of American Flags commonly associated with George Rogers Clark, although Colonel Clark did not campaign under these colors. The "Clark" flag was made in Vincennes, Indiana, and likely flew over Fort Sackville even before Clark arrived.

== Origins ==
On 12 November 1778, Vincennes resident François Bosseron recorded the following items under the heading ""1778 fournie au Cap Helm pour les Compagnie des États"":

- Paid to St. Marie for 5 ells of red serge for the company flag at 9 livres; 45 livres
- Paid to M. Dajenett for 3 3/4 ells of green serge at 10 livres; 37 Livres 10
- Paid to Madame Godare for the making of the flag; 25 Livres

This flag was designed by Captain Leonard Helm, who held Fort Sackville until forced to surrender to Lieutenant Governor Henry Hamilton. Although historians are not sure exactly what it looked like, most US flags were based on the "stripes of rebellion." Helm's design was clear enough that Hamilton recognized two on his approach to Vincennes, one on a boat and one on the fort. One of these may have been Bosseron's flag, although Father Pierre Gibault may have brought a flag with him. Captain Helm had earlier brought a United States flag to Ouiatenon, so it is possible that he also had brought one to Vincennes. When Hamilton took the fort, he allowed Helm to take down "the continental flag" before raising the British flag.

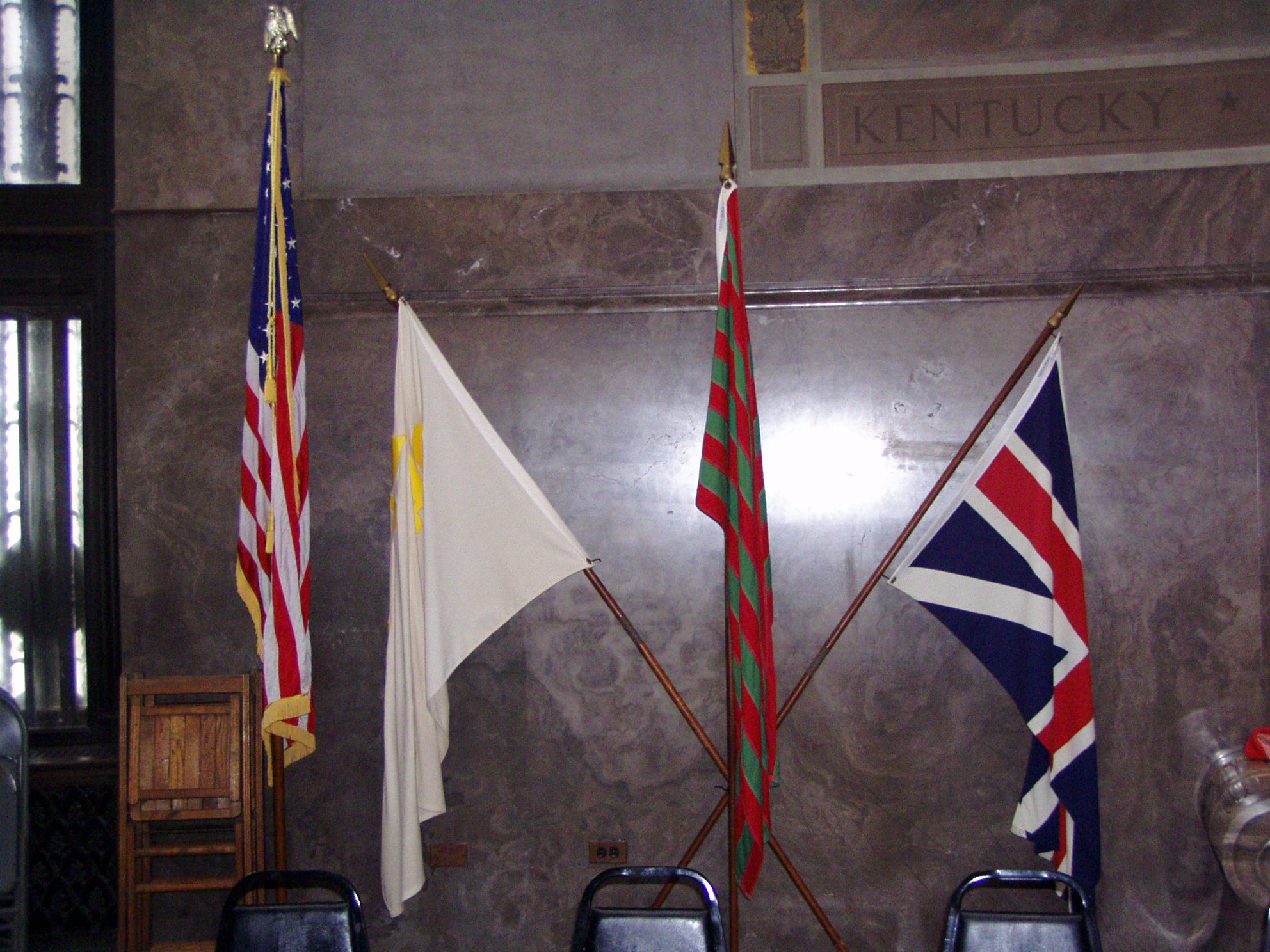
Clark flag displayed inside the George Rogers Clark National Historic Park

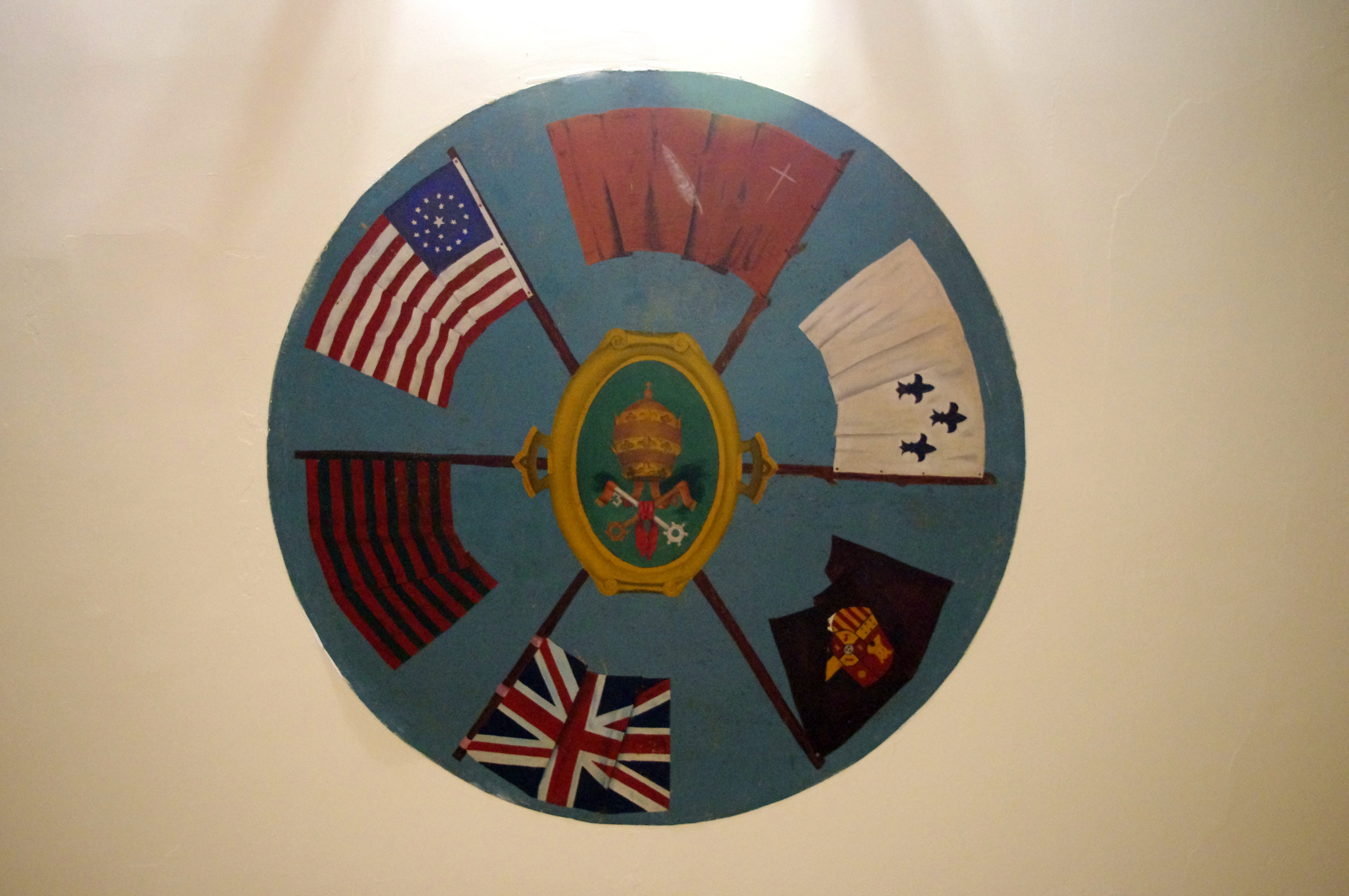
Artwork on the St. Francis Xavier Basilica chapel ceiling featuring the George Rogers Clark flag alongside other historic flags.

== Colors ==
The choice of a red and green flag instead of red and white flag remains a mystery. It is possible that there simply was not enough white serge available in Vincennes at the time. It is worth noting, however, that whereas Colonel Clark had offered a red and white belts to American Indians in Cahokia to represent war or peace, Captain Helm presented the Wabash Indians with a red or green belts. On December 27 at Vincennes, a Piankeshaw chief presented Lt-Gov Hamilton with red and green wampum, which was said to represent the Wabash River.

The stripes, themselves, were a defining feature of British American flags even before the Revolution, and many military banners used by Americans featured stripes of differing colors. Records describe flags similar or identical to this in the 13 colonies. It is possible that Busseron ordered the banner for his own militia unit in Vincennes, when they declared for the United States.

== George Rogers Clark ==
Which flag design Clark's men actually marched behind is not known. In his memoir, Clark says he had 10 or 12 sets of colors when they took Vincennes. Some theorize that he probably marched under the flag of Virginia, his home state, but Lt-Gov Henry Hamilton refers to several "American" flags in his journal entries as he leads his expedition down the Wabash River, including a "rebel flag" he received at Ouiatenon on 4 December. When Clark arrived in Vincennes on 23 February 1779, he used many banners to give the impression of a large army. Clark's Captain Bowman notes in his journal that an "American flag" was raised over Ft Sackville on 25 February 1779, but does not describe it.

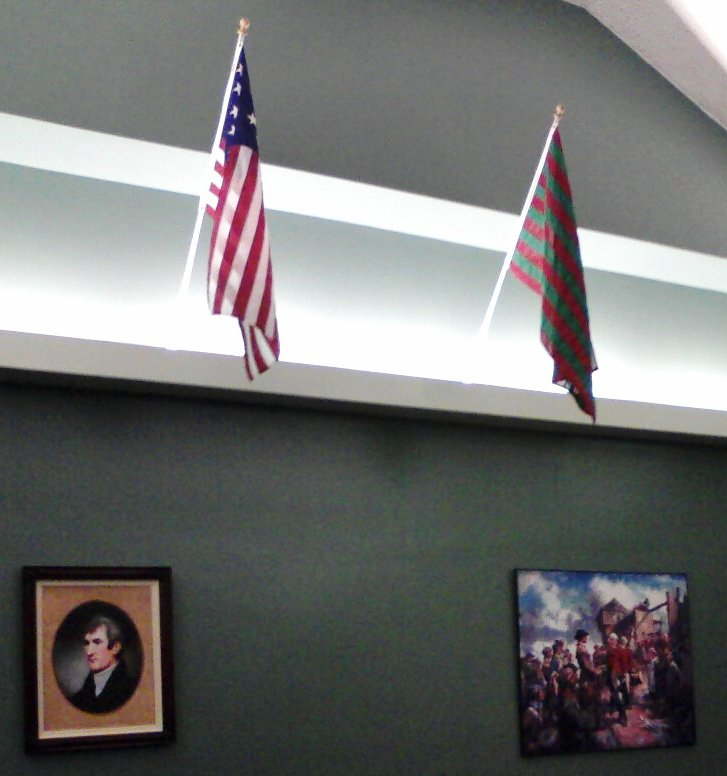
Presentation room at Locust Grove, Clark's final residence.

Of all the flags which may have been used during Clark's Illinois campaign, the 13-striped, red and green banner is the only banner historically documented, and was one of the first "American Flags" flown in the modern State of Indiana. The pattern has been flown by Indiana National Guard units deployed to both Iraq and Afghanistan. Even though Clark, himself, probably never used it, the flag bears his name and is sold by flag retailers as a "George Rogers Clark flag." It is often flown at events in Indiana and Illinois to represent Clark's historic ties with those states. A red and green flag is still flown at the George Rogers Clark National Historic Park, and at the Locust Grove plantation near Louisville, Kentucky, where George Rogers Clark died.

== Sources ==
- Barnhart, John D. and Riker, Dorothy L. Indiana to 1816. The Colonial Period. ©1971, Indiana Historical Society. ISBN 0-87195-109-6
- Mastai, Boleslaw and Marie-Louise D'Otrange 'The Stars and the Stripes. The American Flag as Art and as History from the Birth of the Republic to the Present' ©1973. Alfred A. Knopf, New York. ISBN 0-394-47217-9
- Shaw, Janet P. (editor) Account Book of Francis Bosseron Edited by Janet P. Shaw 1929. In the original French and in translation.
- Somes, Joseph Henry VandeBurgh. Old Vincennes Graphic Books, New York. 1962. LCCN 62-18417.
