= Siege of Fort Vincennes =

Battle in the American Revolutionary War

Coordinates: 38.679194°N 87.535594°W

Battle of Vincennes
- Part of the American Revolutionary War
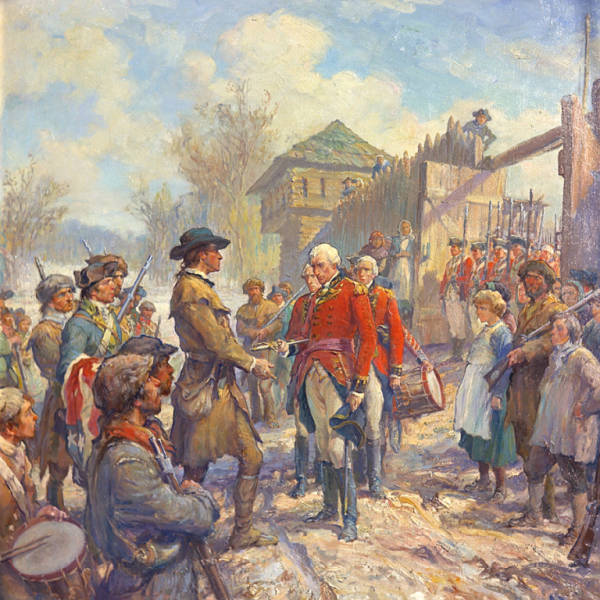
- Fall of Fort Sackville by Frederick Coffay Yohn
Date	23–25 February 1779
Location	Vincennes, Indiana
Result	American victory

Belligerents
United States	Great Britain

Commanders and leaders
George Rogers Clark; Joseph Bowman	Henry Hamilton (surrendered); Jehu Hay

Strength
170 militia	33 regulars 36 militia

Casualties and losses
4	11 killed 5 wounded 79 captured

The siege of Fort Sackville, also known as the siege of Fort Vincennes or the Battle of Vincennes, was an American Revolutionary War frontier battle fought in present-day Vincennes, Indiana. In February 1779, an American militia led by Lieutenant Colonel George Rogers Clark defeated the British garrison of Fort Sackville commanded by Lieutenant Governor Henry Hamilton. Clark surprised the fort after a gruelling march from Kaskaskia, and following the execution of four Odawa captives, forced Hamilton's surrender.

== Prelude ==
In January 1778, Lieutenant Colonel George Rogers Clark of the Kentucky militia was authorized by Virginia Governor Patrick Henry to lead an expedition to seize the British outposts of Kaskaskia and Cahokia on the Mississippi River. Despite having recruited only 175 men, Clark captured Kaskaskia on July 4 and Cahokia two days later. The decrepit stockade of Fort Sackville, located in Vincennes on the Wabash River 180 miles east of Kaskakia, was occupied by the end of the month by a small detachment led by Captain Leonard Helm. In response, British Lieutenant Governor Henry Hamilton set out from Fort Detroit on October 7 with 40 Detroit Volunteers led by Captain Guillaume LaMothe, 85 militia led by Major Jehu Hay, a small Royal Artillery detachment, and 60 Odawa and Ojibwe warriors. He was later joined by a 33-man detachment from the 8th Regiment of Foot, and roughly 200 Miami, Potawatomi, and Shawnee warriors accompanied by British Indian Department officers. Hamilton surprised Fort Sackville's small garrison and retook Vincennes on December 17. Work began immediately on restoring the fort. Hamilton decided to winter at Vincennes with the British regulars, while most of the militia and Indigenous warriors returned home.

It was several weeks before Clark learned that Vincennes had been retaken. His informant was Francis Vigo, a St. Louis trader who had briefly been held prisoner by the British. Vigo provided Clarke with information about the strength of Fort Sackville's garrison and Hamilton's plan to retake Kaskaskia and Cahokia in the spring.

Clark decided that he needed to launch a surprise winter attack on Vincennes. He explained his reasons in a letter to Governor Henry:

I know the case is desperate; but, sir, we must either quit the country or attack Mr. Hamilton. No time is to be lost. Were I sure of a reinforcement, I should not attempt it. Who knows what fortune will do for us? Great things have been affected by a few men well conducted. Perhaps we may be fortunate. We have this consolation that our cause is just, and that our country will be grateful and not condemn our conduct, in case we fall through; if so, this country as well as Kentucky, I believe, is lost.

== Expedition ==
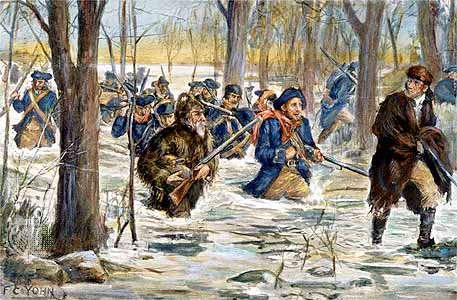
Clark's march to Vincennes has been depicted in many paintings such as this illustration by Frederick Coffay Yohn.

On February 5, 1779, Clark set out for Vincennes with Captain Joseph Bowman and 170 men, nearly half of them French volunteers from Kaskaskia. Later, in a letter to his friend and mentor George Mason, Clark described his feeling for the journey as one of "forlorn hope," as his men were faced with a long trek over land that was "in many parts flowing with water." The day after Clark and Bowman began their march, 40 men under Captain John Rogers departed Kaskaskia in the armed keelboat Willing. They headed upriver towards Vincennes along the Ohio and Wabash rivers but failed to arrive in time for the attack.

Clark led his men east from Kaskaskia to Vincennes, a journey of about 180 miles (290 km). Clark later recalled that the weather was "wet, but, fortunately, not cold for the season" but found "a great part of the plains under water several inches deep." This made the men's march "difficult and very fatiguing." Provisions were carried on pack horses supplemented by wild game shot by hunting parties. They reached the Little Wabash River on February 13 and found it had burst its banks, flooding an area about 5 miles (8.0 km) wide. They built a large canoe to shuttle men and supplies across the river. The next few days were especially trying. Provisions were running low, and the men were continually forced to wade through water. They reached the Embarras River on February 17. They were now only 9 miles (14 km) from Fort Sackville but the river was too high to ford. They followed the Embarrass downstream to the Wabash. Spirits were low. They had been without food for the last two days, and Clark struggled to keep men from deserting. Clark later wrote that: "I conducted myself in such a manner that caused the whole to believe that I had no doubt of success, which kept their spirits up." Even so, a February 20 entry in Captain Bowman's journal describes the men in camp as "very quiet but hungry; some almost in despair; many of the creole volunteers talking of returning." By February 22, Bowman reports that they still have "No provisions yet. Lord help us!" and that "those that were weak and famished from so much fatigue went in the canoes" as they headed towards Vincennes.

On February 20, a hunting party from Vincennes was captured. They told Clark that the British were unaware of Clark's presence and that the inhabitants of Vincennes were sympathetic to the American cause. The next day, Clark and his men used the hunters' canoe and an abandoned canoe to cross the Wabash, leaving their pack horses behind. They proceeded towards Vincennes, sometimes in water up to their shoulders. The last few days were the hardest. They encountered a flooded plain about 4 miles (6.4 km) wide, and used the canoes to shuttle exhausted men across. Shortly before reaching Vincennes, another hunter was captured who informed Clark that the British remained unaware of the American presence. Clark sent the man ahead with a letter to the inhabitants of Vincennes, warning them that everyone should stay in their homes unless they wanted to be considered an enemy. The message was read in the public square. No one went to the fort to warn Hamilton.

== Siege ==
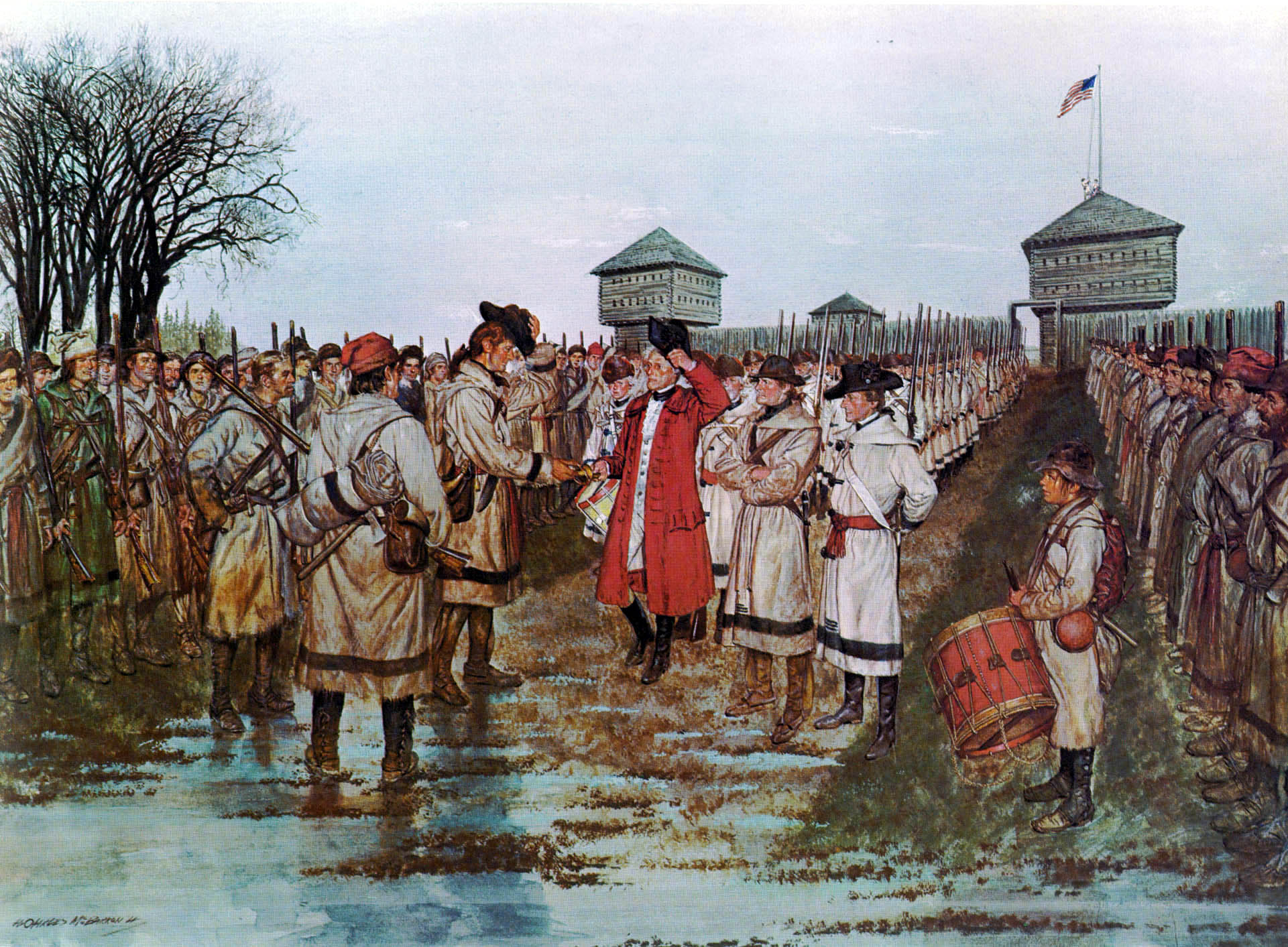
Lieutenant Governor Henry Hamilton surrenders to Colonel George Rogers Clark, February 25, 1779, painting by Hugh Charles McBarron Jr.

Clarke entered Vincennes on the evening of February 23. While most of Clark's men secured the village, small detachments stealthily approached the fort, took cover behind nearby fences and buildings and opened fire.

The attack on Fort Sackville came as a surprise to Hamilton even though the day before a patrol had captured two Virginians and had seen campfires 12 miles south of the fort. He initially believed that the gunfire was caused by a "drunken frolic of the inhabitants" but after a sergeant was slightly wounded realized the fort was under attack and ordered his men to return fire.

British artillery fire was able to dislodge some of Clark's men from their position near the village's church but was otherwise ineffective. The Americans responded by firing through the fort's open portholes, wounding some of the gunners. Shooting continued through the night but slacked off in the hours before dawn. A scouting party that Hamilton had sent out on February 22 to investigate the report of campfires was able to infiltrate through enemy lines to the fort, however, two were captured.

Young Tobacco, a Piankeshaw chief, reportedly offered to assist in the attack. Clark rejected the offer, likely due to his well-known hatred of Indigenous people. He did, however, accept help from the villagers when they supplied dry gunpowder.

About mid-morning on February 24, Clark sent a demand for unconditional surrender to Hamilton under a flag of truce. Hamilton was warned that should the fort's supplies or papers be destroyed, he could "expect no mercy, for by Heavens you shall be treated as a Murtherer.” Hamilton refused to surrender. Although the British regulars enthusiastically supported their commander's decision, the militia who were inside the fort were unwilling to continue fighting since many of their relations were openly assisting Clark. With seven of his regulars wounded, little hope for reinforcement, and a militia who he later called "treacherous cowards," Hamilton sent out a letter offering terms; asking for a three-day truce and a meeting with Clark. Clark repeated his demand for unconditional surrender but did offer to meet Hamilton. Meanwhile, an unsuspecting Odawa scouting party that had set out from Vincennes weeks earlier were ambushed as they returned to the village. Several were killed or wounded and six or seven were taken prisoner. Clark then had four of the prisoners summarily executed within sight of the fort's main gate.

Clark would later justify the killings by claiming that the Indigenous warriors were carrying fresh scalps. In his journal, Hamilton reported that Clark or one of his officers used a tomahawk to personally murder at least one of the four, and that Clark arrived for their meeting afterwards "all bloody and sweating... his hands and face still reeking from the human sacrifice in which he had acted as chief priest." While neither Clark or Bowman provided any details, Jacob Schieffelin, a Lieutenant in the British Indian Department who witnessed the murders, stated that Clark wielded the tomahawk.

Clark once again demanded unconditional surrender and swore that should he have to storm the fort, "not a single man should be spared." After Hamilton indicated his willingness to fight it out, a compromise was reached wherein the British would "deliver themselves up Prisoners of War and March out with their Arms and Acoutriments." The following morning Hamilton marched his men out of the fort and formally surrendered to Clark. A total of 79 men were taken prisoner. Clark ordered the American flag raised over the fort and renamed it Fort Patrick Henry.

In celebration of Clark's victory, the Americans fired a salute from a British 6-pounder gun. The salute accidentally ignited some gunpowder charges, injuring Bowman and five others. Bowman died five months later from the severe burns he suffered in the accident.

== Aftermath ==
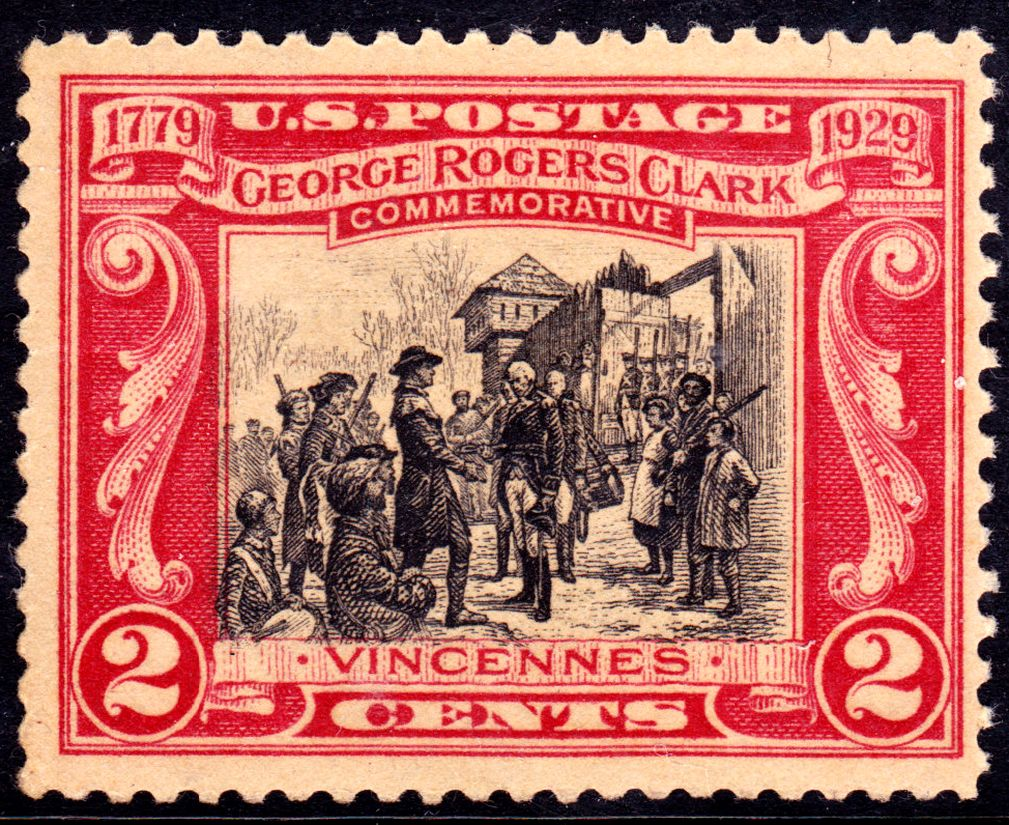
1929 American postage stamp designed by Frederick Coffay Yohn commemorating the 150th anniversary of the siege.

Clark ordered Hamilton, Hay, LaMothe and 25 others from the Indian Department and 8th Regiment escorted to Williamsburg, Virginia. The other prisoners were paroled and allowed to return to Detroit.

Hamilton was treated as a criminal rather than a prisoner of war due to false claims that he paid Britain's Indigenous allies for scalps. The Virginia Council, headed by Thomas Jefferson, ordered Hamilton and LaMothe placed in irons and confined to the Williamsburg jail. These harsh measures were relaxed several weeks later due to the intervention of George Washington. Lamothe was paroled in October 1779. Hamilton and Hay accepted parole to New York in October 1780 and were officially exchanged in the spring of 1781.

The capture of Fort Sackville without loss of life was Clark's most significant military achievement during the war and became the source of his reputation as a military hero. Early historians proclaimed him "Conqueror of the Northwest," but tended to overemphasize his accomplishments. William Hayden English, among others, attributed Britain's ceding of the territory northwest of the Ohio Country in the Treaty of Paris to Clark's exploits., however, most historian agree that Clark's successes were not a factor in the negotiations.

Clark had high hopes after his recapture of Vincennes. "This stroke", he wrote "will nearly put an end to the Indian War. Had I men enough to take advantage of the present confusion of the Indian nations, I would silence of the whole in two months." The capture of Kaskaskia, Cahokia and Vincennes, however, did little to curtail Indigenous raids. Clark viewed his victory at Vincennes as a step towards the capture of Fort Detroit. He knew that if Fort Detroit was taken, the British ability to supply its Indigenous allies would be severely limited. Clark repeatedly attempted to organize campaigns against Detroit, but even with the support of Virginia's governor he was never given sufficient men and supplies.

Following Clark's victory, the Virginia General Assembly gave official status to the region northwest of the Ohio River and named it Illinois County. John Todd, who had been with Clark at Vincennes, was appointed as the county's administrator even his authority was effectively limited to Vincennes and the settlements along the Mississippi River. In 1784, Virginia relinquished their claim to the region to the Congress of the Confederation. Three years later, Congress passed the Northwest Ordinance, creating the Northwest Territory.

== See also ==
- American Revolutionary War § Stalemate in the North. Places "Siege of Fort Vincennes" in overall sequence and strategic context.
