= George Rogers Clark (disambiguation) =

George Rogers Clark (1752–1818) was an American military officer on the northwestern frontier during the American Revolutionary War.

George Rogers Clark may also refer to:

- Bust of George Rogers Clark, a 1985 bust by David McLary
- George Rogers Clark Monument, a 1921 bronze by Robert Aitken in Charlottesville, Virginia
- George Rogers Clark National Historical Park
- George Rogers Clark Memorial Bridge
- George Rogers Clark Flag
- George Rogers Clark Homesite
- George Rogers Clark High School (Kentucky)
- George Rogers Clark Jr./Sr. High School (Hammond, IN)

== See also ==
- George Rogers Clark Floyd (1810–1895), West Virginia politician and businessman
