= Francis Vigo =

Italian-born soldier in American Revolutionary War

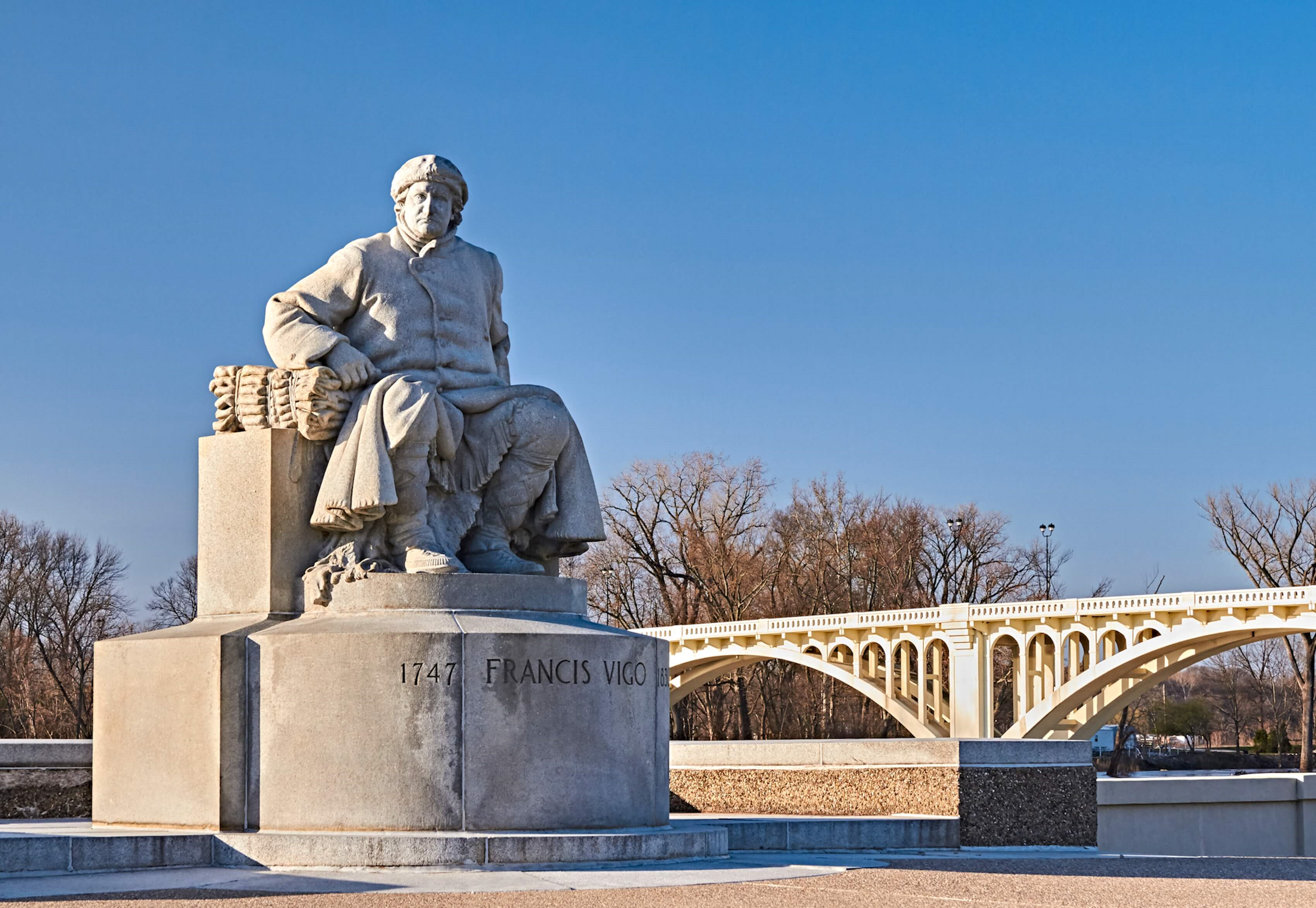
- Statue by John Angel dedicated to Francis Vigo on the waterfront of George Rogers Clark National Historical Park
- Born: Giuseppe Maria Francesco Vigo; December 13, 1747; Mondovì, Piedmont, Kingdom of Sardinia (present-day Italy)
- Died: March 22, 1836 (aged 88–89); Vincennes, Indiana, US
- Burial place: Greenlawn Cemetery, Vincennes, Indiana, Knox County
- Military career
- Allegiance: Spain; United States

Francis Vigo, (Note: As an Italian surname, perhaps from Galician origin in Vigo, Vigo's name is pronounced "VEE-goh" in his native Italian. However, many people pronounce it (in referring to the many streets, buildings, schools, towns, townships, or cities named after him) as “VIH-go.”) born Giuseppe Maria Francesco Vigo (December 13, 1747 – March 22, 1836), was an Italian soldier in the Spanish army and later a fur trader who aided colonial forces during the American Revolutionary War and helped found a public university in Vincennes, Indiana.

== Early life ==
Born in Mondovì, Italy, he served with the Spanish Army in New Orleans. In 1772 he established a fur trading business in St. Louis in partnership with Fernando de Leyba, the governor of Spanish Louisiana. In 1783, Vigo moved to Vincennes and operated a fur trading business there.

== American Revolution ==
Vigo offered to serve George Rogers Clark as a spy during the American Revolutionary War. He was sent to Vincennes to learn of the conditions at the now British-held Fort Sackville. On the way, Vigo was captured by indigenous warriors and turned over to Lt-Gov Henry Hamilton. Although Vigo was a Spanish citizen and hostile acts would breach Spanish neutrality, Hamilton suspected his intentions and paroled him on condition of reporting to the fort each day. This actually assisted Vigo's observations, allowing him to assess the fort's strength and defences.

Some time later, despite their love for Hamilton, the Canadiens were persuaded by Father Gibault to demand Vigo's release, on threat of cutting off local supplies to the fort. Hamilton offered that release provided Vigo agreed "not to do any act during the war injurious to the British interests." Vigo accepted on the basis that the terms would apply only during his return to St. Louis. Vigo travelled down the Wabash, Ohio, and Mississippi Rivers to St. Louis. Having fulfilled the agreement precisely, Vigo then turned around and went directly to Kaskaskia to tell Clark of preparedness at the British fort. Clark took advantage of the information to capture the fort in 1779.

A contemporary of Vigo said that he further aided the American capture of the Northwest Territory by lending his financial backing to the United States dollar. The Canadiens refused payments in "continental paper" until Vigo guaranteed them. However, the value of the dollar would soon collapse. Vigo reportedly complained that he was never compensated by the US government for supporting American credit during the war.

== Post-war years ==
In the 1790s Vigo traded with American merchants on the East Coast of the U.S.

In 1801, Vigo petitioned the U.S. Congress for a donation of land to establish the Jefferson Academy in Vincennes. In 1806, Vigo was named one of the original trustees of the now renamed Vincennes University.

From 1790 to 1810 he was a colonel in the Knox County Militia before resigning, citing age and infirmity.

In 1818 Vigo County, Indiana, was established and named for him.

Vigo was featured in a collectors coin to celebrate the bicentennial of Indiana statehood.

== Death ==
Vigo died March 22, 1836, while living in the home of Jean Baptiste and Elizabeth (Martin) LaPlante, in Vincennes. It was not until 1875, that his estate was allowed payment for $8,016.00, the amount he had used to fund Clark's aborted campaign to take Fort Detroit. This was the only expense the government would officially recognize, but it came with $41,282.60 in interest. As Vigo had no blood-related descendants, however, the government only had to pay for the expenses requested in Vigo's will (which included a bell for the courthouse in Vigo County).

== Legacy ==
Vigo County, Indiana, on the Wabash River north of Vincennes, is named for Francis Vigo, as is Vigo, Indiana. The George Rogers Clark National Historical Park erected a statue of Vigo by John Angel in 1934, on the waterfront of the Wabash River. Vigo was featured in a collectors coin to celebrate the bicentennial of Indiana statehood.

== Notes and references ==
=== Further reading ===
- Commager, Henry Steele and Richard B. Morris. The Spirit of Seventy-Six. The story of the American Revolution as told by its participants. Castle Books. HarperCollins Publishers. ©1958. LCCN 67-11325 ISBN 0-7858-1463-9.
- Law, John. The Colonial History of Vincennes Harvy, Mason & Co. 1858. ISBN 1-55613-199-2
- Somes, Joseph Henry VandeBurgh. Old Vincennes Graphic Books, New York. 1962. LCCN 62-18417.
