= George Rogers Clark National Historical Park =

US National Historical Park in Indiana

- U.S. National Register of Historic Places
- U.S. Historic district
- U.S. National Historical Park
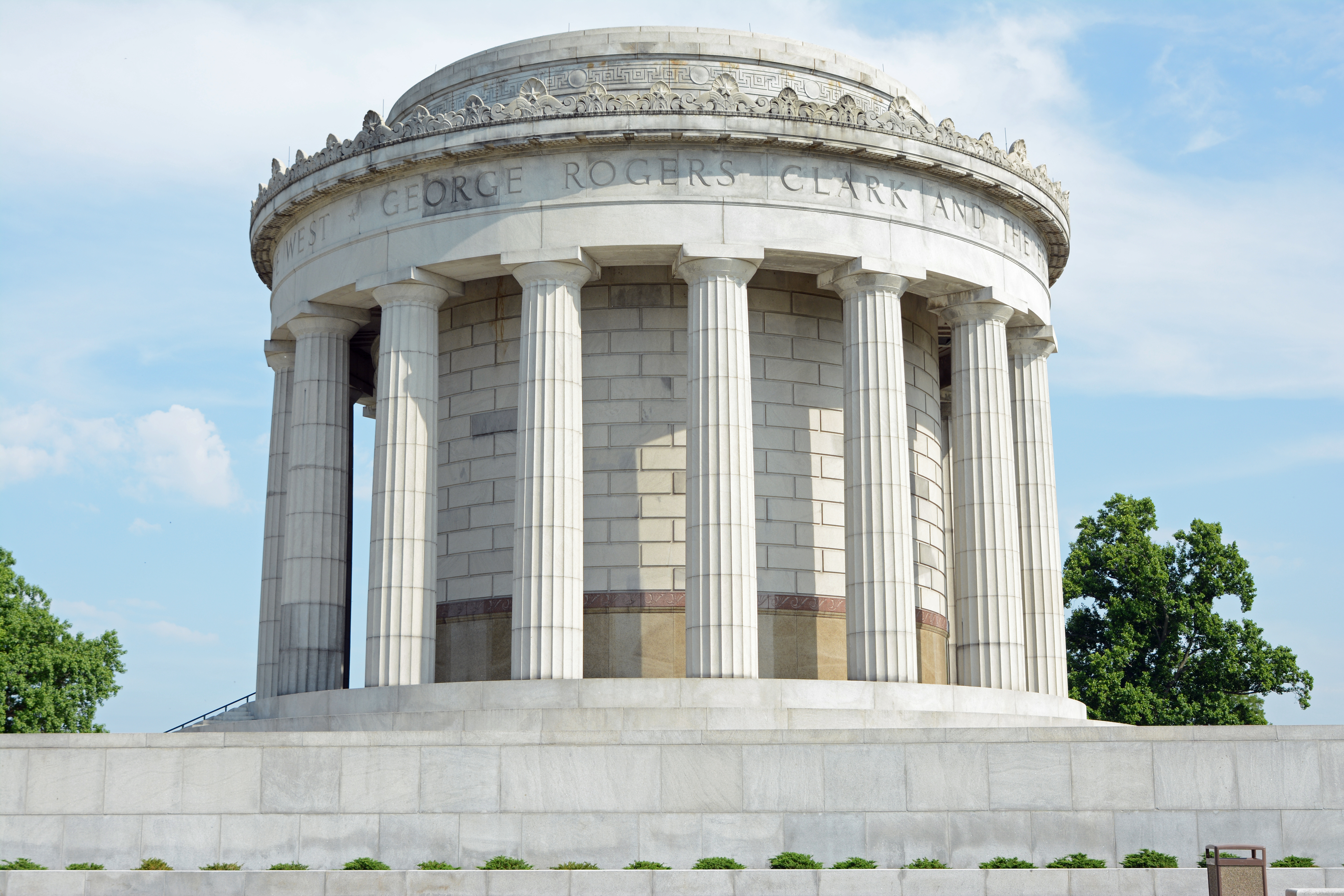
- The George Rogers Clark Memorial

- Location within Indiana Location within the United States
- Location: 2nd St, S of U.S. 50, Vincennes, Indiana, United States
- Coordinates: 38°40′45.1″N 87°32′8.14″W
- Area: 24.3 acres (9.8 ha)
- Built: 1931
- Visitation: 113,397 (2025)
- Website: George Rogers Clark National Historical Park
- NRHP reference No.: 66000007

Significant dates
- Added to NRHP: October 15, 1966
- Designated NHP: July 23, 1966

George Rogers Clark National Historical Park, located in Vincennes, Indiana, on the banks of the Wabash River at what is believed to be the site of Fort Sackville, is a United States National Historical Park. President Calvin Coolidge authorized a classical memorial and President Franklin D. Roosevelt dedicated the completed structure in 1936.

On February 25, 1779, Lieutenant Colonel George Rogers Clark, older brother of William Clark, led the capture of Fort Sackville and British Lt. Governor Henry Hamilton as part of the Illinois Campaign, which lasted from 1778 to 1779. The march of Clark's men from Kaskaskia on the Mississippi River in mid-winter and the subsequent victory over the British remains one of the most memorable feats of the American Revolution.

In 1966, Indiana transferred the site to the National Park Service. Adjacent to the memorial is a visitor center which presents interpretive programs and displays. The center is situated on South 2nd Street in Vincennes. The site is located in the Vincennes Historic District.

== History ==
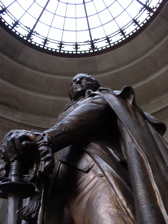
Bronze statue of George Rogers Clark by Hermon Atkins MacNeil under the saucer dome

The memorial is placed at the believed site of Fort Sackville; no archeological evidence has shown the exact location, but it is undoubtedly within the park's boundaries. The episode being commemorated marked the finest moment in General George Rogers Clark's career. He was sent by the state of Virginia to protect its interest in the Old Northwest. His 1778–1779 campaign included the founding of Louisville, Kentucky and the capture of British forts in the lower Ohio and Mississippi valleys. Forces under Clark's command had captured Fort Sackville months before, but when notified that British forces under Henry Hamilton had retaken the fort, Clark led a desperate march to retake the fort again for the American cause, succeeding on February 25, 1779. This led to the newly formed United States claiming control of what would become the states of Ohio, Illinois, Indiana, Michigan, and Wisconsin in the 1783 Treaty of Paris.

As Vincennes grew in the 1800s, it overran the site of Fort Sackville and its boundaries were lost. In 1905, the Daughters of the American Revolution placed a stone marker on what they believed was the location of the fort. In 1929, local residents made a major effort to commemorate the 150th anniversary of Clark's campaign. The state of Indiana chose to build a memorial to General Clark's triumph in the 1930s, with the assistance of the United States government; the various funds amounted to $2.5 million. The memorial was designed by New York architect Frederic Charles Hirons and dedicated June 14, 1936, by President Franklin Roosevelt. Though the National Park Service in 1976 called the finished memorial the "last major Classical style memorial" constructed in the United States, the New York State Memorial to Theodore Roosevelt at the American Museum of Natural History by John Russell Pope was also completed in 1936, and Pope's Jefferson Memorial in Washington, D.C. was completed 1939–1943, are of the same era.

== Structures ==
The memorial building is a circular granite structure surrounded by sixteen granite fluted Greek Doric columns in a peripteral colonnade, capped with a saucer dome of glass panels and resting on a stylobate. The north and east corners have restrooms and various maintenance rooms. Except for the maintenance rooms, these feature plastered walls and ceilings, marble wainscoting, and terrazzo flooring. Visitors enter the memorial by climbing thirty granite steps in the northwest corner. The basement is unfinished, with fluorescent lighting revealing a ceiling and walls of exposed concrete, and a dirt floor.

Other prominent features in the park include John Angel's granite statue of Francis Vigo, a 4-by-9-foot (1.2 by 2.7 m) monument overlooking the Wabash River erected in 1934 that honors the Italian-American merchant who assisted General Clark. The adjacent grounds of the Basilica of St. Francis Xavier hold a 1934 bronze statue by Albin Polasek honoring Father Pierre Gibault, another figure in the Revolutionary War. Raoul Josset designed the Lincoln Memorial Bridge across the Wabash River to complement the memorial aesthetically. It includes relief carvings designed by a monument by Nellie Walker on the Illinois side of the bridge and celebrates the migration of Abraham Lincoln. A concrete floodwall that protects the memorial and Vincennes from Wabash flooding is also designed in a complementary Classical style. The grounds also hold a memorial to the soldiers from Knox County who served in World War I, a marker denoting where Clark's headquarters probably stood during his siege of Fort Sackville, and the original Daughters of the American Revolution memorial, which has moved several times due to construction of the main memorial. Sculptor Joseph Kiselewski created a limestone bas relief for what is now the George Rogers Clark National Historical Park in Vincennes, Indiana in 1930 to 1934. It depicts a young George Rogers Clark receiving his orders to attack the British outposts on the Western frontier from Patrick Henry, according to the National Park Service.

== Murals ==
Muralist Ezra Winter executed a series of seven murals for the building.

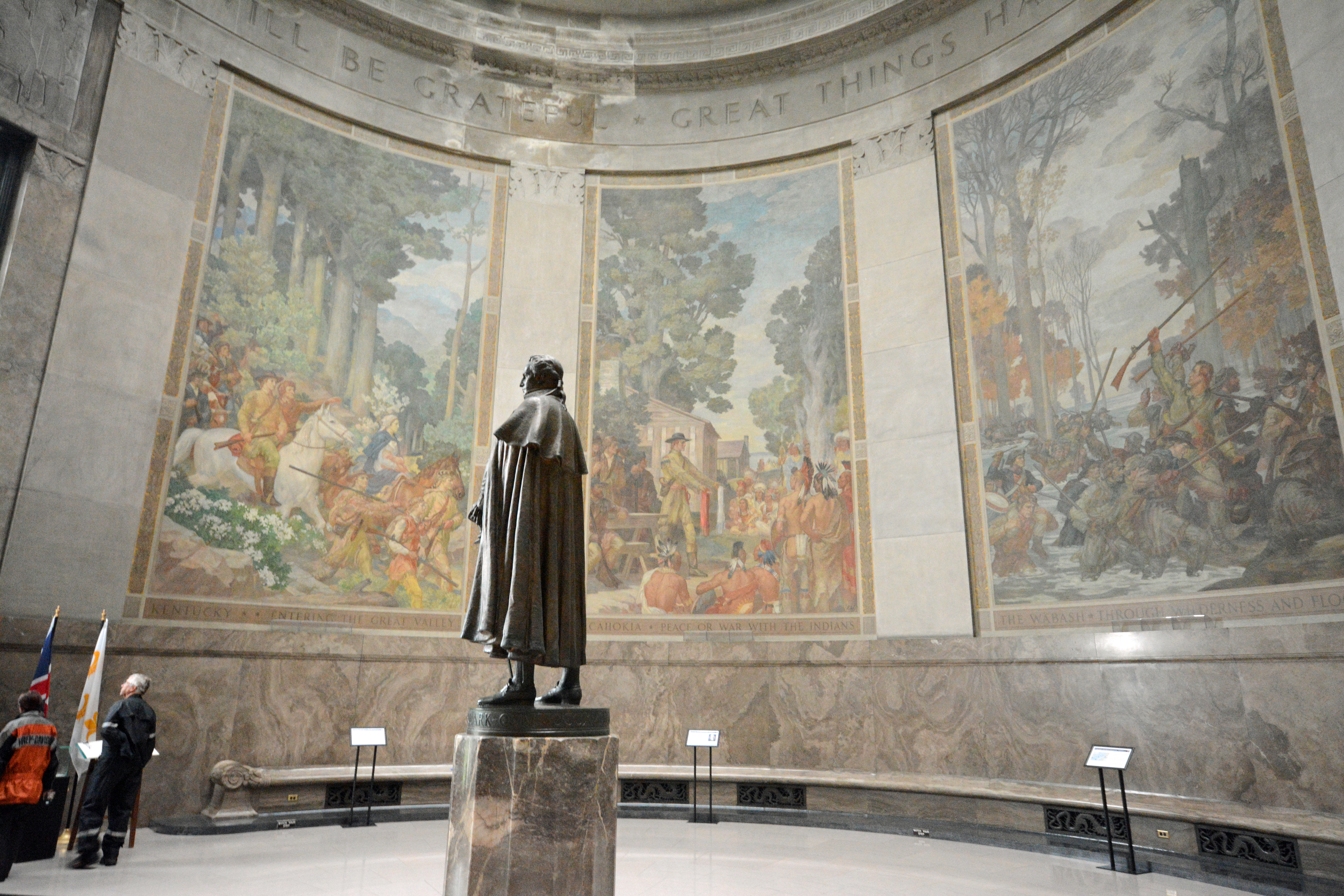
Murals to the left

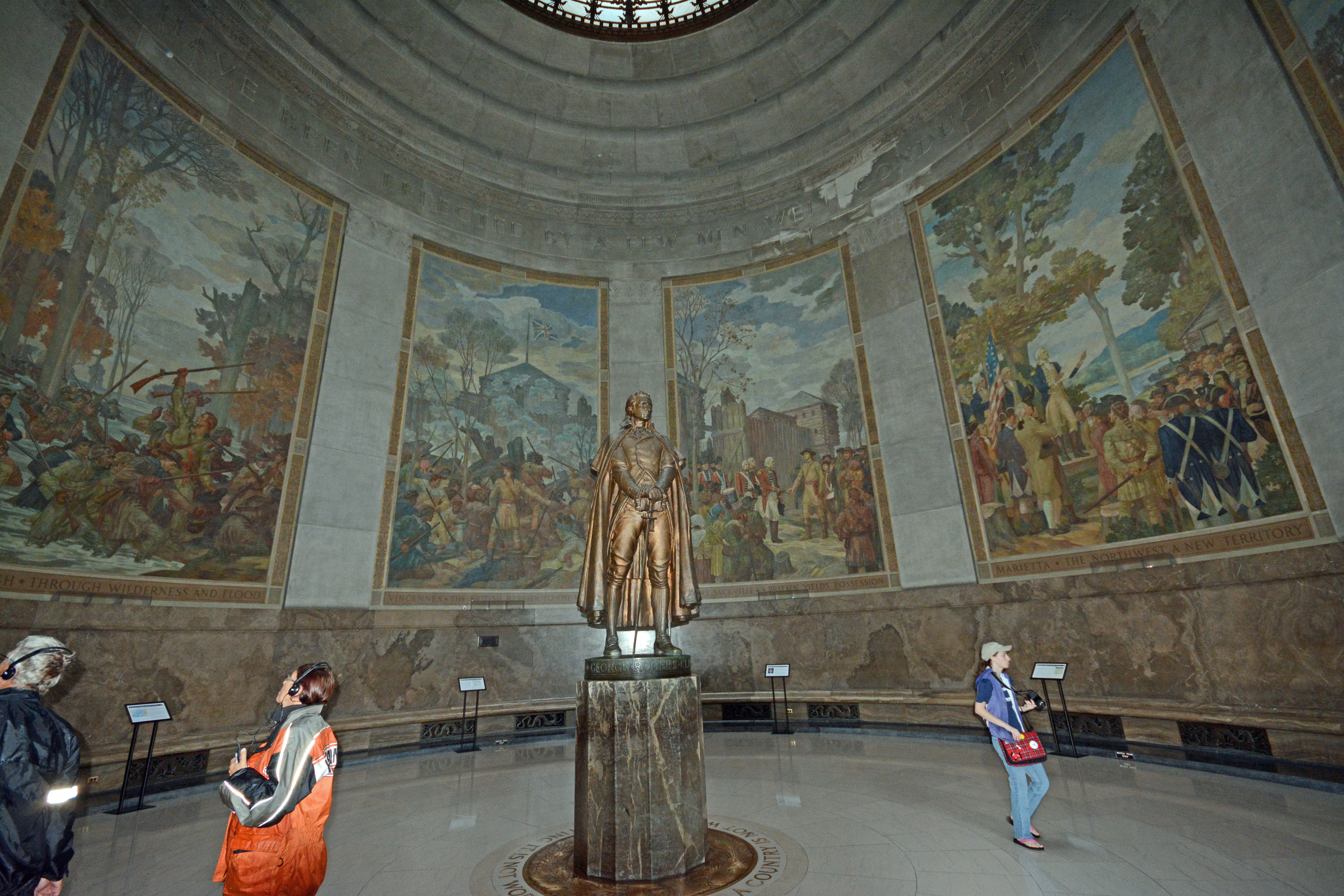
Statue and murals in the center

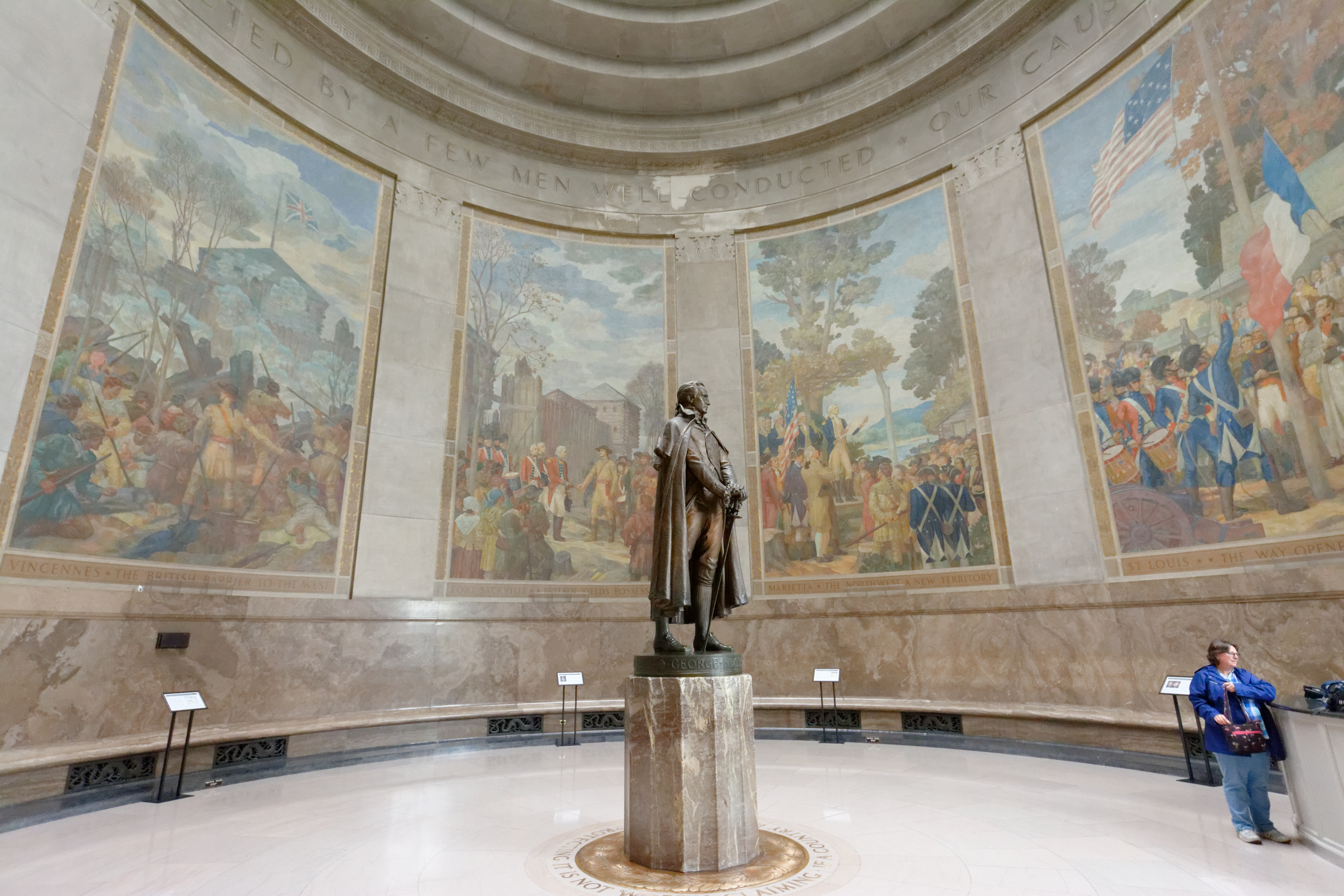
Murals to the right

== Purpose and significance ==
The park was authorized by the Act of July 23, 1966 (PL 89-517). This law (Appendix A) contains three provisions. The first authorized the Secretary of the Interior to accept from the State of Indiana, the donation of the Clark Memorial and surrounding grounds for a national park. This was accomplished within one year of the law's enactment. The second provision permits the Secretary to enter into cooperative agreements with the owners of other historic properties in Vincennes which are associated with George Rogers Clark and the Northwest Territory. Such properties would become part of the park, and the Secretary could assist in their preservation, renewal and interpretation. The third provision requires the Secretary to administer, protect, develop and maintain the park in accordance with the provisions of the act of August 25, 1916, which established the National Park Service.

George Rogers Clark NHP was established to commemorate the accomplishments of George Rogers Clark and the expansion of the United States into the Northwest Territory; to commemorate this story and its significance to the American people; and to cooperate in the preservation, renewal and interpretation of the sites and structures in Vincennes associated with this story. The park also commemorates the actions of Father Pierre Gibault and Francis Vigo who sided with Clark against the British.

The park is located on the site of Fort Sackville which Clark captured from the British during the American Revolution on February 25, 1779. The victory extended American land claims in the Ohio Valley and contributed to the United States acquisition of the Northwest Territory in the 1783 Treaty of Paris. No structures dating from the Revolution exist in the park today.

The historical theme represented by George Rogers Clark NHP is the "Revolution, War in the Frontier," according to 1987 History and Prehistory in the National Park System and the National Historic Landmarks Program.

== Restoration ==
August 9, 2008, George Rogers Clark National Historical Park closed for 13 months to complete a three-million-dollar renovation by Frontier Waterproofing, Inc out of Denton, Texas. Park Superintendent Dale Phillips said, "This is a once-in-a-lifetime restoration project, and is critically needed for the long-term preservation of the Clark Memorial". The main goal was to fix the drainage of the terrace, which has leaked since the 1930s, and renovate the access steps. The monument reopened September 24, 2009, and was rededicated on October 3, 2009. The 2009 Spirit of Vincennes Rendezvous was not impacted by the renovation.

Work during the renovation included demolition and installation of new parapets and rustications; repair of wall cracks; removal, temporary storage, and numbering of approximately 1,000 large granite paving stones; installation of new waterproofing on the existing concrete structural deck of the plaza and the monuments stylobate; cleaning and repair of the granite stone, steps, and veneer; installation of a new exposed aggregate concrete walking surface around the Monument plaza; and replacing the existing sprinkler system and landscaping elements. This repaired problems first identified in a 1939 structural inspection.

George Rogers Clark National Historical Park was honored on an America the Beautiful Quarter representing Indiana in 2017.

== Gallery ==
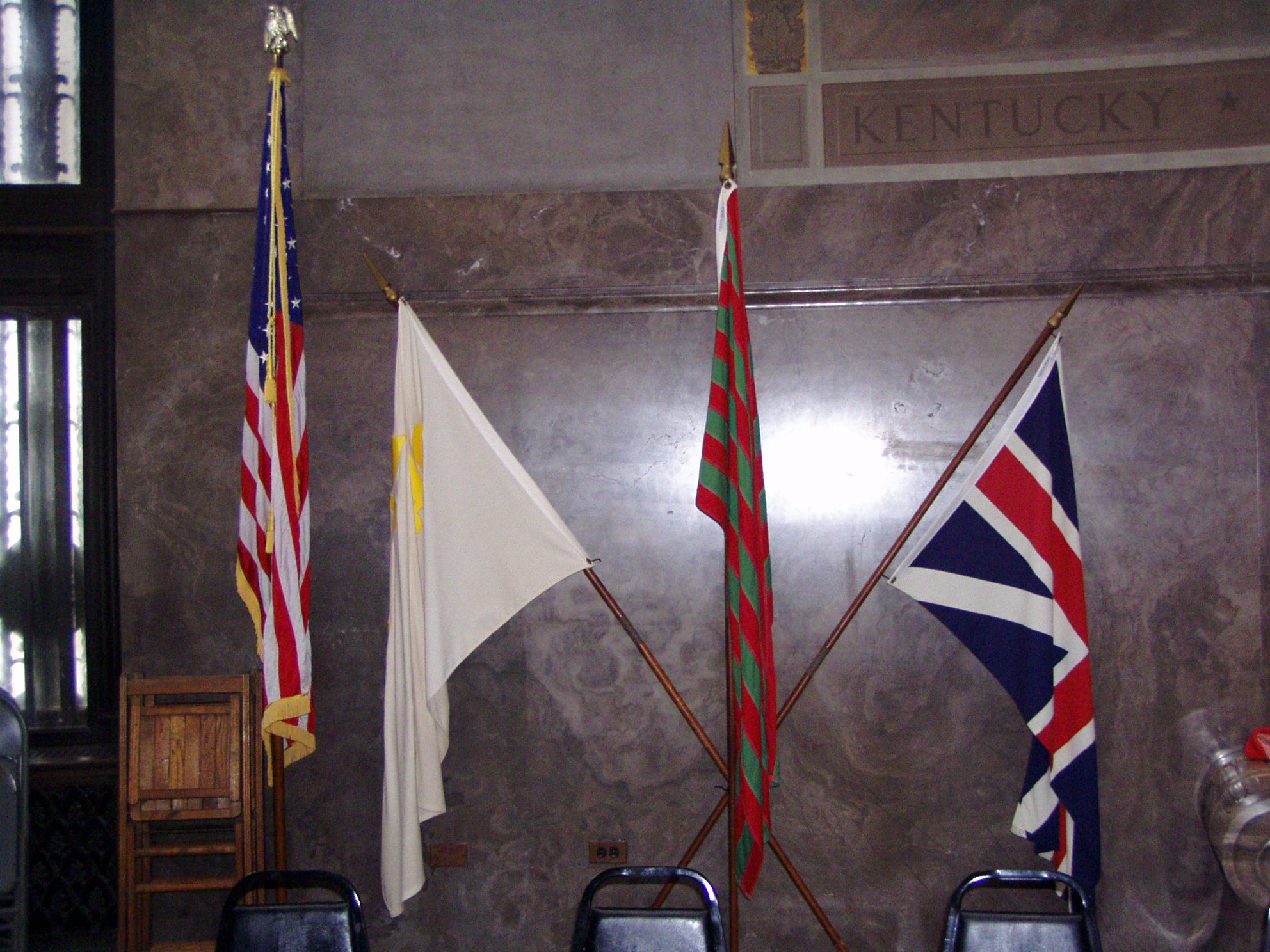
Flag display in the monument

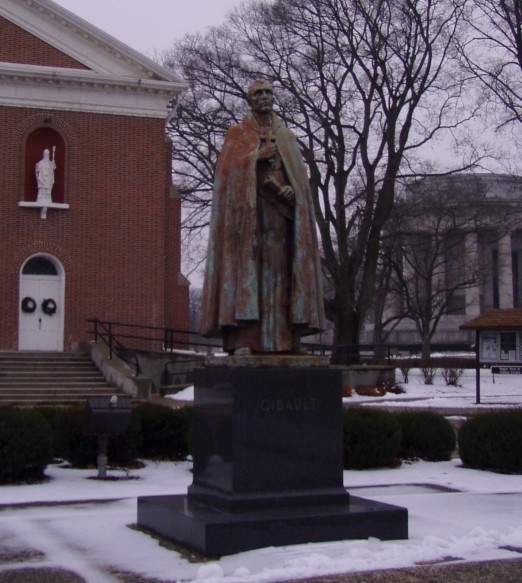
Statue of Father Pierre Gibault

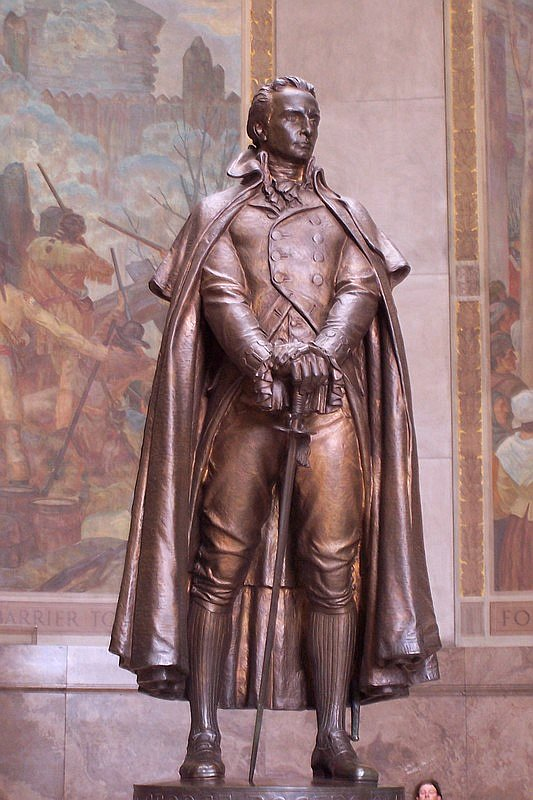
McNeil's Clark

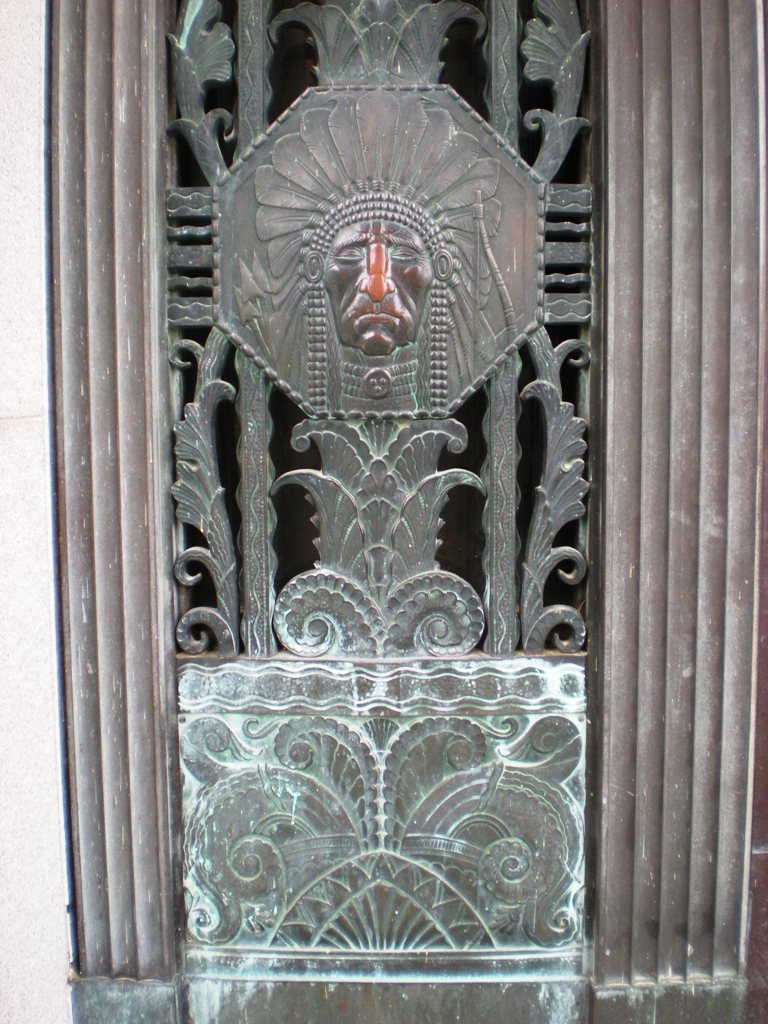
Bronze doors with Native American detail

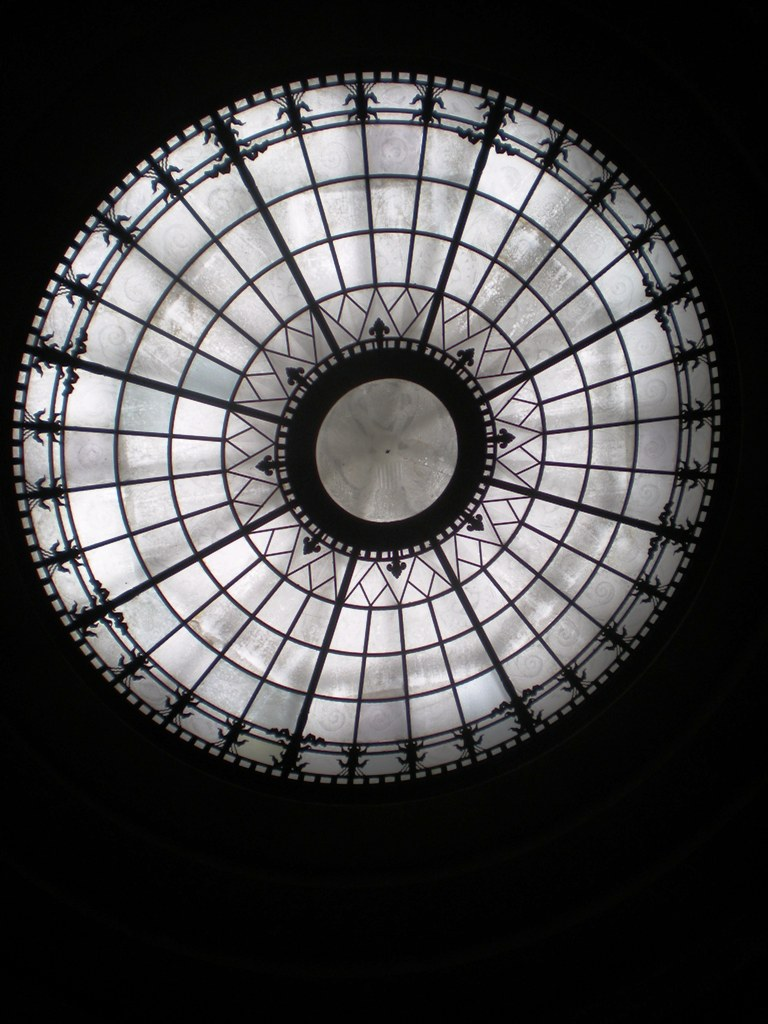
The rotunda ceiling

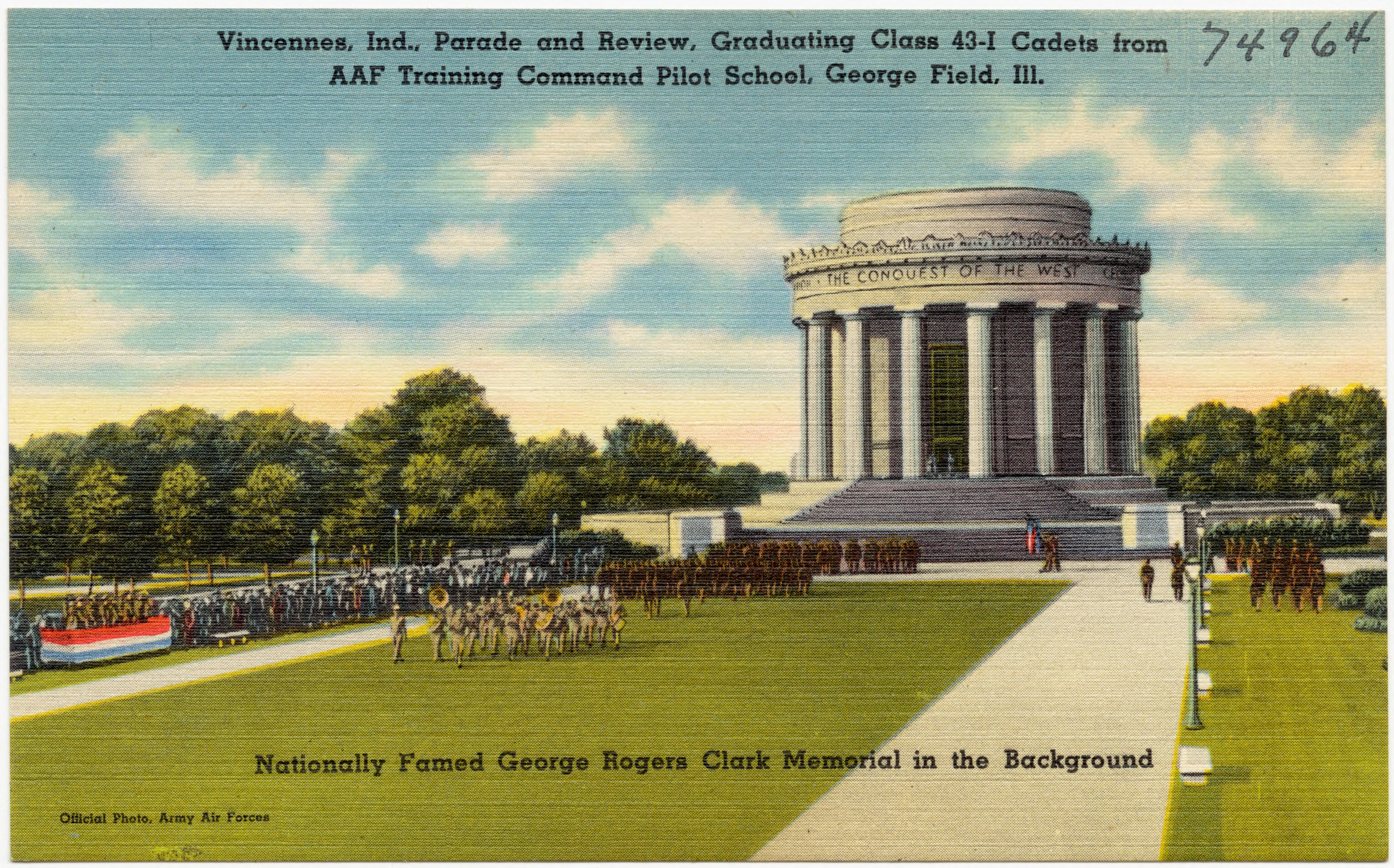
Postcard showing the memorial and a graduating class from the Army Air Field at George Field

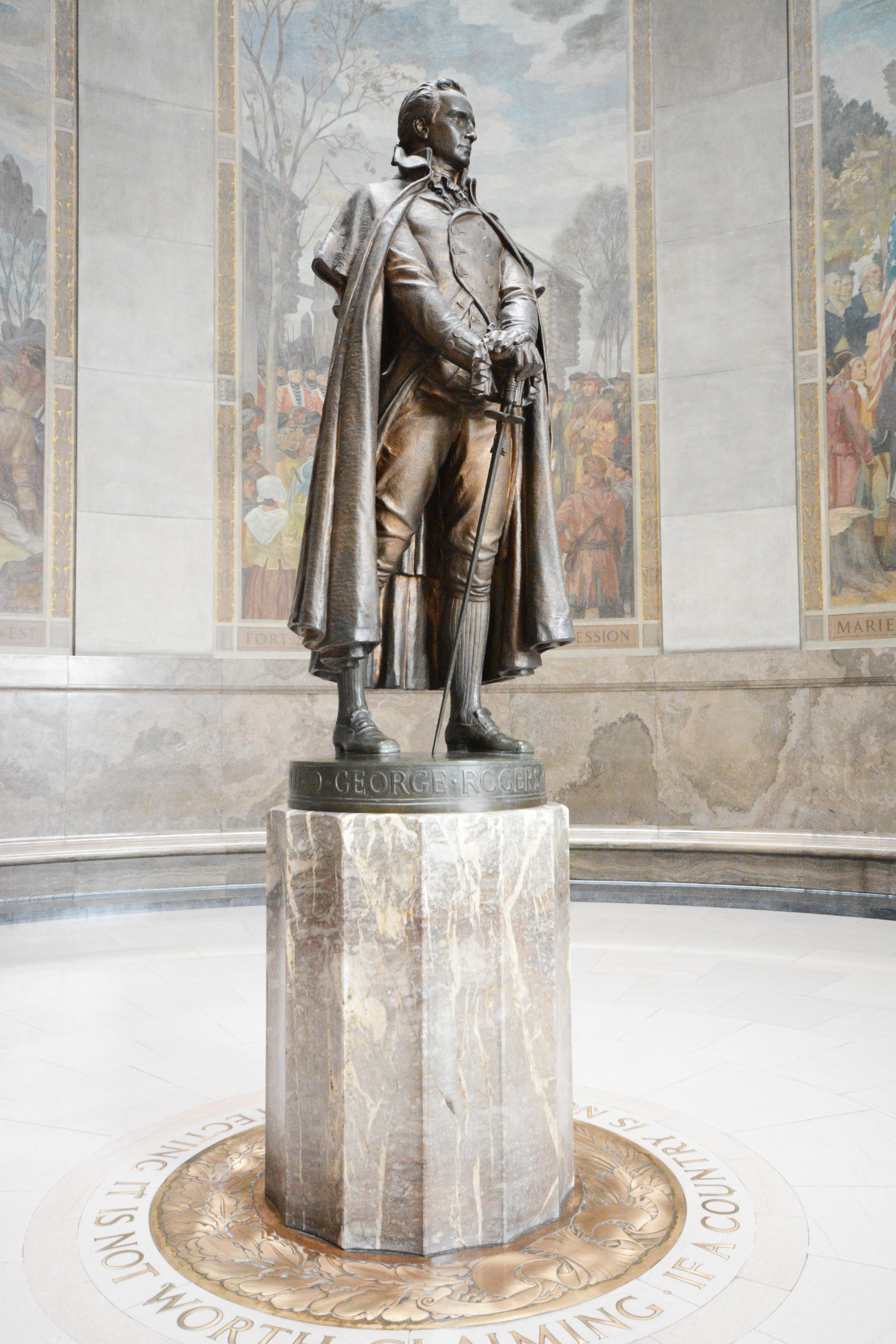
Statue of Clark

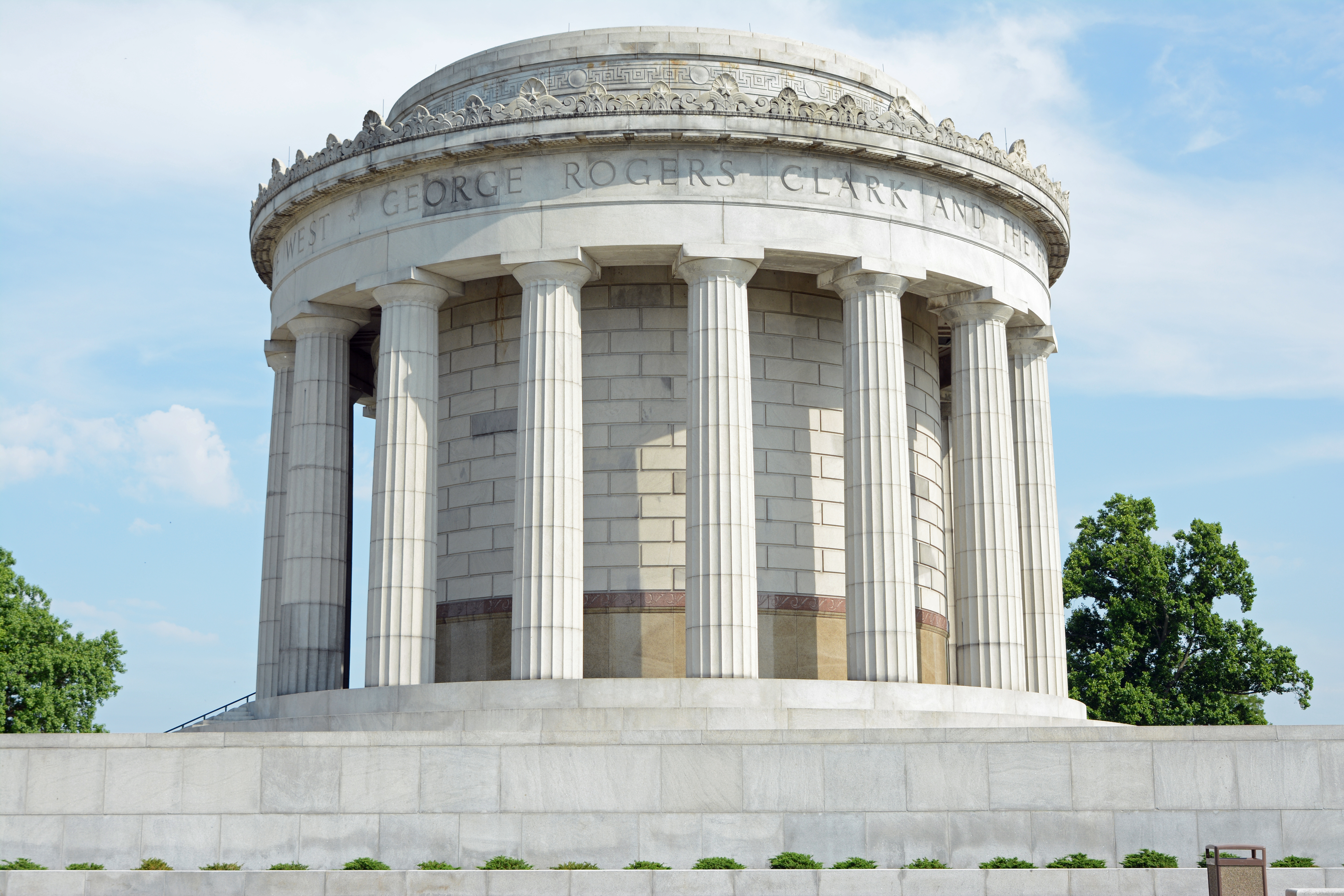
Outside of the building

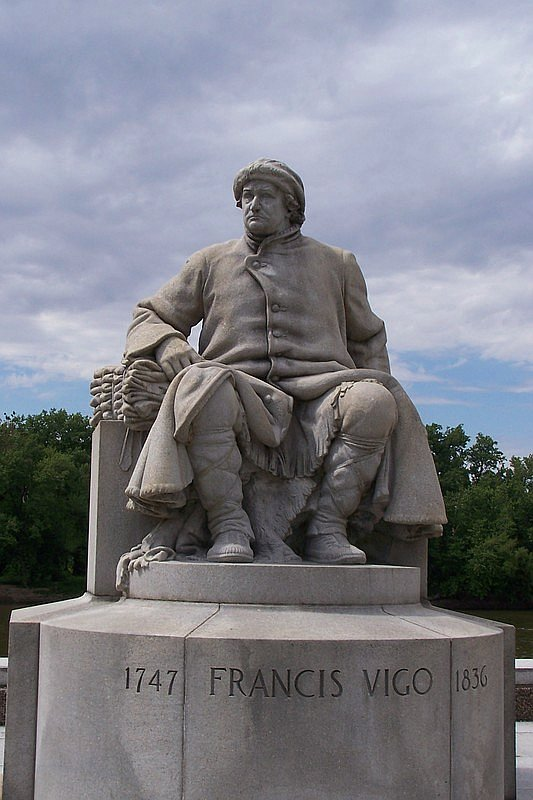
Francis Vigo statue by John Angel

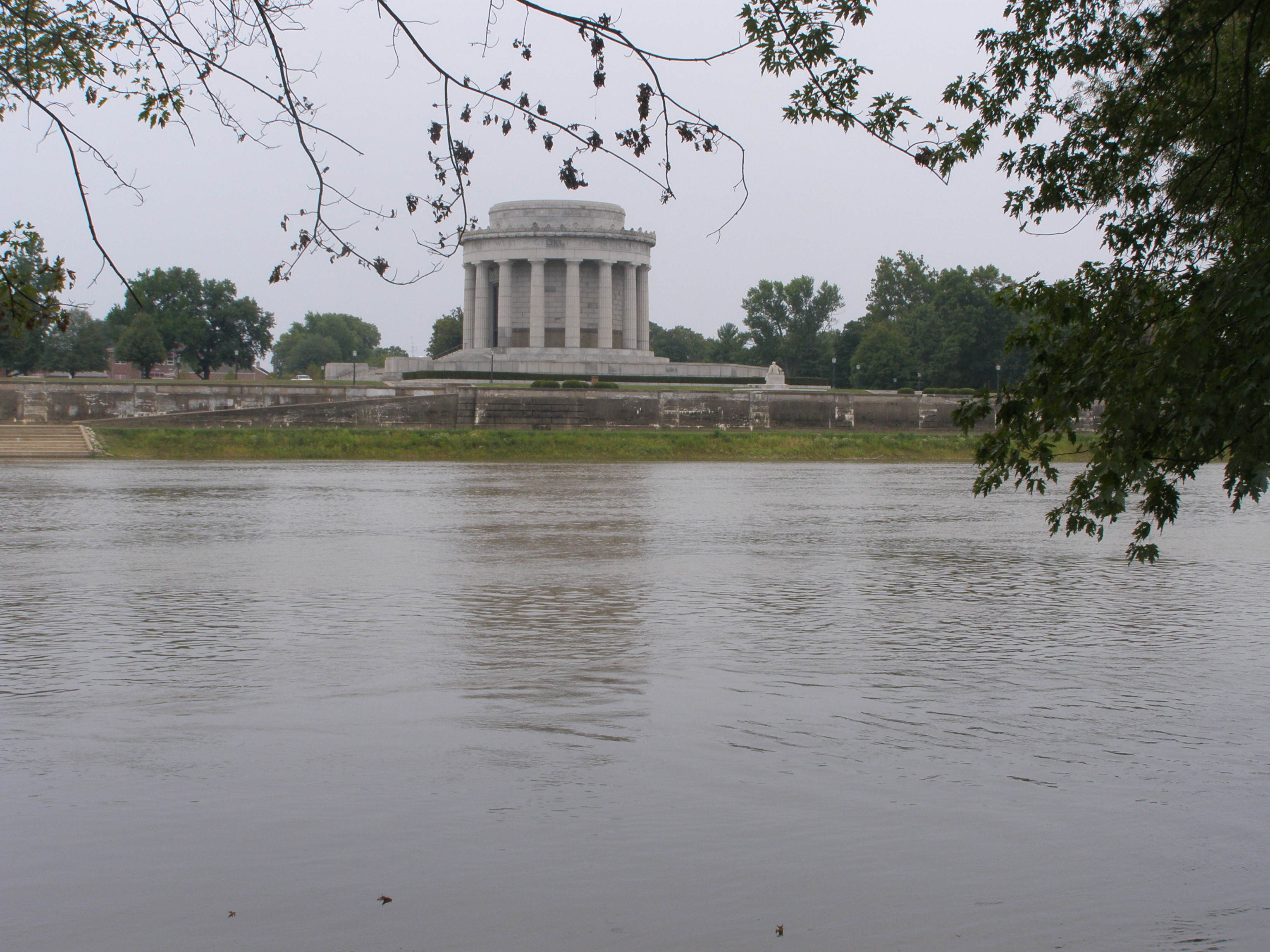
George Rogers Clark Memorial Rotunda from across the Wabash River (Illinois view), Vincennes, Indiana
