= Normand MacLeod =

Normand MacLeod (c. 1731 – 1796) was a British Army officer, merchant, and official of the British Indian Department.

He was born on the Isle of Skye, in Scotland, about 1731. At age sixteen he joined the Forty Second Highlanders (Black Watch) Regiment, and went with his unit to the Netherlands and what is now Belgium. By 1756 he was an ensign as the regiment went to New York to fight in the French and Indian War. In 1760 MacLeod won promotion to captain lieutenant and transferred to the Eighteenth Regiment. In 1761 MacLeod attended the Niagara Conference held between Sir William Johnson and Pontiac. MacLeod heard a rumor that Pontiac was being paid ten shillings a day by the British and this was creating resentment among other Indians which would "end in his ruin." Soon after this MacLeod and 120 men delivered food and supplies to Detroit, and when he returned he assumed command of the British fort at Fort Oswego, New York, on Lake Ontario, where his title was "Commissary of Indian Affairs". He continued working as an agent between Johnson and the Michigan Indians for several years. MacLeod sent Johnson a bottle of oil from a lake which the Indians thought had curative powers; he negotiated a peace between the Seneca and Mississauga tribes.

When the French and Indian War ended the army put MacLeod on half-pay. He married Cecile Robert. MacLeod also joined the Masons.

In 1774 he moved to Detroit, where he set up a general store with nineteen investors. Three years later he was "town major," a military form of mayor. In 1778 he accompanied Henry Hamilton on the attack of Vincennes, Indiana, but went back to Detroit before Vincennes was captured by George Rogers Clark in February 1779. By 1782 MacLeod was still in Detroit and was father to one child. He bought an interest in a fur trading company with John Gregory and called their company Gregory, MacLeod, and Co. They later invited Sir Alexander Mackenzie to buy a share in the company; by 1785 Peter Pangman and John Ross became partners as well, and Alexander's cousin, Roderick Mackenzie, served as an apprentice clerk. MacLeod worked in the company several years before moving to Montreal, where he died in 1796.
