= Pierre Gibault =

Jesuit missionary

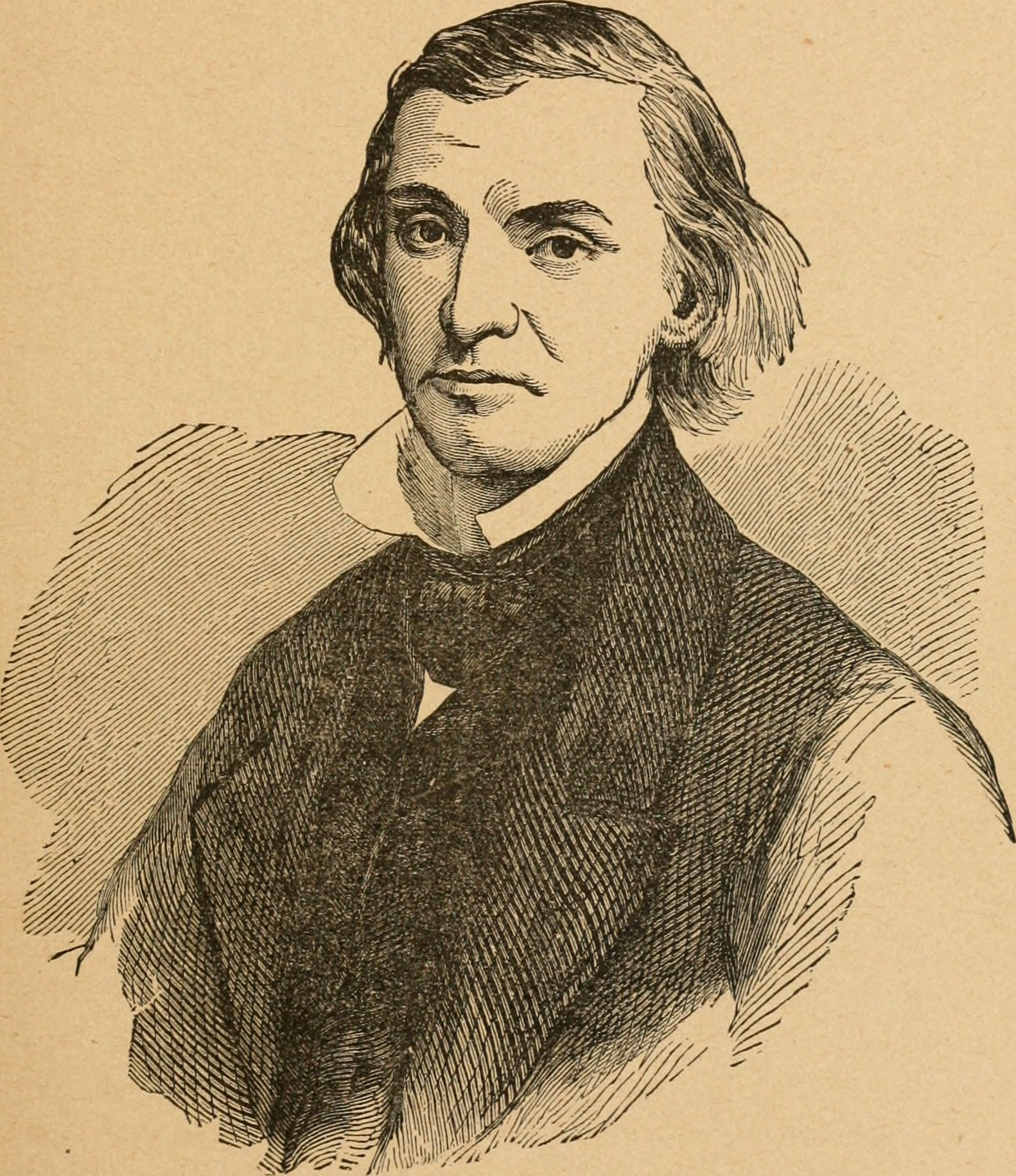
Pierre Gebault

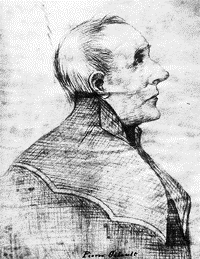

Pierre Gibault (7 April 1737 – 16 August 1802) was a Jesuit missionary and priest in the Northwest Territory in the 18th century, and an American Patriot during the American Revolution.

== Frontier Missionary ==
Gibault was born 7 April 1737 at Montreal, the son of Pierre Gibault and Marie Saint-Jean, and was baptised the same day. He was educated as a missionary and ordained as priest at Quebec on 19 March 1768, and was quickly appointed Vicar General of the Archbishop of Quebec for the Illinois country.

When France lost the Northwest Territory to Great Britain in 1763, Jesuit priests were expelled. Catholic communities had to rely on local laity to lead their congregations. In July, Gibault arrived at Michilimackinac, where he spent a week attending to the religious needs of the Catholics, some of whom had not seen a priest for many years. Gibault arrived in Kaskaskia on 8 September 1768, where he served Catholics of French and Indian ethnicity, as well as Irish Catholic soldiers in the British Army's 18th Regiment of Foot who were stationed there. He first arrived in Vincennes in 1769, where a crowd greeted him with cries of "Save us, Father; we are nearly in Hell!"

Gibault oversaw a circuit of parishes, including Vincennes, Kaskaskia, Ste Genevieve, and Cahokia. He also visited settlements as far as Ouiatenon, Peoria, and St. Joseph. The territory was still considered dangerous frontier, and Gibault carried a gun and two pistols.

In 1770 he blessed the little wooden chapel that had been erected at Paincourt, the present site of St. Louis. Gibault officiated at the chapel regularly in spite of being under the authority of the bishop of Quebec and being a British subject, and he performed dozens of masses and sixty-four baptisms until 1772, when a Capuchin priest named Valentine became the first resident priest.

== The Patriot priest ==
Gibault was in Kaskaskia in 1778 when George Rogers Clark arrived. According to Clark, Gibault stated that he supported the Americans, but was concerned for his Catholic congregation. Clark assured him that by the laws of Virginia, they would be free to worship as they wished. Clark also informed Gibault of the newly signed treaty between the United States and France.

Gibault convinced the Canadian residents under his care to support the Americans. He further convinced the residents to recognize American continental paper money. Gibault often exchanged Spanish milled dollars for an equal amount of continental promissary notes, and by 1783 estimated that this cost him 7,800 livres. Gibault, together with Spanish trader Francis Vigo, is considered to have funded most of the Illinois campaign.

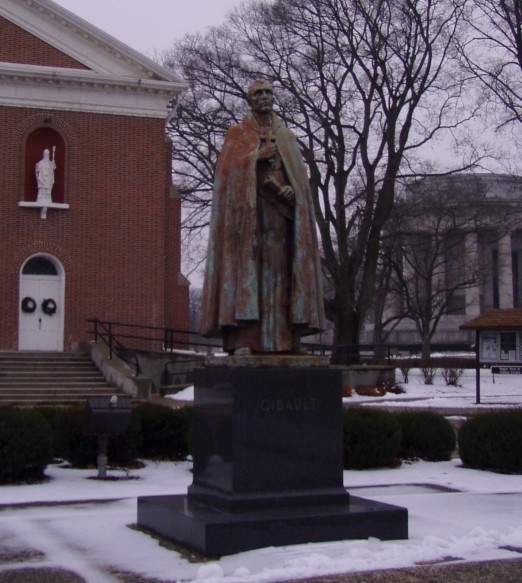
Statue of Gibault, in front of the Old Cathedral and George Rogers Clark National Historical Park, Vincennes, Indiana

Clark told Gibault of his plans to take Vincennes, but Gibault stated that he could do this without troops. Gibault and Jean-Baptiste Laffont (surname variations include LaFond, LaFont) left Kaskaskia on 14 July 1778 and converted an overwhelming majority of Vincennes residents to the American cause. The population raised a new American flag at the abandoned Fort Sackville, wrapping the British flag around a stone and discarding it into the Wabash River. Gibault returned to Kaskaskia and reported the news to Clark.

When Lt-Governor Henry Hamilton retook Fort Sackville and Captain Leonard Helm, Gibault found himself confined to Vincennes. Hamilton then captured Francis Vigo, a Spanish citizen and therefore a non-combatant. Gibault conducted Sunday mass, then led his entire congregation to Fort Sackville, where he informed Hamilton that all supplies would be denied to the garrison until Vigo was released. Vigo was released, and informed Clark of the capture of Vincennes. Gibault soon returned to Kaskaskia, and blessed a force of Canadians and Virginians led by Clark to re-capture Vincennes in February 1779.

For his services to the Americans, Gibault was viewed disfavorably by his fellow clergy, who had remained loyal to the British government. Gibault actually requested a move to Quebec in 1788, but was denied by the Bishop due to a disadvantageous opinion that the government had formed of him.

In a letter from Cahokia dated 1 May 1790, Gibault detailed his services and the debts owed him to Arthur St. Clair. He asked, as a "concession," that the United States would legally grant some land in Kaskaskia- which had traditionally been used by priests- to him and his successors. The request was forwarded on and granted by President George Washington, but the newly appointed American Bishop objected.

Without land or compensation, Gibault moved to New Madrid, Missouri, pastoring the parish of Saint-Isidore until his death on 16 August 1802. Pierre Gibault Catholic Ministry to Arkansas post in 1792-1793 while serving as priest for the parish in New Madrid ( Missouri). Records of the baptisms and marriages he performed for the French and mixed- ancestry families at the post are among the oldest surviving sacramental documents in Arkansas. His body was sent to Canada, but his grave is unmarked.

== Namesakes ==
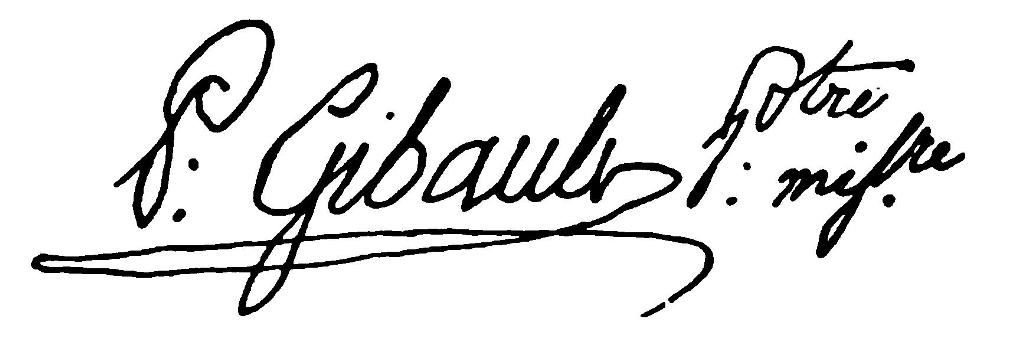
Gibault's signature

- USS Pierre Gibault is named for Gibault.
- Gibault Catholic High School in Waterloo, Illinois is named for Gibault.
- Gibault, Inc., dba Gibault Children's Services, based in Terre Haute, Indiana is also named for Gibault and was founded in 1921 by the Indiana Knights of Columbus.
- Gibault Memorial Tower, part of Good Samaritan Hospital in Vincennes, Indiana, opened in 2015.

Gibault was featured in a collectors' coin to celebrate the bicentennial of Indiana statehood.
