= Leonard Helm =

American frontiersman and military officer

- Born: around 1720; Fauquier County, Virginia
- Died: around June 4, 1782 (aged 62-61); Jefferson County, Virginia (now Kentucky)
- Occupation: Early pioneer of Kentucky
- Known for: Virginia officer during the American Revolutionary War

Leonard Helm was an American frontiersman and military officer who served during the American Revolutionary War. Born around 1720 probably in Fauquier County, Virginia, he died in poverty while fighting Native American allies of British troops during one of the last engagements of the Revolutionary War around June 4, 1782, in Jefferson County, Virginia (now Jefferson County, Kentucky).

== Early life ==
Leonard Helm was born around 1720 in Virginia to Leonard Helm Sr. and his wife Margaret Neil Helm. His father emigrated from England and the family traces their ancestry to Lancaster, England.

== Illinois Campaign ==
Helm was commissioned a captain and asked to raise and lead a company of Virginians by the newly promoted Lieutenant Colonel George Rogers Clark. On January 2, 1778, Governor Patrick Henry, of Virginia, gave George Rogers Clark the authority to raise a regiment and secret orders to attack British forces and their allies on Virginia's frontier. Leonard Helm, who had served with Clark during Dunmore's War and had spent a lot of time in Kentucky, was given command of one of the initial four companies created to form this regiment. Captain Helm recruited soldiers from the Virginia militia from both Prince William and Fauquier Counties. Clark nicther unit was later known as the Illinois Regiment and participated in the Northwest Campaign.

Clark and his men captured Kaskaskia, Illinois, on July 4, 1778, and Cahokia, Illinois July 6, 1778. During the capture of Kaskaskia, Clark split his force, commanding one half himself with Captain Helm commanding the other. A series of relatively peaceful conquests took place, with Helm reaching as far as Fort Ouiatenon.

== Vincennes ==
Vincennes decided to support the Americans at the urging of Father Gibault, and Captain Helm was sent to command Fort Sackville(renamed Fort Patrick Henry), with a group of local French speaking militiamen and 20 soldiers from Virginia. He requested and received support from the local Piankeshaw tribe, especially the chief known as Young Tobacco.

The British retook the fort on 17 December 1778, after Helm's local militia had deserted and he had too few men to attempt resistance. When the British formed within yards of the fort, Captain Helm opened the gate and pointed a cannon at the British formation, with an artillery match in one hand and a bottle of whiskey with the other.

He invited Lieutenant Colonel Hamilton to share whiskey and discuss terms as gentlemen. Knowing that the British did not fully understand his tactical situation, he demanded and received favorable terms of surrender. Lieutenant Colonel Hamilton was later shocked to find only three people within the fort but honored his agreement. When Colonel Clark heard about the surrender several weeks later, he and his force made a bold march through icy winter weather and laid siege to Fort Sackville. Captain Helm was inside Fort Sackville as a prisoner during the siege, and Clark notes in his memoir that he "amused himself very much during the siege, and, I believe, did much damage."

Helm came with the British party to the 24 February negotiations to end the siege, and tried to negotiate Clark's harsh terms of surrender. Clark countered that Helm could not negotiate because he was a British prisoner, at which point Hamilton released Helm. Whether he meant to reinforce his hardline negotiations or reprimand Helm for his impropriety in seemingly negotiating for Hamilton, Clark refused to receive the captain, and informed Helm that he must return to Fort Sackville and "await his fate." Hamilton surrendered 25 February 1779, and Fort Sackville was again renamed Fort Patrick Henry.

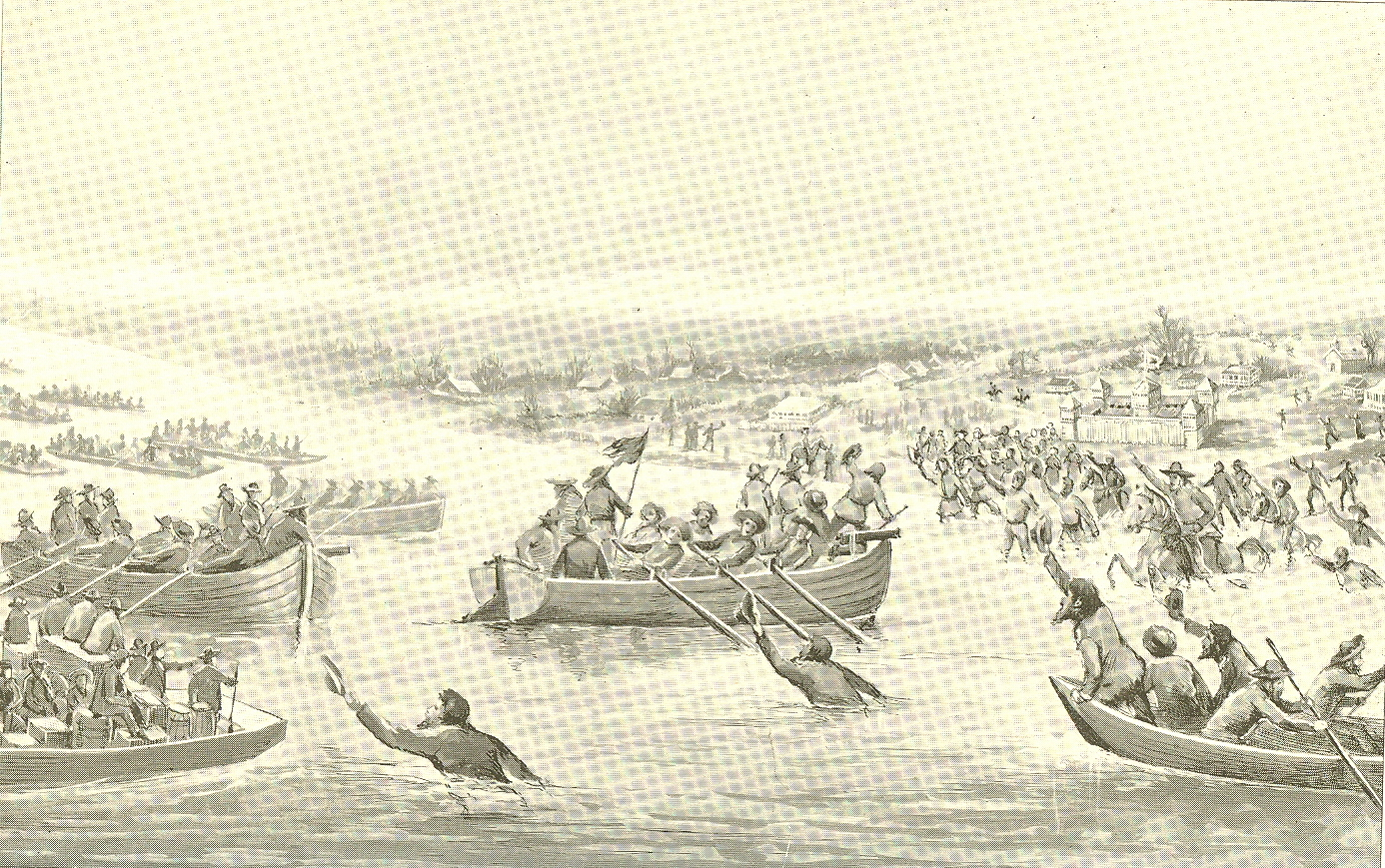
Helm's little flotilla returning to Vincennes after having captured the British boats on the Wabash.

== Wabash Expedition ==
On 5 March 1779, Helm led a small force of 3 boats and 50 men up the Wabash River from Vincennes and captured a fleet of 7 boats, 40 prisoners (among whom, Clark noted in a letter to George Mason, was 'Dejeane, Grand Judge of Detroit'), supplies, and trade goods that were sent to reinforce Hamilton at Fort Sackville. The battle occurred just west of Pointe Coupee, Indiana, and is locally referred to as the westernmost naval battle of the American Revolution, despite the account of the capture in George Rogers Clark's memoir:

March 5th, Captain Helm, Majors Bosseron and Legras, returned from their journey up the river with great success. They came up with the enemy in the night, discerning their fires at a distance; waited until all was quiet; surrounded and took the whole prisoners, without the firing of a gun. Those (British) gentlemen were off their guard, and so little apprehensive of an enemy in that part of the world that they could hardly persuade themselves that what they saw and heard was real. This was a valuable (prize) seven boats loaded with provisions and goods to a considerable amount.

== Battle of the White River Forks ==
When Clark left Vincennes for Kaskaskia on 20 March 1779, he again appointed Captain Helm as commandant of the town, as well as Superintendent of Indian Affairs. While in command, a party of five traders left Vincennes for the Falls of the Ohio, along the ancient Buffalo Trace. A small band of Delaware from a village called Lechauwitank, between the forks of the White River, ambushed the traders, killed them, and plundered their goods. Helm's reaction from Vincennes was strong. Helm called up the Vincennes militia and the garrison under Lt. Brashears, and they attacked the village at night. The entire village was destroyed, the surviving men were tomahawked to death in Vincennes, and the women and children were sold into slavery.

== Fort Nelson and death ==
Clark later appointed Helm as commander of the fort in present-day Louisville, Kentucky. Captain Helm was killed while serving as the commander of this fort. Helm had sold some of his land for continental currency under the belief that the value of it would increase. Instead, the continental dollar became almost worthless and Helm died in poverty, his personal estate consisting only of his clothes. Many years later his heirs received 4,666 acres (19 km^{2}) from Virginia for his service in the Illinois Regiment. Leonard Helm's service during the American Revolution meets the requirements for membership in the Society of the Cincinnati.
