= Forts of Vincennes, Indiana =

Coordinates: 38.7251202°N 87.5062652°W

Fort Vincennes, Fort Sackville, Fort Patrick Henry
- Vincennes, Indiana

Site information
- Type: Fort
- Controlled by: New France; Kingdom of Great Britain; United States

Site history
- Built: 1731-32, 1736
- In use: 1732-1736, 1736-1766, 1778-79
- Materials: wood
- Battles/wars: First Battle of Vincennes;Battle of Vincennes

Garrison information
- Past commanders: Leonard Helm, Henry Hamilton, George Rodgers Clark
- Garrison: 90

- Fort Knox II Site
- U.S. National Register of Historic Places
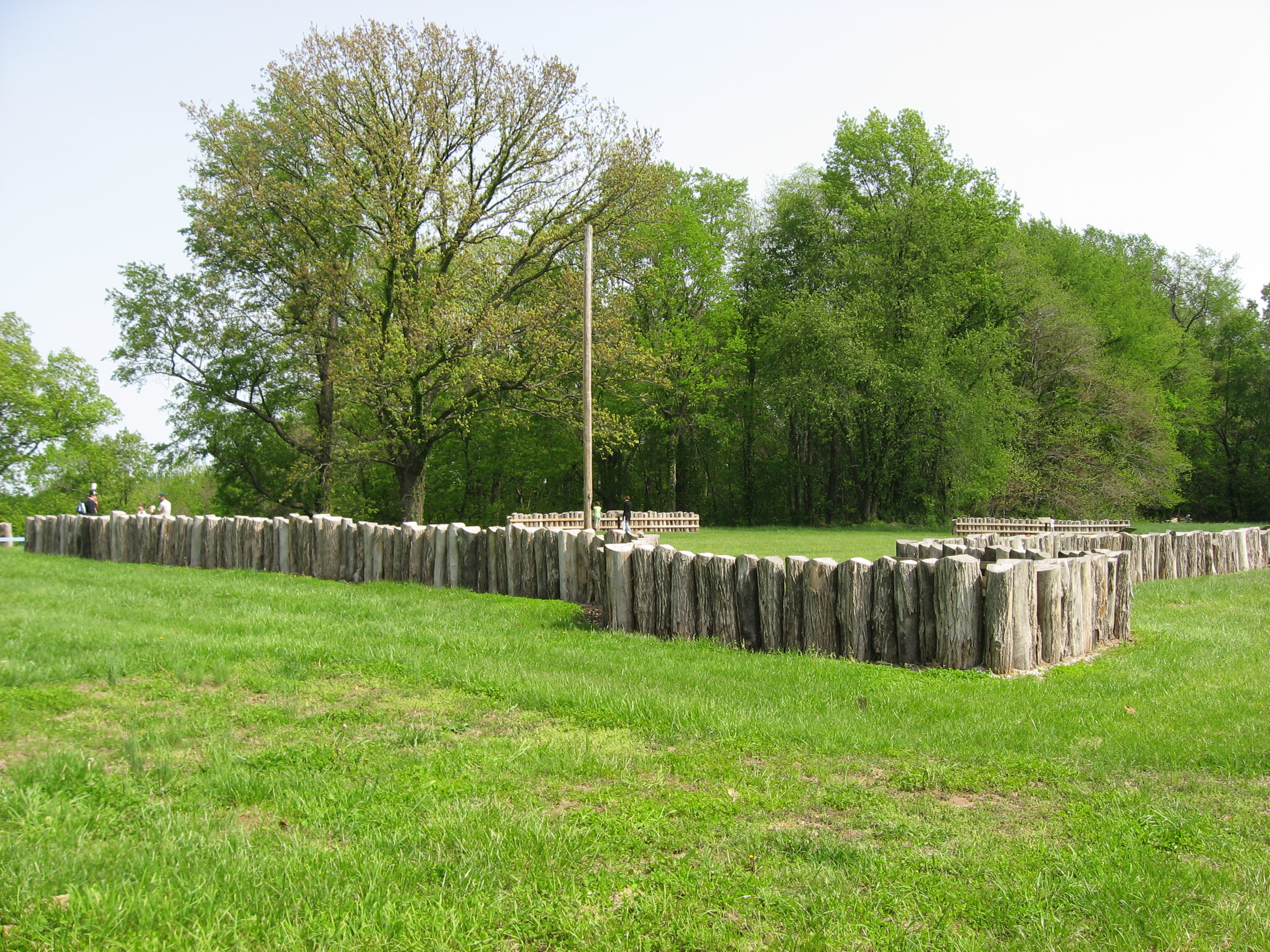
- Reconstructed palisades at the site of Fort Knox II

- Location within Indiana Location within the United States
- Nearest city: Vincennes, Indiana
- Area: 1.8 acres (0.73 ha)
- Built: 1803
- NRHP reference No.: 82000045
- Added to NRHP: March 24, 1982

During the 18th and early 19th centuries, the French, British and U.S. forces built and occupied a number of forts at Vincennes, Indiana. These outposts commanded a strategic position on the Wabash River. The names of the installations were changed by the various ruling parties, and the forts were considered strategic in the French and Indian War, the American Revolutionary War, the Northwest Indian War and the War of 1812. The last fort was abandoned in 1816.

The settlement around the forts was best known as the territorial capital of the Northwest Territory (later, the Indiana Territory). The best known event was Gen. William Henry Harrison's mustering of forces at Vincennes just prior to his campaign against the Indian capital at Prophetstown in Tippecanoe, culminating in the Battle of Tippecanoe in 1811. This battle was one of the factors that contributed to the start of the War of 1812.

The former site of what is known as "Fort Knox II" has been marked and preserved as a state historic site. It is listed on the National Register of Historic Places.

== Trading post ==
The first trading post on the Wabash River was established by Sieur Charles Juchereau, the first Lieutenant-General of the Royal Jurisdiction of the Provostship of Montreal. Sieur Juchereau along with 34 Canadiens, founded the company post on October 28, 1702, for the purpose of trading for buffalo hides to be supplied by Native Americans. In the first three years, the post collected more than 13,000 buffalo hides. When Juchereau died, the post was abandoned. The French colonial settlers left what they considered hostile territory in the Illinois Country, and relocated to Mobile (now in Alabama on the Gulf Coast), then the capital of La Louisiane.

The exact location of Juchereau's trading post has not been determined. Because the Buffalo Trace crossed the Wabash at Vincennes, some historians believe the post was at or near the site of the modern city of Vincennes. Some other historians place the post 50 miles to the south.

== Fort Vincennes ==
François-Marie Bissot, Sieur de Vincennes, acting under the authority of the French colony of Louisiana, constructed a fort in 1731–1732. The outpost was designed to secure the lower Wabash Valley for France, mostly by strengthening ties through trading with the Miami, Wea, and Piankashaw nations. It was named Fort Vincennes in honor of Vincennes, who had been burnt after being captured during a 1735 raid on the Chickasaw nation based to the south.

In 1736, Louis Groston de Saint-Ange de Bellerive assumed command of the post. He rebuilt the fort, also known as Fort Saint-Ange, and developed the post as a major trading center. He recruited Canadian traders to encourage indigenous people to settle there in order to develop stronger relations. By 1750, the Piankashaw had moved a village near the post.

After being defeated by the British in the Seven Years' War, in 1763 France ceded control of its territory in North America east of the Mississippi River to the British. On May 18, 1764, St. Ange was directed by the British to leave Fort Vincennes and assume command of Fort Chartres in Illinois Country along the upper Mississippi. He transferred command to Drouet de Richerville, a local citizen.

== Fort Sackville ==
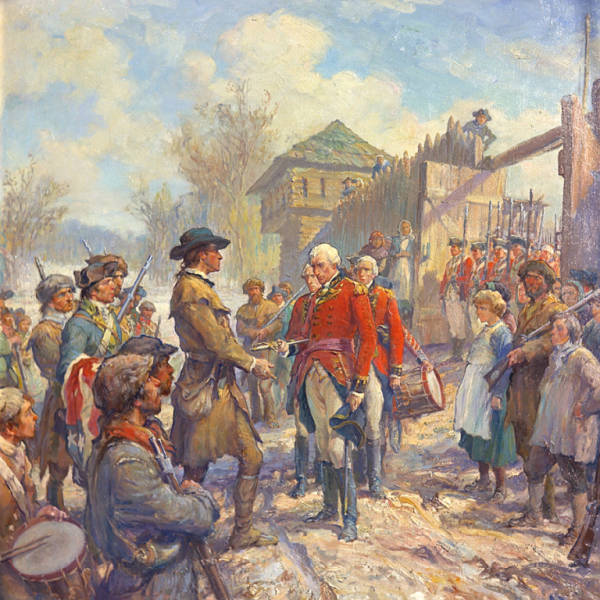
The Capture of Ft. Sackville by Frederick C. Yohn, 1923

British Lt. John Ramsey came to Vincennes in 1766. He took a census of the settlement, built up the fort, and renamed it Fort Sackville in honor of Lord George Sackville. The population around the fort grew quickly in the years that followed. A unique culture developed of regional Native Americans, ethnic French and British farmers, craftsmen, and traders. The site of Ft. Sackville was near the present-day intersection of First and Main Streets in Vincennes.

Following the Seven Years' War, known in the United States as the 'French and Indian War' the British and colonial governments could not afford the cost of maintaining frontier posts. They did not station troops in the Wabash Valley at all for a decade following the conflict. Fort Vincennes fell into disrepair, and the government ordered Vincennes to be evacuated due to ongoing lawlessness. The residents united and proved to the British authorities that they were permanent residents, not illegal squatters.

British neglect came to an end on June 2, 1774, when the British Parliament passed the Quebec Act, which enlarged the boundaries of the Province of Quebec to include the Ohio Country and Illinois Country. It reached to the Appalachian Mountains on the east, south to the Ohio River, west to the Mississippi River and north to the southern boundary of the Hudson's Bay Company-owned region of Rupert's Land. Lieutenant Governor Edward Abbott was sent to Vincennes without troops. Making the best of it, he rebuilt Fort Sackville. Abbott soon resigned, citing lack of support from the Crown.

In July 1778, Father Pierre Gibault arrived with news of the alliance between France and the newly declared United States. The Canadien residents took control of the unoccupied Fort Sackville, and Colonel George Rogers Clark sent Captain Leonard Helm to command the post. In December, a British force consisting of men from the 8th Regiment of Foot and the Detroit Militia under Lieutenant-Governor Henry Hamilton, based at Fort Detroit, retook Fort Sackville, and made Captain Helm a prisoner.

== Fort Patrick Henry ==
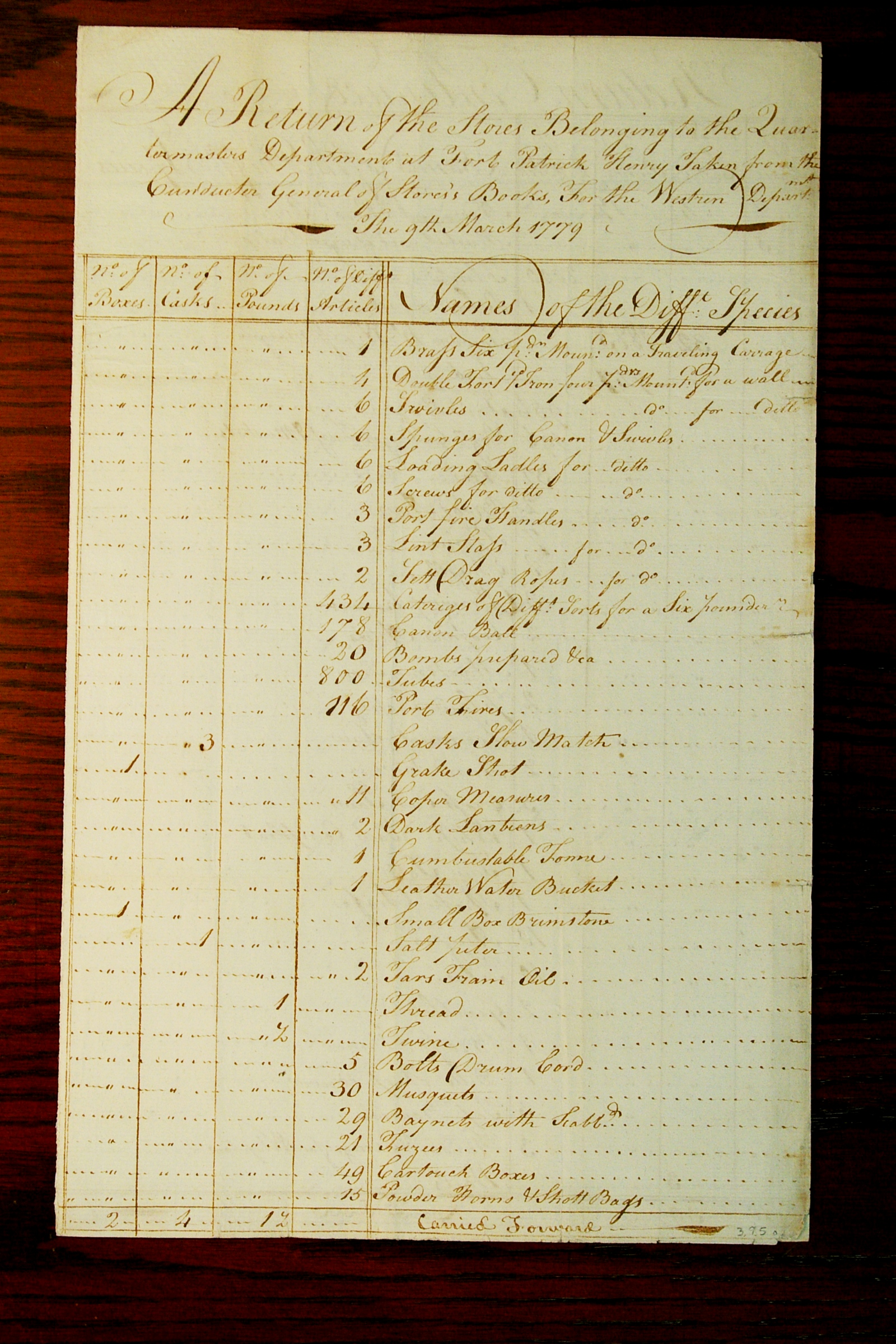
Return of the stores, quartermaster's department at Fort Patrick Henry, March 9, 1779

Lieutenant Colonel George Rogers Clark marched 130 men through 180 miles of wilderness to Vincennes in February 1779. As he entered town, the French settlers and native peoples joined his force to re-capture Fort Sackville. Clark let his native allies kill those of Hamilton as an example. He sent Hamilton and his British men to jail in Williamsburg, Virginia, the capital of the province, where Governor Thomas Jefferson held them as prisoners of war. Clark renamed the post as Fort Patrick Henry after the American patriot and Founding Father Patrick Henry.

In his wilderness campaigns in this territory, Clark sought to remove the British as a threat to Virginia's western settlements, in what became Kentucky but was then still part of the original colony. After accomplishing that objective, he returned south of the Ohio River to Kentucky, hoping to raise troops for an assault on British-held Fort Detroit, but he was unsuccessful. In spring 1780, the Virginia troops withdrew from the Vincennes fort, leaving it in the control of local militia.

After the Revolution, several dozen Kentucky families settled in Vincennes. Friction between these Americans, the ethnic French-dominated local government, and the native peoples resulted in Virginia Governor Patrick Henry to dispatching George Rogers Clark to command militia to the region. Clark reached Vincennes in 1786. His attempts to negotiate with the local native peoples were unsuccessful. He created an incident by seizing the goods of Spanish traders, which enraged the local population and risked war with Spain. Under orders from the new United States government, Clark and his men left Vincennes in the spring of 1787.

== Fort Knox I ==
In 1787, the US garrison under Major Jean François Hamtramck built a new fort a few blocks north of the old one and named it Fort Knox (usually referred to by local historians as Fort Knox I), after the U.S. Secretary of War. It was located at the present-day intersection of First and Buntin streets. During the relative peace with the British and most Native American tribes from 1787 to 1803, Fort Knox was the westernmost American military outpost. But the garrison at Fort Knox did not get along with the local population. In 1796, the garrison was ordered not to venture beyond 100 yards of Fort Knox. Territorial Governor William Henry Harrison petitioned Secretary of War Henry Dearborn for money to build a new fort.

== Fort Knox II ==
In 1803, the federal government approved $200 to build a new fort, and the War Department bought land for the new fort about three miles north of Vincennes, at a Wabash River landing called Petit Rocher, which offered a good view up the river. This fort was also called Fort Knox, and referred to locally as Fort Knox II. The sleepy little fort was known mostly as a site of duels (Captain Thorton Posey shot his second-in-command in 1811) and desertion.

But by 1811 disagreements between Gov. Harrison and Indian leader Tecumseh were reaching a head. Captain Zachary Taylor was put in charge of the fort. Late in 1811 Fort Knox II had its most important period when it was used as the muster point for Governor Harrison as he gathered his troops, both regular U.S. army and militia, prior to the march to Prophetstown and the Battle of Tippecanoe. After the battle, the troops returned to Fort Knox at Vincennes; several died there from their wounds.

In 1813, as the War of 1812 increased the chances of attacks on Vincennes by Native Americans, the military determined that Fort Knox was too far away to protect the town. Fort Knox II was disassembled, floated down the Wabash, and reassembled just a few yards from where Fort Knox I had been.

The former Fort Knox II site is now marked and preserved as a state and national historic site, close to present-day Ouabache State Park on the outskirts of Vincennes. The outline of the former fort has been marked with short posts, and there is interpretive signage in a park setting. It was added to the National Register of Historic Places in 1982.

== Fort Knox abandoned ==
After the war, the threat of attacks again decreased, and friction between residents and soldiers again became an issue. Since the Native American territories decreased and moved farther north, it was decided to move the garrison to Fort Harrison, near Terre Haute, where the troops had won a victory a few years before. On February 10, 1816, the garrison was ordered to Fort Harrison, and Fort Knox was abandoned. Within weeks, Vincennes residents had stripped the fort of all usable materials.

=== Commanders of Fort Knox (I and II) ===
Major John Hamtramck	1787	Took command of Fort Lernoult in 1796
Captain Thomas Pasteur		Ordered garrison to stay within 100 yards of Fort Knox on March 6, 1796; Given command of Fort Massac in 1798.
Captain Honest F. Johnston	1798	
Captain Cornelius Lyman	1802	Began construction of Fort Knox II
Captain George Rogers Clark Floyd	1809	Arrived with reinforcements due to Native American unrest, and assumed command
Captain Thornton Posey	1811	Arrived with reinforcements to help finish construction of Fort Knox II; Fled Vincennes after killing Lieutenant Jesse Jennings.
Captain Zachary Taylor	1811	Assumed command after Captain Posey fled
Lieutenant Josiah Bacon	1811	Bacon could not travel to the Battle of Tippecanoe due to an injury caused by a powder explosion, so he was left in temporary command of the fort.
Lieutenant Thomas H. Richardson	1813	Given command of construction of Fort Knox III; Captain Zachary Taylor assumed command when the fort was completed and the garrison moved in.
Major John Chunn	1814	Ordered to abandon Fort Knox and move garrison to Fort Harrison in 1816

The "Muster on the Wabash" is the annual Fall gathering of U.S. Army, U.S. Militia, British Mercenaries, and Native American reenactors dedicated to reliving the period's history at Fort Knox II.

== See also ==
- List of forts in Indiana

== Notes ==
- Allison, Harold (1986). The Tragic Saga of the Indiana Indians. Turner Publishing Company, Paducah. ISBN 0-938021-07-9.
- Cayton, Andrew R. L. (1996). Frontier Indiana. Bloomington, Indiana: Indiana University Press.
- Barnhart, John D; Riker, Dorothy L (1971). Indiana to 1816. The Colonial Period. Indianapolis: Indiana Historical Society. ISBN 0-87195-109-6.
- Derleth, August (1968). Vincennes: Portal to the West. Englewood Cliffs, NJ: Prentice-Hall. LCCN 68020537.
