= Henry Hamilton (colonial administrator) =

British Army officer and colonial administrator

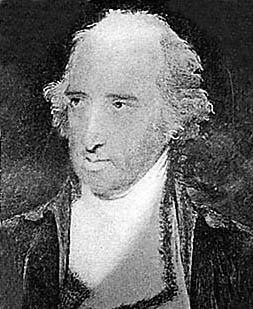
- Born: c. 1734; Dublin, Ireland
- Died: 29 September 1796 (aged 62); Antigua, British West Indies
- Other names: Hair Buyer, Hair-buyer General
- Occupations: Military officer, colonial administrator
- Spouse: Elizabeth Lee
- Children: Mary Anne Pierpoint Hamilton (daughter)
- Father: Henry Hamilton
- Relatives: Sackville Hamilton (brother); Frederick Hamilton (uncle); Gustavus Hamilton (uncle); Gustavus Hamilton, 1st Viscount Boyne (grandfather)

Signature
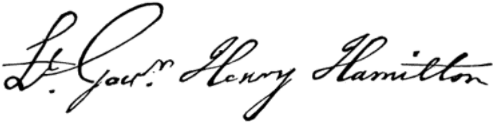

Henry Hamilton (c. 1734 – 29 September 1796) was a British Army officer and colonial administrator. He served in North America as Lieutenant Governor of the Province of Quebec and later as Deputy Governor after the American Revolutionary War. He later served as Governor of Bermuda and lastly, as Governor of Dominica, where he died in office.

In 1779, Hamilton was captured during the Revolutionary War by American forces at Fort Sackville while serving as the Lieutenant Governor and Superintendent of Indian Affairs at Fort Detroit. He was transported to Virginia, where Hamilton was held by Governor Thomas Jefferson's government until October 1780. He was then sent to New York and gained freedom in a prisoner exchange in 1781, being allowed to depart for London.

== Early life ==
Henry Hamilton was born in Dublin, Ireland, a younger son of Henry Hamilton, an Irish Member of Parliament, and his wife.

Hamilton was raised in County Cork, Ireland. His older brother Sackville Hamilton later served as a Privy Councillor and Under-Secretary to the Lord Lieutenant of Ireland. His direct paternal great-great-grandfather was Claud Hamilton, 1st Lord Paisley.

== Military career ==
As was typical of younger sons of the Protestant Ascendancy, Henry Hamilton entered the British Army. During the French and Indian War in North America, part of the Seven Years' War between Britain and France, he served as a captain in the 15th Regiment of Foot. They fought in the 1758 attack on Louisbourg and the Battle of Quebec. He was captured at Sainte-Foy in 1760, but a French officer switched coats with him to ease his apprehensions about Native Americans killing British officers.

With the support of Governor General of British North America Guy Carleton, Hamilton rose to the rank of brigade major. In 1775, he sold his commission, leaving the Army for a political career.

== American Revolutionary War ==
=== Lieutenant Governor and Superintendent of Indian Affairs at Fort Detroit ===
In 1775, Henry Hamilton was appointed as Lieutenant Governor and Superintendent of Indian Affairs at Fort Detroit, Province of Quebec (it then extended from the Atlantic to this area), British North America. (The fort site is now within the borders of Detroit, Michigan).

This was one of five newly created lieutenant governorships in the recently expanded eastern territory of Canada. When Governor Hamilton reached his base at Fort Detroit to assume his government duties in the Great Lakes region, the American Revolutionary War was already underway. Hamilton was in a difficult position: as a civil official, he had few British Army regulars at his command, and the loyalty of local Canadians and Indians was far from assured. Normand Macleod, a local fur trader and army officer, acted as the temporary "town major", a British government official in command of a fortified town, before Hamilton's arrival.

=== British war policies on the western frontier ===
Governor Henry Hamilton became adept at diplomacy with the Indians, establishing good relations with local Indian leaders of the Huron and Odawa tribes. An amateur artist, Hamilton also sketched portraits of many Indians while in Detroit, leaving what has been called the "earliest and largest collection of life portraits of Native Americans of the Upper Great Lakes." This is now held by Houghton Library at Harvard University.

At the beginning of the war, British policy encouraged neutrality among the Indians leaders. But in 1777 Hamilton received instructions to encourage Indian raids against American frontier settlements in Pennsylvania, Virginia, and Kentucky. Hamilton responded to Lord Germain, "Would to God this storm which is ready to fall on the Frontiers could be directed upon the guilty heads of those wretches who have raised it, and pass by the miserable many who must feel its fatal effects."

This was a controversial policy, because he and other British officials realised that Loyalists would inevitably be killed in these raids. Hamilton tried to limit civilian casualties by sending British Army regulars and Canadian militia alongside Indian raiding parties. Despite this, Indian warriors carried out their own customs during the raids, resulting in hundreds of women and children in Kentucky and western Pennsylvania being killed and scalped during the war. This, as feared, led to an increase in anti-British sentiment in the region. According to an early 20th-century local history, Americans on the frontier accused Hamilton of paying bounties for prisoners and scalps brought in by the Indian warriors, calling him the "Hair-buyer General". Hamilton denied ever paying Indians for scalps. He did, however, accept scalps as evidence of success, for which Indian war parties were rewarded with additional supplies.

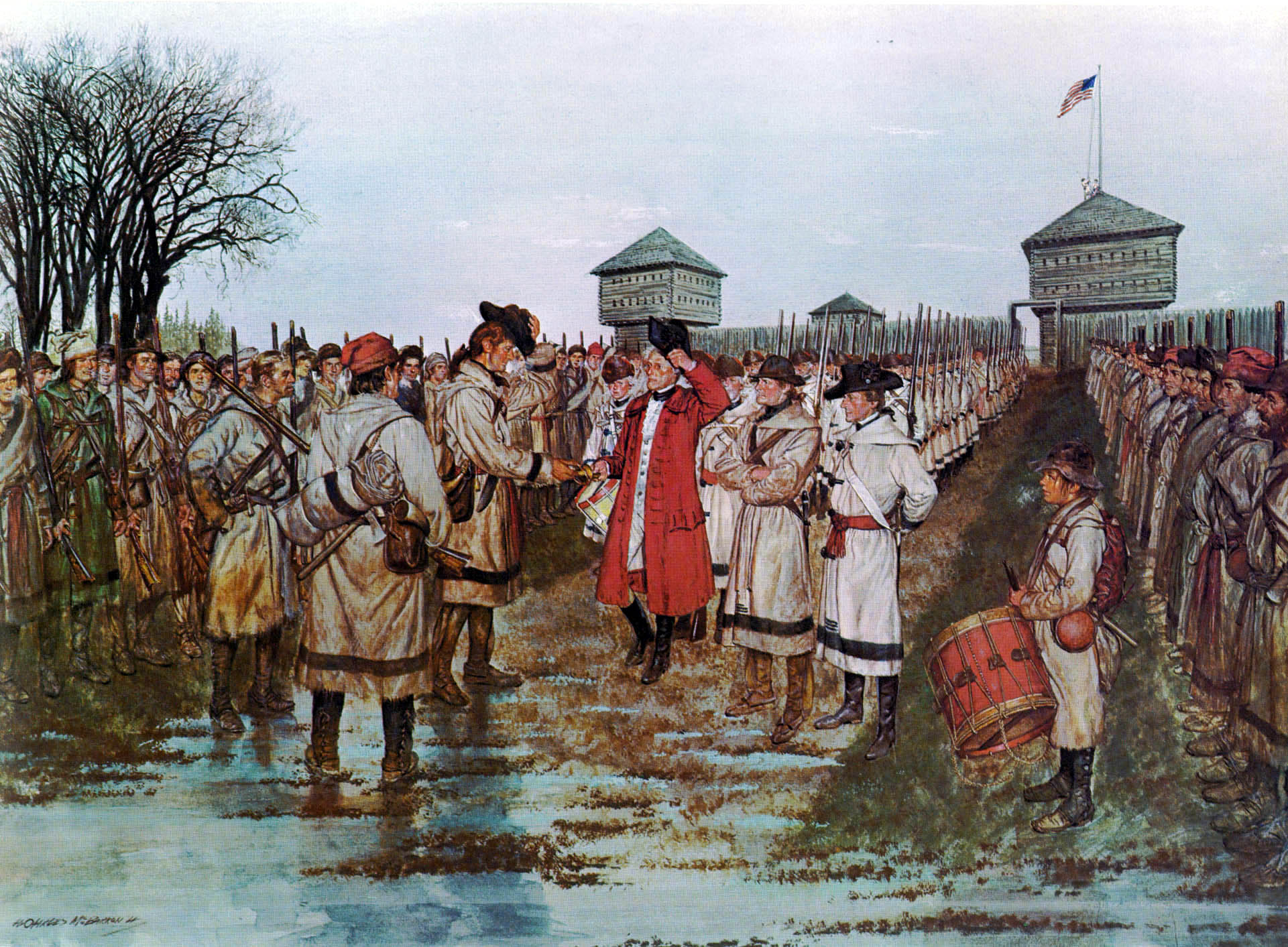
Hamilton surrendering to Clark in the Siege of Fort Vincennes

=== George Rogers Clark and Illinois Regiment, Virginia state forces in the Illinois Country ===
In 1778, Patriot Colonel George Rogers Clark, commanding Virginia state forces, captured several undermanned British posts in the Illinois Country, including Fort Sackville at Vincennes (then in Virginia-claimed land, now in present-day Indiana). Hamilton led an armed party from Detroit on 7 October 1778 to recapture the British post, 600 miles away. His small force gathered Indian warriors along the way, and entered Vincennes on 17 December 1778. They captured Fort Sackville and the American commandant, Captain Leonard Helm. In February 1779, however, Colonel Clark returned to Vincennes in a surprise march, recapturing the outpost and taking Hamilton prisoner.

=== Defeat and prisoner in Virginia ===
In early March, General George Rogers Clark ordered Hamilton to be taken to the Virginia state capital in Williamsburg as a prisoner of war. Poor travel conditions on the Ohio River forced the group—led by Captain Williams and Lieutenant Rogers—to travel most of the way by foot through the Moccasin Gap between what is now Kentucky and Virginia, finally arriving in Williamsburg in the middle of June. Once in Virginia's capital, he was jailed and placed in irons by order of Governor Thomas Jefferson and the Virginia Executive Council. Hamilton was held from 16 June – 29 September 1779. Hamilton rejected an offer of parole on the grounds that the terms violated his freedom of speech in restraining him from "saying anything to the prejudice of the United States." Jefferson refused to treat Hamilton and other British prisoners as prisoners-of-war and handled them as he would have handled escaped slaves: putting them in irons for 18 months in Williamsburg and Chesterfield. Governor Jefferson eventually dropped charges of scalp-buying, but did not release Hamilton until October 1780, and only after George Washington during several months had entreated him to accept his parole. Hamilton was sent to New York to await a prisoner exchange. This took place in March 1781. He immediately sailed to London, England on a British ship.

== Later career as British royal governor ==
Henry Hamilton was reassigned to Canada in 1782 under an appointment as Lieutenant-Governor, and later Deputy-Governor of the Province of Quebec. He administered during the transition in the postwar years as the Crown granted thousands of acres of land, mostly in what became Upper Canada, to Loyalists as compensation for their losses in the former Thirteen Colonies and as payment to soldiers.

After a few years, Hamilton was reassigned as royal Governor of Bermuda, serving from 1785 to 1794. He then departed Bermuda on HMS Scorpion (stopping enroute at Antigua on 4 December 1794) to serve as Governor of Dominica, the present-day Commonwealth of Dominica, from 1794 until his death in office in 1796. In March 1795, at age 61, Hamilton married 25-year-old Elizabeth Lee from Banbury, Oxfordshire, a daughter of Colonel Lee. The Hamiltons had one daughter together, Mary Anne Pierpoint Hamilton. She died in 1871, unmarried and without children.

== Death ==
Hamilton died in office on the island of Antigua, British North America, now Antigua and Barbuda, on 29 September 1796.

Among his papers, Hamilton had kept a journal from 1778 to 1779 as Lieutenant Governor at Fort Detroit during the American Revolution; this was published for the first time posthumously in 1951 in a history that addressed his and George Rogers Clark's roles in the war.

== In popular culture ==
US author Winston Churchill wrote an epic historical novel in 1904 called The Crossing covering a man's life in the old Northwest from the Revolution to the Burr Conspiracy. The first part is about the protagonist marching as a drummer boy with George Rogers Clark and the highlight is the capture of Vincennes from Hamilton. There is much information about Hamilton's activities and his reputation among the local backwoodsmen, based on research from original documents.
