= Isaac Ruddell =

- Born: c. 1737; Shenandoah County, Virginia Colony
- Died: January 1812; Bourbon County, Kentucky, United States
- Other name: Isaac Ruddle
- Occupations: Militia officer, Revolutionary War Virginia State Line officer and landowner
- Known for: Early Kentucky frontiersman and pioneer; founder of Ruddell's Station in Harrison County, Kentucky.
- Spouse: Elizabeth Bowman (m1750s-1812)
- Children: 5 children
- Relatives: George Bowman, father-in-law Isaac Bowman, brother-in-law Joseph Bowman, brother-in-law John Jacob Bowman, brother-in-law John M. Ruddell, grandson

Captain Isaac Ruddell (1737 – January 1812) was an 18th-century American Virginia State Line officer during the American Revolutionary War and a Kentucky frontiersman. He was an officer commanding a company under BGEN George Rogers Clark (1777–1782). He was the founder of Ruddell's Station, or fort, on the Licking River in present-day Harrison County, Kentucky. In 1780, during the Revolutionary War, the settlement was destroyed by joint British Canadian and Eastern Woodlands Indian forces under British officer Captain Henry Bird. He and his family were held prisoner in Detroit for over two years before their release. Two of his sons were later taken captive by Shawnee, one of them becoming adopted brother of the famed warrior Tecumseh.

He was also a brother-in-law to Kentucky pioneers Isaac, Joseph and John Jacob Bowman. His grandson, John M. Ruddell, was a prominent Kentucky statesman and landowner.

== Biography ==
After Ruddell was born in Nottingham, Pennsylvania, his family moved to Virginia in the early 1740s. Ruddell became a captain in the Washington County militia. He married Elizabeth Bowman in Shenandoah County on 6 March 1797. In 1774 or 1775, he accompanied the Bowmans to Kentucky and while living in Boonesborough, Ruddell joined his brother-in-law John Bowman who was en route to Harrodsburg with two Virginia militia companies. Ruddell would later replace John Dunkin as one of Bowman's officers. He also served under General George Rogers Clark during the Illinois campaign, in charge of the Corn Island party and of the military stores left there. For his service, he was awarded 3,234 acres (13.09 km^{2}) of Clark's Grant in the Indiana Territory.

In the Spring of 1779, he established a fortified settlement on the South fork of the Licking River known as Ruddell's Station (or Fort Liberty) in Harrison County one mile (1.6 km) from present-day Lair Station. The fort was built on the site of Hinkson's Station which was previously abandoned several years before. Along with Martin's Station, located on Stoner Creek near present-day Paris, the settlement became home to a large number of Pennsylvania German families over the next year. In 1780, during the American Revolutionary War, an Indian (including Shawnee) raiding party of 600-900 led by British officer Captain Henry Bird and 150 British soldiers left at least twenty settlers dead. Isaac Ruddell was captain of the fort, and was in command of the militiamen present. When the British brought out artillery to knock down the walls to enable the Indians to massacre the defending families, he decided it was better to surrender. The approximately 470 survivors, along with Ruddell and his wife, and captives from Martin's Station, were force-marched to Detroit where they remained prisoners until the end of the war.

During the march to Detroit, Ruddell was separated from his wife and children. Shortly after arriving in Detroit, Ruddell protested to the commandant of Bird disregarding his agreement of safe passage in exchange for their surrender. He was reunited with his wife and two daughters, however his two sons were turned over to the Shawnee who were eventually adopted by the tribe. Stephen Ruddell, 12 years old at the time of the attack, was accepted into the family of Chief Blackfish and eventually became the adopted brother of Tecumseh. The younger son, Abraham Ruddell, when repatriated from the Indians, by the War Department in 1794 could barely speak English and later settled in Arkansas.

Shortly after their arrival in Detroit, Ruddell and his family were allowed to live on a nearby island where they grew corn and supplied food for their fellow prisoners. He also reportedly helped several men to escape from the camp. He and several other prisoners were allowed to return to Virginia in 1782. Soon after arriving, however, Ruddell was accused by several of his fellow prisoners of collaborating with the British and was charged with treason in Frederick County but was acquitted. His friendship with the commandant is thought to have been based on Byrd's poor treatment of Ruddle's party as well as both men belonging to the Masonic fraternity.

Ruddell gave a written account of the attack which began appearing in newspapers in late 1783. Returning to Bourbon County in 1784, they built a home at the head of the Licking River four years later. He also built a grist mill on the northside of Hinkston Bridge and, in 1795, a sawmill which was operated by his son Abram. The town is still in existence, known today as Ruddell's Mills. He also donated land to the Stoner Mouth Church and cemetery. He died in January 1812.

In 2008, the Ruddell and Martin Stations Historical Association dedicated a new monument for Captain Ruddell.
