= Abraham Bowman =

American politician (1749–1837)

- Born: October 16, 1749 near Strasburg, Virginia Colony
- Died: November 9, 1837 (aged 88); Lexington, Kentucky, United States
- Known for: Early Kentucky pioneer, landowner and statesman; American Revolutionary War officer and commander of the "German Regiment".
- Spouse: Sarah Henry (1782–1837)
- Parent(s): George Bowman and Mary Hite
- Relatives: Jost Hite, grandfather John Jacob Bowman, brother Capt. Isaac Bowman, brother Maj. Joseph Bowman, brother Col. John Bowman, brother John Bryan Bowman, grandson

Colonel Abraham Bowman (October 16, 1749 – November 9, 1837) was an 18th-century American frontiersman and American Revolutionary War military officer. Bowman served as an officer and later commanded the 8th Virginia Regiment popularly known as the "German Regiment".

He and his brothers Colonel John Bowman (1738–1784), Major Joseph Bowman (c. 1752 – 1779), and Captain Isaac Bowman (1757–1826) were among the earliest settlers in Kentucky and were excellent horsemen known as the "Four Centaurs of Cedar Creek". His grandson, John Bryan Bowman, founded Kentucky University and the Agricultural and Mechanical College of Kentucky. His father George Bowman and grandfather Jost Hite were both well-known Virginian pioneers and the first to explore and settle Shenandoah Valley.

== Biography ==
Born to George Bowman and Mary Hite (the eldest daughter of Jost Hite), he was raised on the Bowman family estate on Cedar Creek near Strasburg, Virginia. In 1766, the 17-year-old Bowman played a prominent role in the defence of the area against an Indian raiding party. When one of his neighbors, the daughter of George Miller, arrived at his home seeking help from an Indian raiding party, he took a gun and rode to Miller's home where he was joined by another young man, Thomas Newell. However, they arrived too late to save Miller and his family who were found "weltering in their own blood". He and Newell were part of the party who pursued the raiders and, overtaking them at South Branch Mountain, killed one of them and rescued a Rachel Dellinger. Her infant child had been killed by her captors near the Capon River.

He was one of the first justices of the peace in Shenandoah County during 1772 and 1773 as well as being appointed a justice in Dunmore County, Virginia, in 1774. He and three other brothers arrived in Kentucky during the mid-1770s, later helping establish and settle Bowman Station and present-day Fayette County, Kentucky. He was also a close friend of fellow frontiersman Daniel Boone and was part of the expedition which explored Dick's River.

He enlisted in the Virginia militia shortly before the American Revolutionary War and, commissioned a lieutenant-colonel by the Virginia Convention on January 12, 1776, he served under Colonel Peter Muhlenberg in the 8th Virginia Regiment, otherwise known as the famous "German Regiment" of the Virginia Line. He participated in battles at Ticonderoga, Monmouth, Germantown and Valley Forge. Made a full colonel in March 1777, he assumed command of the regiment after Muhlenberg was made a brigadier general and led in regiment during the Battle of Brandywine and Yorktown, where he led the last charge against the enemy redoubts. Among the Kentucky veterans awarded land grants by the federal government at Clark's Grant, Bowman received the largest with 7,590 acres (30.7 km^{2}).

Resigning his commission in 1779, he returned to Kentucky with a party of 30 families that fall and founded Bowman's Station in Madison County, Kentucky. Settling in Fayette County many years later, he also participated in defending Kentucky against Indian raids with his brother John, Colonel-Commandant of the Kentucky County Militia.

He later became a prominent landowner in Kentucky County eventually acquiring 8,000 acres (32 km^{2}) six miles (10 km) southwest of Lexington and later constructed one of the first brick houses to be built in the state. He often entertained former Revolutionary War veterans, most notably General Marquis de Lafayette when he stayed in Lexington in 1824. Active in politics, Bowman was elected on first bench of justices in Lincoln County, Kentucky and later represented Fayette County in the Kentucky constitutional convention in 1825.

He died at his estate near Lexington, Kentucky, on November 9, 1837, at the age of 88. He was survived by his wife, Sarah Henry, and their children.
