= Fort Bowman =

Historic house in Virginia, United States

- U.S. National Register of Historic Places
- U.S. Historic district
- Virginia Landmarks Register
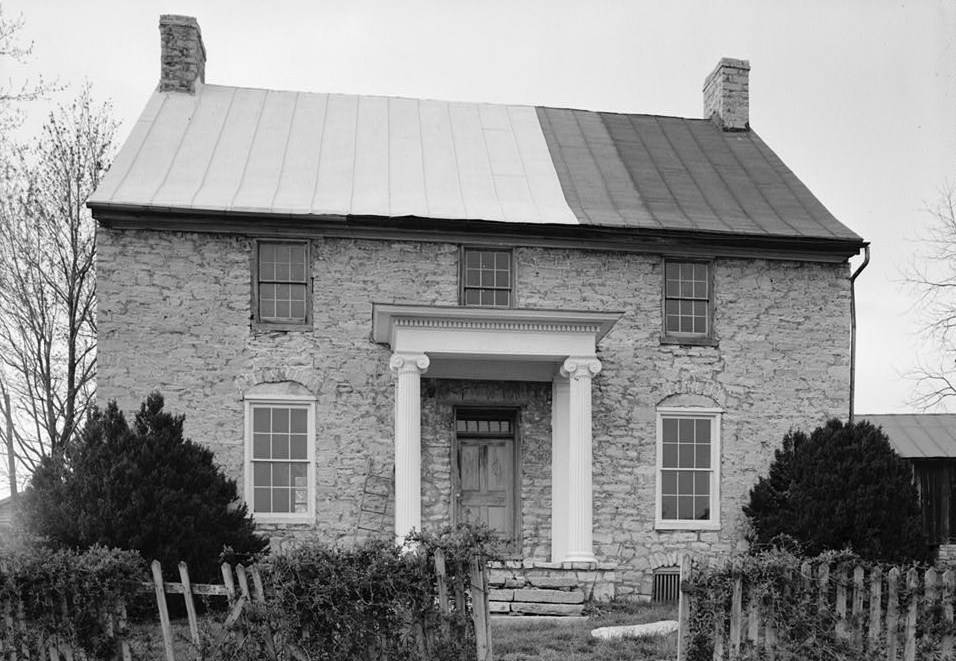
- Fort Bowman, HABS Photo, April 1971

- Location within Virginia Location within the United States
- Location: Northeast of junction of Rtes. 660 and U.S. 11, near Middletown, Virginia
- Coordinates: 39°00′12″N 78°19′43″W
- Area: 0 acres (0 ha)
- Built: 1753
- NRHP reference No.: 69000279
- VLR No.: 085-0004

Significant dates
- Added to NRHP: November 25, 1969
- Designated VLR: November 5, 1968

Fort Bowman, also known as Harmony Hall, is a historic home and national historic district located near Middletown, Frederick County, Virginia. It was built in 1753, by Pennsylvania German settler George Bowman (1699–1768), father of Colonel John Bowman (1738-1784), Colonel Abraham Bowman (1749-1837), Major Joseph Bowman (c. 1752–1779), and Captain Isaac Bowman (1757-1826). Abraham Bowman was the colonel of the 8th Virginia Regiment in the Revolutionary War. It is a two-story, rectangular limestone building with a gable roof. The interior retains its original woodwork. It has a later kitchen wing and iron and wood portico. Also on the property are a contributing dairy / smokehouse and the Bowman graveyard, which includes the grave of Isaac Bowman.

It was listed on the National Register of Historic Places in 1969.
