= Alpheus Michael Bowman =

American politician (1847–1913)

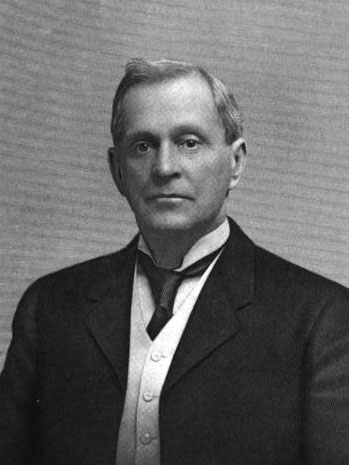
- Born: January 11, 1847; Rockingham County, Virginia, United States
- Died: August 2, 1913 (aged 66); Salem, Virginia
- Other name: A.M. Bowman
- Education: New Market Academy
- Occupations: Businessman, politician
- Political party: Democratic Party
- Spouse: Mary E. Killian (m. 1869)
- Children: 8 children
- Parent(s): George Bowman and Sarah V. Zeigler
- Relatives: Isaac Bowman, grandfather

Alpheus Michael Bowman (January 11, 1847 – August 2, 1913) was an American politician and businessman. He was a prominent figure in the ranching and livestock industry, either belonging to or serving in important positions, on various business associations. His involvement in these organizations included promoting improved livestock breeding and preserving records of pedigrees. He also had a successful political career as one of the top consultants in the Democratic Party, serving on the executive and financial committees up until the turn of the 20th century.

He was a grandson of Kentucky frontiersman Isaac Bowman, as well as direct descendant of early Virginia pioneers Jost Hite and George Bowman, Sr.

== Biography ==
Alpheus Michael Bowman was born in Rockingham County, Virginia to George Bowman and Sarah V. Zeigler. His father was a successful farmer and stock-breeder in addition to being the county magistrate. He was raised in the country and attended local schools, as well as the New Market Academy, however most of his time was spent tending to the livestock with his father.

At age 16, Bowman enlisted as a private in the Virginia Cavalry and served for two years until his capture in March 1865. He was held as a prisoner-of-war in Fort Delaware until June 1, 1865. During Reconstruction in Virginia, he became a successful farmer and stock raiser in Augusta County and later Saltville. He moved, this time to Roanoke County, where he was the personal manager of the Bowman family stockyard and president of the Diamond Orchard Company, one of the largest businesses east of the Allegheny Mountains and north of Georgia. He would serve in a number of high level positions including 11 years as a member of the executive committee of the American Shorthorn Breeders' Association, vice president of the American Berkshire Association and first president of the American Saddle Horse Association. He was also a life member of the American Jersey Cattle Club. He himself was one of the largest exporters of cattle in the region and as far away as Europe and South America.

He entered politics during the early 1870s attending every state Democratic Convention held since 1873, with the exception of one. Bowman became a member of the Democratic Party executive committee in 1883 and later assisted in the successful election of John S. Barbour over William Mahone in 1883. He later served as a member of the Democratic state committee for 12 years, chairman of the 9th congressional district committee for six years and chairman of the Roanoke County Democratic committee for a number of years. He was also a delegate to the Democratic National Convention at St. Louis, Missouri in 1888.

In 1901, he was elected to the Virginia House of Delegates from Roanoke County. Appointed a member of the finance committee, he successfully secured $50,000 to be used to represent Virginia in the St. Louis World's Fair and was later tasked by then Governor Andrew Jackson Montague as a senior member of the commission. Reelected in 1903, and again in 1905, he continued on the finance committee serving as its chairman during his third and final term. He used the large surplus which had accumulated in the state treasury to reduce the state debt, double funding for schools, provided money to the Jamestown exposition (later serving on the state commission) and increased annuities to state colleges. He was one of the commissioners assigned to the remodeling the state capitol building at Richmond, Virginia. Following the death of Peter Otey, he became the favorite to succeed him as state representative. Despite strong public support, he lost the election.

He was a member of the board of trustees of Roanoke College and secretary of its finance committee as well as vice president on the board of trustees at the Southern Lutheran Orphan home. He served on the board of visitors of Virginia Polytechnic Institute from 1911 to 1914. He also served four years on the board of directors of the Southwestern Hospital for the Insane in Marion and the Central State Hospital in Petersburg, Virginia. A member of the Southern Lutheran Church, he was an elder in the College Church in Salem, Virginia. He died at his home in Salem, Virginia after a long illness on August 2, 1913.
