= John Bryan Bowman =

American lawyer and educator (1824–1891)

- Born: October 16, 1824; Mercer County, Kentucky, United States
- Died: September 21, 1891 (aged 66); Harrodsburg, Kentucky
- Education: Bacon College
- Occupations: Landowner and educator
- Known for: Trustee of Bacon College; founder of Kentucky University, the University of Kentucky, and Agricultural and Mechanical College of Kentucky.
- Title: Regent of Kentucky University
- Term: 1858-1878
- Spouse: Mary Dorcas Williams (m. 1846–1891)
- Parent(s): John Bowman and Mary Mechum
- Relatives: Abraham Bowman, grandfather Sarah Henry, grandmother Isaac Bowman, granduncle Joseph Bowman, granduncle John Jacob Bowman, granduncle

John Bryan Bowman (October 16, 1824 – September 21, 1891) was an American lawyer and educator, most notably as the founder of Kentucky University and the Agricultural and Mechanical College of Kentucky. He was the grandson of Kentucky frontiersman Abraham Bowman, as well as the grandnephew of Isaac, Joseph and John Jacob Bowman. His great-grandfathers were noted Virginia colonists George Bowman and Jost Hite.

== Biography ==
Born to John Bowman and Mary Mechum/Mitchum in Mercer County, Kentucky. John Bryan Bowman's father John Bowman studied law under Henry Clay and became licensed to practice law in 1809, and inherited in 1825 the house, Bellevue, from his first cousin, John Bowman Jr., son of Col. John Bowman Sr., brother of Col. Abraham Bowman. John Bryan Bowman was a member of the Disciples of Christ and attended Bacon College; his father being an incorporator and trustee. Upon graduation in 1842, Bowman studied law under Major James Taylor and was admitted to the bar, although he did not become a practicing lawyer. Four years later, he married Mary Dorcas Williams and settled down as a farmer after inheriting the Old Forest Farm in Mercer County. Managing the property for the next ten years, he became a successful farmer and landowner.

He was also a trustee Bacon College until the close of his old alma mater. In 1857, he led a campaign to found a new academic institution, Kentucky University, on the site of the defunct college administrated by the Disciples of Christ. He proposed to the other trustees to organize a fundraiser to raise $100,000 for an endowment, one-third of the proceeds to be raised in Mercer County. With the assistance of Major James Taylor, he was successful in gathering $30,000 in his county and, traveling to nearby communities, gained $150,000 within five months. Due to his efforts, the Kentucky Legislature granted a charter in Harrodsburg on January 15, 1858.

Named a regent by the Kentucky state legislature, he oversaw the later merging of Kentucky and Transylvania University in Lexington, Kentucky in 1865. During the time, he also founded and organized the Agricultural and Mechanical College of Kentucky as an extension of the new Lexington university. Under his administration, Bowman's liberal-minded policies saw Kentucky University grow as a modern center for education and learning during the next several years.

He remained its chief executive administrative and financial officer, a position he held for over twenty years until he resigned in 1874. Following his retirement however, criticism from both his church and the state eventually caused the withdrawal of the state A&M college in 1878, and the board of curators abolished the office of regent.

In 1887, he moved to the New Mexico Territory due to his wife's poor health. In his later years, he became a prominent resident in the Las Cruces-area and was active in promoting industrial interests in the territory serving two years as the general manager of the Southern New Mexico Fair Association. He was involved in the organization of Hocker College, the College of the Bible and Commercial College. Returning to Harrodsburg, he died at the home of his brother-in-law John Augustus Williams on September 22, 1891. He was buried in Lexington Cemetery.
