= Isaac Bowman =

American soldier and militia officer (1757–1826)

- Born: April 24, 1757; Ft Bowman on Cedar Creek (near Strasburg, Virginia)
- Died: September 9, 1826 (aged 69); Strasburg, Virginia
- Occupations: Landowner, farmer and militia officer
- Known for: Officer under General George Rogers Clark during the Illinois campaign and Northwest Indian War; held in two-year captivity by the Chickasaw before his eventual escape to Cuba.
- Spouses: Elizabeth Gatewood (m. 1782–1790) Mary Chinn (m. 1792–1826)
- Children: 16 children
- Parent(s): George Bowman and Mary Hite
- Relatives: Jost Hite, grandfather Col Abraham Bowman, brother Maj Joseph Bowman, brother Col Johannes "John" Bowman, brother John Jacob Bowman, brother

Isaac Bowman (April 24, 1757 – September 9, 1826) was an 18th-century American soldier and militia officer who took part in the American Revolutionary War and the Northwest Indian War. His capture and eventual escape from hostile Chickasaw led him on a two-year adventure before returning to the United States from Cuba in 1782.

His brothers, Colonel John Bowman (1738–1784), Colonel Abraham Bowman (1749–1837), and Major Joseph Bowman (c. 1752–1779), were also officers during the Revolutionary War, and all four were early frontiersman who were among the first to settle in Kentucky. Their father and grandfather, George Bowman and Jost Hite, respectively, were also prominent pioneers in the Colony of Virginia.

One of his patrilineal descendants, Alpheus Michael Bowman, was a successful Virginia businessman and politician during the late 19th century. Another of his descendants is William Irving Shuman, a banker and assistant U.S. Treasurer in Chicago, Illinois. Another descendant is Euday Bowman, composer of the 12th Street Rag.

== Biography ==
=== Early life ===
The youngest child born to George Bowman and Mary Hite, Isaac Bowman grew up at Fort Bowman aka Harmony Hall on Cedar Creek, only two miles south of present-day Strasburg. He inherited part of the family estate, including the Bowman mansion, upon the death of his father in 1768. During the mid-1770s, he accompanied his cousin Isaac Hite and brothers Abraham, Joseph, and John to Kentucky where, in 1775, he and the other thirteen pioneers carved their names into a beech tree in Warren County, Kentucky. Isaac Bowman did not become a major landowner as his brothers did, most likely due to his age.

=== Service during the American Revolution ===
In 1778, at age 21, he enlisted in the Illinois Militia and participated in General George Rogers Clark's Illinois campaign serving as a lieutenant and quartermaster under his brother Major Joseph Bowman. During this time, he was assigned to escort a number of high-level British officials and military officers as prisoners-of-war from Fort Vincennes to Williamsburg, Virginia, including Governor Henry Hamilton and Philippe-François de Rocheblave. He also delivered messages, including letters from his brother Joseph describing the progress of the expedition. Returning to Illinois, he was reportedly present at the capture of Fort Vincennes and attended the burial of his brother in August 1779. He also paid the expense of the services. He was one of the officers awarded a land allotment in Clark's Grant, Bowman being given 2,156 acres (8.73 km^{2}) for his services. Part of his land was used to build Jeffersonville, Indiana, in 1802, the city eventually becoming the county seat of Clark County.

=== Capture by the Chickasaw ===
In November 1779, shortly after the campaigns' end, he was placed in charge of a small party of settlers by John Todd, a party which was to be escorted from Kaskaskia to Kentucky County. Bowman was also entrusted with a number of articles belonging to the commonwealth of Virginia, which he was to deliver to the lieutenant governor. According to Todd in a letter to Governor Thomas Jefferson on June 2, 1780, he reported,

Mr. Isaac Bowman, with seven or eight men and one family, set off from Kaskaskia on November 18th last in a batteau, attended by another batteau with twelve men and three or four families in it, bound to the falls of the Ohio. I judged it safer to send to the falls many articles belonging to the commonwealth, by Bowman, than to bring them myself by land. Bowman's batteau fell into the hands of Chickasaw Indians and the other arrived in March or April at the French Lick on Cumberland, with the account that Bowman and all the men except one Riddle (Ruddle) were killed and taken.

It was long assumed that Bowman had been killed defending the party against the Chickasaw. However, he survived the battle and was, in fact, taken prisoner by his attackers. He was treated harshly and was tortured by his captors being "subjected to every torture, short of death, that the cruel savages could devise". However, he was eventually taken in by the tribe and was made an adopted son of one of the chieftains. He was later chosen as a son-in-law and, although the details of this marriage are unrecorded, there is an account of members of the Lewis and Clark expedition who, in 1804, encountered an Indian woman who had the name of a "J. Bowman" tattooed on her arm.

Bowman eventually escaped from Indian country with the help of a local Indian trader, possibly a Spaniard, who left with him for Cuba and eventually made his way to the United States. Accounts differ as to the exact circumstances of his escape, another being that he was purchased by a man named Turnbull for a keg of whiskey and remained in his service until his debt was repaid.

=== Later years ===
Following his return to Shenandoah in 1782, he married an Elizabeth Gatewood, with whom he had four children. After her death eight years later, he married Mary Chinn and had another nine additional children. He settled down at Fort Bowman estate and became a prosperous farmer and landowner. In 1812 or 1813, he constructed a large brick mansion he called Mount Pleasant on the family estate where he lived with his family until his death on September 9, 1826.

The house was located on the high bank above Cedar Creek, two miles (3 km) northeast of Strasburg and within half a mile of his birthplace at Ft Bowman built by his father in 1753. As of 1895, the house was still in existence although unoccupied.
