= John Bowman (pioneer) =

American militia officer (1738–1784)

Col. Johannes "John" Bowman
- Born: Johannes Bowman; 17 December 1738; Cedar Creek, Shenandoah Valley, Orange/Frederick County, Virginia Colony
- Died: 4 May 1784 (aged 45); Bowman Station, Burgin, Lincoln/Mercer County, Kentucky, US
- Resting place: Bowman Family Graveyard
- Known for: Early Kentucky pioneer and militia officer
- Title: Commissioner of Botetourt County of Virginia Colony, Safety Committee member in Harrodsburg in Kentucky County, First Kentucky County Lieutenant, Colonel in the Revolutionary War, Military Governor of Kentucky County Virginia, Sheriff and presiding Justice of the Peace of Lincoln County in the state of Kentucky.
- Term: 1770–1784
- Successor: Benjamin Logan
- Spouse: Elizabeth McClung (c. 1731–1784)
- Children: 1
- Relatives: Jacob Bowman, brother

Col. Johannes "John" Bowman (17 December 1738 – May 4, 1784) was an 18th-century American pioneer, colonial militia officer and sheriff, the first appointed in Lincoln County, Kentucky. In 1781 he also presided as a justice of the peace over the first county court held in Kentucky. The first county-lieutenant and military governor of Kentucky County during the American Revolutionary War, Col. Bowman also, served in the American Revolution, many times, second in command to General George Rogers Clark, during the Illinois Campaign, which, at the time, doubled the size of the United States.

He and brothers Joseph, Isaac and Abraham Bowman were excellent horsemen and later known as the "Four Centaurs of Cedar Creek", all of whom were among the earliest pioneers to settle in Kentucky and prominent officers in the Continental Army. He was the brother-in-law of frontiersmen Isaac Ruddell, Lorentz Stephens, Deyerle, George Wright, Henry Richardson and George Brinker. His grandnephew, Abraham's grandson John Bryan Bowman, founded Kentucky University and the Agricultural and Mechanical College of Kentucky. He is the younger brother of Jacob Bowman.

== Biography ==
=== Early life ===
Born to Virginia pioneer George Bowman and Mary Hite (daughter of pioneer Jost Hite) on Cedar Creek in Orange later Frederick County, Virginia, he is first recorded as a captain in the local militia in 1760. Living in Botetourt County during the late 1760s, he was a witness to the land deed of Andrew Miller, heir-at-law of John Miller, to Israel Christian for a tract of land (81 acres) in southern Catawba later donated to build the first county courthouse and other public buildings. During that same year, he acted as an appraiser for the estate of David Bryan.

In July 1768, he sold his share of the inheritance received from his father's death, 545 acres (2.21 km^{2}) of the Bowman family estate in Linvel's Creek, and settled on the Roanoke. He was later recommended a justice of the peace in Augusta County in June 1769 and was appointed as commissioner of Botetourt County following its official incorporation into Virginia Colony.

Marrying Elizabeth McClung who was the widow of David Bryan and eight years his senior, he was involved in a minor legal dispute during the early 1770s over land which Bryan had directed in his will be sold to William Cox upon his death. He successfully acquired the 166 acres (0.67 km^{2}) along Glade Creek and kept it as part of the Bryan estate until selling the Glade Creek claim to Esam Hannan and the rest of the estate to Toliver Craig, Sr. shortly before moving his family to Bowman's Station. He fought at the Battle of Point Pleasant.

=== Soldier and frontiersman ===
Visiting Kentucky in 1775, he served on the safety committee at Harrodsburg the following summer and was appointed as Colonel of the Kentucky militia by Virginia Governor Patrick Henry in the fall. The following year, Bowman was named as the first county-lieutenant of Kentucky County on July 14 and, with his officers Captains Henry Pauling and John Dunkin, marched with two companies numbering 100 men from Holston River area to Kentucky County stopping at Boonesborough on August 1 and Logan's Fort on August 26 before finally arriving at Harrodsburg on September 2. Immediately after his arrival, he was elected a presiding judge in the first court of quarter sessions held at Fort Harrod and included Richard Callaway, John Floyd, John Todd and sheriff Benjamin Logan on September 2, 1777.

During the Illinois campaign, he received a message from General George Rogers Clark shortly after the capture of Kaskaskia requesting support for his planned campaign into Detroit. Promising Clark at least 300 men, Bowman began gathering men and provisions during the spring of 1779.

Accompanied by Benjamin Logan and Levi Todd, Bowman led between 160 and 300 militiamen against the Shawnee town of Old Chillicothe May 29. Dividing their forces, he and Logan attacked the camp from both sides but their forces were eventually repulsed. Unable to draw the Shawnee from their single blockhouse, Bowman burned much of the camp and left with 163 horses valued at $32,000. He and his men repulsed the Shawnee as they marched two days south to meet Clark at the mouth of the Licking River. Militia casualties were 8 killed and 4 wounded; Indian loses were about 4-5 killed (Including Chief Blackfish (died of wounds) and Chief Red Hawk killed Later they participated in Clark's expedition along the Little Miami and Ohio River.

Although initially blamed for not taking the Indian blockhouse, as well as the dozen casualties suffered, Bowman and Logan were credited with the raid at Chillicothe as a major victory for the Kentuckians. With the destruction of a major Shawnee settlement and the death of Chief Blackfish, additional Indian war parties were discouraged from moving against Kentucky colonists. According to Theodore Roosevelt in The Winning of the West, "the expedition undoubtedly accomplished more than Clark's attack on Piqua next year."

In the fall of 1779, he and Col. Abraham was instrumental in the founding Bowman's Station on Cane Run in present-day Mercer County, Kentucky. Originally housing seven families during the "Hard Winter" of 1779–80, the settlement grew to thirty families during the next year. Bowman's position was reaffirmed by then Governor Thomas Jefferson and he used the settlement as his base of operations. He was often traveling to organize the defense of Kentucky County.

=== Later years and death ===
In 1781, Bowman became the first sheriff and county-lieutenant of Lincoln County, Kentucky. He also presided over the first county court held in Kentucky, when he and several others were appointed justice of the peace on January 16, 1781. Benjamin Logan succeeded him as County-Lieutenant in July 1781 and Sheriff in November 1783.

Settling down at Bowman Station, founded by him and brother Col. Abraham Bowman, Bowman spent his last years at his home. He hired local residents to tap the maple trees on his property and sold the sugar for a substantial profit. Falling ill, Bowman died at his home on May 4, 1784. Although said to be opinionated and quick to anger, he was both admired and respected by fellow settlers for his bravery.

Following his death, his brother Abraham served as executor of his estate. In customary fashion, his widow Elizabeth McClung /Bryan /Bowman received one-third of his property with the remainder going towards the education of his son. John Bowman, Jr. built a fine brick mansion he called the Mt. Pleasant Estate, which is still standing near Ft. Bowman and his father's old station.
