= William Irving Shuman =

American businessman, banker and activist (1882-1958)

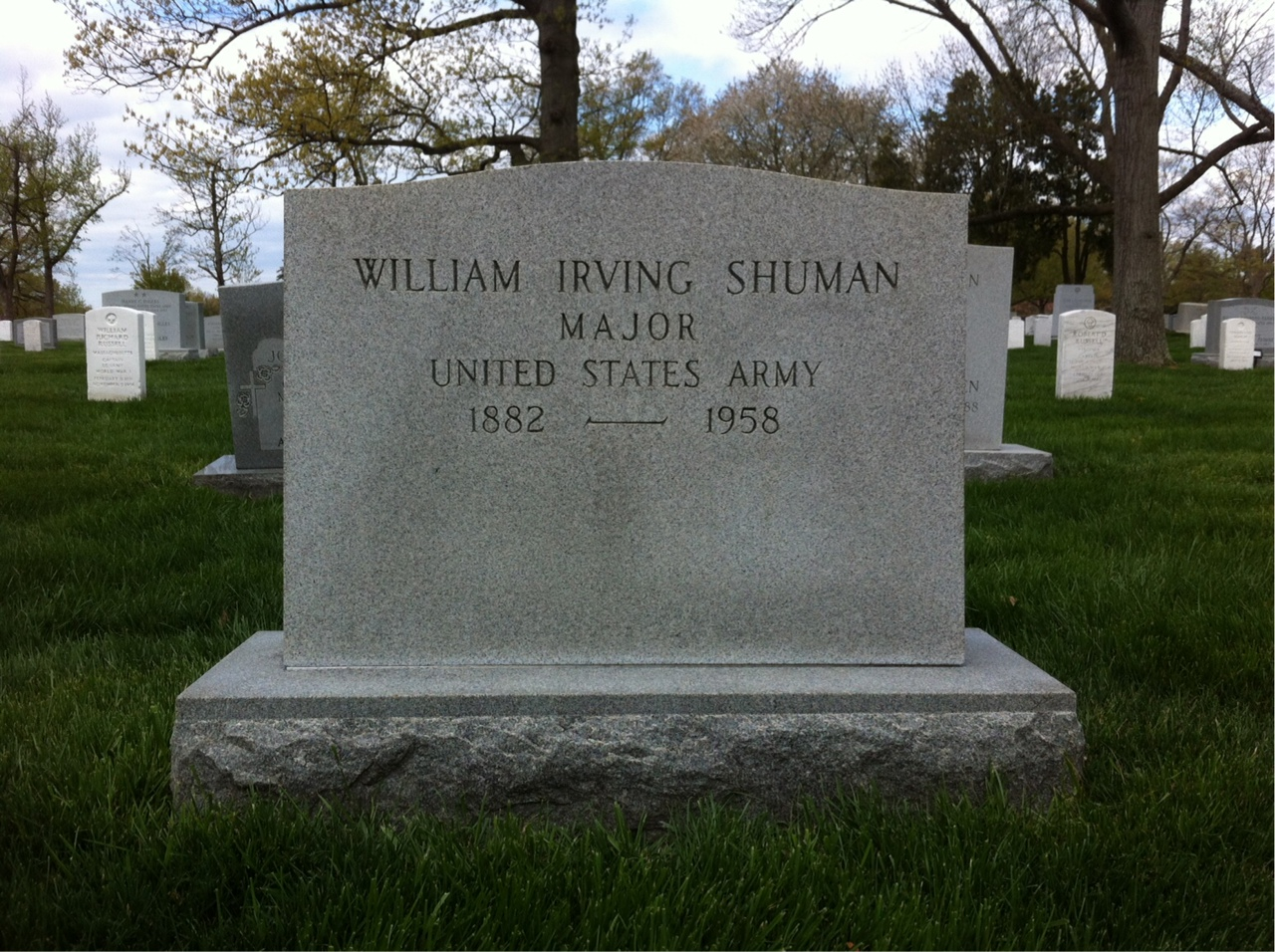
- Grave at Arlington National Cemetery
- Born: William Irving Shuman; September 18, 1882; Sullivan, Illinois, United States
- Died: December 1, 1958 (aged 76)
- Other name: Irving Shuman
- Occupations: Businessman, banker and political activist
- Political party: Democratic Party
- Spouse: Pearl Thomason (m. 1903)
- Children: Mary Elizabeth Shuman, daughter Maybelle Shuman, daughter
- Parent(s): Charles and Mary Richardson (McPheeters) Shuman
- Relatives: Isaac Bowman, great-grandfather

William Irving Shuman (1882–1958) was an American businessman, banker and political activist during the late 19th and early 20th century. A longtime member of the Democratic Party in Moultrie County, Illinois, he was an Illinois delegate to the 1912 Democratic National Convention and served as assistant U.S. Treasurer in Chicago, Illinois during World War I.

== Biography ==
Shuman was born to Charles and Mary Richardson (McPheeters) Shuman, in Sullivan, Illinois. He left high school at age 16 and was almost immediately taken on at the State Bank of Sullivan, where he worked his way from bank teller, assistant cashier and finally to head cashier within five years. After two years, the 23-year-old Shuman was elected director becoming one of the youngest banking officials in the United States. He was also elected as director of the Sullivan Elevator Company, one of the largest grain concerns in central Illinois, as well as the president of Group Seven of the Illinois Banking Association from 1911 to 1912. The organization represented Sangamon, Macon, Christian, Shelby, Montgomery, Macoupin and Moultrie counties. At the end of his term, he was unanimously elected as a member of the Council of the Illinois Bankers' Association for a three-year term.

He was also appointed to the State Bankers' Committee on Agricultural and Vocational Education and, two years later, he became assistant U.S. Treasurer on October 13, 1913. He remained in this position throughout the First World War, Shuman's early duties being to coordinate with Chicago banking officials in expediting the first issue of Aldrich-Vreeland currency and supervise the distribution of $25 million from the Chicago sub-treasury. He was also chosen by U.S. Secretary of the Treasury William Gibbs McAdoo to co-operate with banking officials of the newly built Federal Reserve Bank of Chicago. Shuman placed the bank in a working basis and later received acclaim by governors and assistants for his assistance.

Prior to his appointment, he had become active in politics as a somewhat militant Progressive Democrat. In 1910, he became interested in Woodrow Wilson as a possible presidential candidate and, at the behest of McCombs, he assisted in campaigning for Wilson in Illinois and the Midwest during the presidential election the following year. He was given complete control over the downstate Illinois campaign as well as being involved in the primaries in South Dakota and special work in Minnesota, Michigan and Indiana. Later elected as a member of the 19th Congressional District in Baltimore, Maryland, Shuman is credited as being one of those whose influence switched the Illinois delegation to support Wilson in the Baltimore convention.

After Wilson's successful election as President of the United States, he returned to his former position with the Sullivan Elevator Company becoming treasurer and director, a director of the Citizens' Abstract Company and the First National Bank in Wheaton, Illinois. He also became a member of the Sons of the American Revolution, being the great-grandson of Isaac Bowman, as well as a member of the Union League, the Iroquois Club, Chicago Press Club, and Railway and Manufacturers' Club. He was also a 32nd degree Freemason and one of the officers of the Grand Royal Arch chapter.

Following his death in 1958, he was buried in Arlington National Cemetery in Arlington, Virginia.
