= Joseph Bowman =

American militia officer (1752–1779)

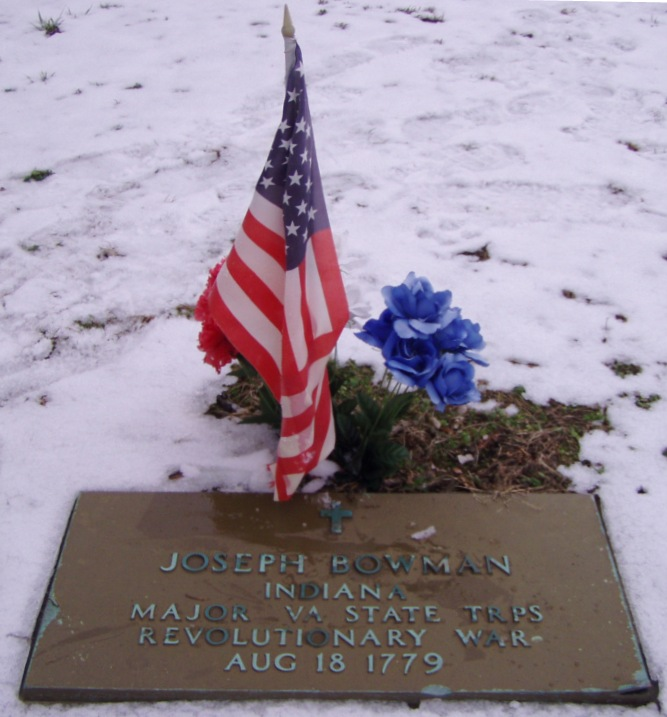
- Joseph Bowman grave marker, at St. Francis Xavier Cathedral Cemetery, near George Rogers Clark National Historical Park, Vincennes, Indiana
- Born: Joseph Lawrence Bowman c. March 8, 1752 March 8, 1752; Frederick County, Virginia
- Died: August 15, 1779 (aged 27); Fort Patrick Henry
- Cause of death: burn wounds from gunpowder explosion
- Resting place: St. Francis Xavier Cathedral Cemetery, near George Rogers Clark National Historical Park
- Occupations: frontiersman, hunter, farmer, soldier, state militia officer
- Parent(s): George Bowman and Mary Hite, Anglicized from Hans Georg Baumann and Marie Elisabetha Hite
Relatives
Jost Hite (grandfather)
Jacob Bowman (brother)
John Bowman (brother)
Isaac Bowman (brother)
Abraham Bowman (brother)
Joseph Bowman
- Military career
- Allegiance: United States
- Branch: Virginia Militia
- Service years: 1774, 1778-1779
- Rank: Major
- Conflicts: Lord Dunmore's War; American Revolutionary War: Illinois Campaign

Joseph Lawrence Bowman (c. 1752 – 15 August 1779) was an American frontiersmen and military officer who fought during the American Revolutionary War. He was second-in-command during Colonel George Rogers Clark's 1778 military campaign to capture the Illinois Country, in which Clark and his men seized the key British-controlled towns of Kaskaskia, Cahokia, and Vincennes. Following the campaign, Bowman was critically injured in an accidental gunpowder explosion and subsequently died of his wounds. He was the only American officer killed during the 1778-1779 Illinois campaign. Joseph Bowman kept a daily journal of his trek from Kaskaskia to Vincennes, which is one of the best primary source accounts of Clark's victorious campaign.

== Early life ==
Joseph Bowman was born in Frederick County, Virginia, the son of George Bowman and Mary Hite. Their names were Anglicized from their original German names, Hans Georg Baumann and Marie Elisabetha Hite. His maternal grandfather was Jost Hite, a German immigrant credited as the first white, European colonist to settle west of the Blue Ridge Mountains of Virginia. In 1732, Hite led his extended family, including his daughter Mary and her husband, George Bowman, to the Shenandoah Valley, near present-day Winchester, Frederick County, Virginia. Jost Hite distributed land that he owned to his family and to other settlers—claims, which would later be contested in Hite v. Fairfax, a landmark Virginia land case.

In 1774, Joseph Bowman served in the Virginia colonial militia during Lord Dunmore's War. Other Virginians, who served with him in the war, included George Rogers Clark and Leonard Helm. A year later, Bowman moved to Kentucky with other Anglo-American colonists who were seeking available land on the western frontier. In 1776, Bowman was among the petitioners in Harrodsburg, Kentucky seeking to establish a new county. On September 11, 1777, thirty-seven men from the area gathered at Bowman's property to shell corn and were attacked by Indians. One white settler was killed and six others were wounded before the Indians were driven off.

== Revolutionary War service ==
Joseph Bowman and three of his brothers served in the American Revolutionary War. Bowman is sometimes confused with his brother, Colonel John Bowman, a prominent leader of the Kentucky frontier settlements of the Virginia State Forces during the war.

In early 1778, Colonel George Rogers Clark offered Bowman a commission if he could raise his own company. Captain Bowman assembled his company and joined the rest of Clark's force on 12 May 1778, and was part of Clark's campaign. Bowman was present at the capture of Fort Gage in Kaskaskia, on 4 July 1778. Bowman later moved north, leading a non-uniformed, combined force of Virginian, local Illinois Country, and French-Canadian's to capture Prairie du Rocher and Cahokia Fort de Chartres and Cahokia, where Bowman remained for a time as the commanding officer of the renamed Fort Bowman.

When Fort Sackville (Vincennes), renamed Fort Patrick Henry and Captain Leonard Helm, was captured by British Lt-Governor Henry "Hair Buyer" Hamilton in late 1778, Captain Bowman marched with Colonel Clark in February 1779 across 180 miles (290 km) to lay siege to the British outpost at Vincennes. Bowman also participated in the negotiations for their surrender. After the surrender, the American flag was raised and the fort was renamed Fort Patrick Henry, on February 24, 1779. Within days, a dispatch from the Governor of Virginia arrived, with commissions promoting Clark to general, and Bowman to major. For his services rendered, Major Bowman was granted a total of 4,312 acres (17.45 km^{2}) in land north of the Ohio River, known as "Clark's Grant."

== Death ==
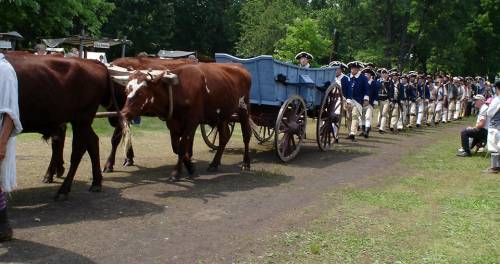
Major Joseph Bowman's funeral and funeral procession were recreated at the 2006 Spirit of Vincennes Rendezvous

In celebration of the end of General Clark's Illinois campaign, a six-pounder cannon was fired on February 25, 1779. During the cannon salute, some of the artillery gunpowder charges accidentally ignited, wounding Captain Edward Worthington, four American privates, a British prisoner of war, and critically wounding Captain Bowman. Oddly enough, General Clark made no mention of the tragic cannon accident in his memoir, however, Clark does describe Major Bowman leading soldiers, as late as June 1779. Due to the severe burn wounds he received, the health of Major Bowman deteriorated, causing him to die at Fort Patrick Henry on 14 August 1779. The last page of his journal is blank, except for an anonymous notation: "God save the [Virginia] commonwealth, this 15th day of August, 1779." A bronze grave marker with the date of 18 August 1779 was later, placed in the St. Francis Xavier Cemetery, adjacent to the George Rogers Clark National Historical Park, Vincennes, Knox County, Indiana, though he was buried somewhere along the Wabash River.
