= Jacob Bowman =

American pioneer (1733–1781)

Captain Johannes (John) Jacob Bowman, Sr., (December 2, 1733 - June 20, 1781) was an 18th-century American pioneer, grandson of Jost Hite, Colonial Militia officer of Virginia Colony, veteran of the French and Indian War, City of Strasburg Trustee, large land owner in Virginia and South Carolina, a South Carolina State Representative (Third Whig), District 96 Road Commissioner and Revolutionary War Patriot noted for supplying mill goods to the Continental Army. In 1753 he helped his father in the construction of Ft. Bowman (aka Harmony Hall) near present-day Strasburg, Virginia.

Four of his younger brothers, Col. John (aka Johannes) (John Bowman (pioneer)), Col. Abraham, Maj. Joseph and Capt. Isaac Bowman were excellent horsemen and later known in John Wayland's book as the "Four Centaurs of Cedar Creek", and all of whom were among the earliest pioneers to settle in Kentucky and serve as prominent officers in the Continental Army. While his younger brothers were in Kentucky, Jacob Bowman and brother-in-law George Wright had earlier removed to the old 96th District in the Province of South Carolina where he owned a grist mill and trading post on the Reedy River.

He was also the brother-in-law of frontiersmen Isaac Ruddell, Lorentz Stephens, Peter Deyerle, Henry Richardson, George Brinker and the aforementioned George Wright. A future great-grandson, Abram Hite Bowman. in 1919 would found Kentucky's first airport, Bowman Field, which is the oldest continually operating airport in North America. His grandnephew, Col. Abraham's grandson John Bryan Bowman, founded the University of Kentucky and the Agricultural and Mechanical College of Kentucky.

== Early life ==
Born in the Shenandoah Valley of what was then the Virginia Colony to pioneer George Bowman and Mary Hite (daughter of pioneer Jost Hite) on Cedar Creek in what was then Spotsylvania, later Shenandoah County, Virginia he is first recorded as having fought in the French and Indian War (1754-1763), as a Captain in the Virginia militia in 1758. He lived in Botetourt County. In November 1761, (John) Jacob served as a Trustee for the City of Strasburg.

By marrying Sarah Stephens in 1766, (John) Jacob married his young step-niece, the daughter of Lawrence Stephens and a step-daughter of (John) Jacob's sister Mary (Bowman) Stephens. Between August 1766 and March 1768, his brother-in-law George Wright and sister Sarah (Bowman) Wright talk (John) Jacob and Sarah Stephens Bowman into moving to the Carolinas where George Wright and he had visited family in 1764.

== South Carolina ==
Within a year after his father's death in March 1768, Jacob Bowman sold his remaining real estate, including 500 acres on Linville Creek and his part of the Cedar Creek Estate which he inherited from his father, and finally settled next to the Wrights on the Reedy River, Laurens County, Province of South Carolina near Greenville where he built a mill and trading post. Here the Bowmans raised seven children: (John) Jacob, Jr., Mary, John, Rebecca, Sarah, Nancy and George. The Bowmans: A Pioneering Family in Virginia, Kentucky and the Northwest Territory. (Staunton, Virginia: McClure Co., 1943).

In 1776 (John) Jacob would have been 43 years of age and 50 when the American Revolutionary War ended in 1783. During the war he took a leading role in the new colonial government and in November 1778, (John) Jacob was elected to the South Carolina Legislature as a state Representative for the Ninety-Six District. He was a member of the Third South Carolina Whig General Assembly and was later recognized for his civil and private service to the people of South Carolina.

In June 1781, (John) Jacob was shot in the doorway to his mill by Indians (or Tories dressed as Indians; this point is unclear). His widow filed for administration of the estate on October 2, 1782 in the Ninety-Six District as Sarah 'Stephens' Bowman of Reedy River.

== Clearing the record ==
There are conflicting accounts of Jacob Bowman's loyalties and death. One says he was killed at the Battle of Ramsour's Mill in North Carolina on June 20, 1780. Although a Captain John Bowman was mortally wounded in that battle, it has been asserted that this was not the same (John) Jacob Bowman. He was not the husband Grace Grizel Greenlee, as had been stated. Grace did marry a John Bowman but again she did not marry (John) Jacob Bowman. A third link would be the confusion that exists between him and his own brother: 1738 Colonel John Bowman (aka Johannes). With somewhat similar adult names, one has to remember that their lives after 1768 were spent in two different locales. (John) Jacob was in the Province of South Carolina while Colonel John was in the area of what would become the state of Kentucky.

== Late court case discovery ==
Records of an 1840-1842 Mercer County court case brought Bowman's Tory sympathies into question. The case was brought by Pendleton and wife Sarah (Dunklin) Thomas (ostenisbly a granddaughter of (John) Jacob and Sarah (Stephens) Bowman) who brought suit against her Uncle George for the wrongful distribution of Sarah (Stephens) Bowman's estate. These court records were deemed to fully established a true death date, the names of (John) Jacob and Sarah (Stephens) Bowman's children and a record of supplying goods and materials to the Continental Army. These findings gained them acceptance as DAR Patriots in 1995. (Ref. Pendleton Thomas and wife vs George Bowman, Mercer County Circuit Court, yrs 1840, 1841 & 1842, File Box #39.) As of 2024, however, the DAR states that future applicants must prove Bowman's patriotic service and lists him as serving in the Tory militia in 1775 and 1780.
