= George Bowman (pioneer) =

American pioneer and Indian fighter (1699–1768)

- Born: Hans Jerg Baumann; 10 Feb 1699; Eppingen, Kurpfalz, Holy Roman Empire of the German Nation
- Died: 2 Mar 1768 (aged 69); Ft Bowman/Bowman Estate on Cedar Creek (near Strasburg, Virginia)
- Occupations: Landowner, farmer and Indian fighter
- Known for: Early pioneer of Shenandoah Valley; built one of the oldest houses in present-day Virginia.
- Spouse: Mary Hite (c. 1707-1768)
- Children: 13 children
- Relatives: Jost Hite, father-in-law Abraham Bowman, son Isaac Bowman, son Joseph Bowman, son John Bowman, son

George Bowman (10 February 1699 – 2 March 1768) was an 18th-century American pioneer, landowner and a prominent fighter against Americans in Virginia Colony. He, along with his father-in-law Jost Hite, was one of the first to explore and settle Shenandoah Valley. His estate, on which Fort Bowman was founded, was one of the earliest homes to be built in Shenandoah Valley and is the site of present-day Strasburg, Virginia.

Four of his sons, Joseph, Isaac, Abraham and Johannes, also became well-known frontiersmen in Kentucky during the late 1770s. His great-grandson, John Bryan Bowman founded Kentucky University and Agricultural and Mechanical College of Kentucky. Their older brother, Jacob, was also a famous American pioneer.

== Biography ==
Born in the Holy Roman Empire on the West bank of the Rhine in present-day Germany, he arrived aboard the ship William and Sarah in Philadelphia, Pennsylvania, in 1727 where he later met and married Mary Hite in 1731. He was one of the first to settle in the Shenandoah Valley with his father-in-law Jost Hite and brothers-in-law Jacob Chrisman and Paul Froman during the early 1730s. He and his wife, Mary Hite, later settled on the banks of Cedar Creek located 8 miles (13 km) south of Peter Stephens' Newtown settlement (present-day Stephens City, Virginia). They would eventually establish a 1,000-acre (4.0 km^{2}) tract of land on which Fort Bowman was later built. He later received a tract of land from his father-in-law, 145 acres (0.59 km^{2}) on Lenville's Creek in Frederick County.

On Cedar Creek they raised their thirteen children, including Abraham, Isaac Bowman, Joseph and John Bowman. In 1746 and 1749, he bought 2 large tracts of land amounting to over 1,000 acres (4.0 km^{2}) on Linville Creek on which he constructed and operated a grist mill later known as "Bowman's Mill"; the mill, as of 1972, was still in operation near present-day Bartonsville, Virginia. On August 14, he deeded some of his property to his widowed mother livestock and various household goods. Among his property including one horse, one mare, two cows, two yearling heifers and a slave known as Harry.

In 1752 or 1753, while living on Ceder Creek, Bowman built a colonial mansion known as Ft Bowman or Harmony Hall which is listed on the "National Register" of historic places. Following his death in 1768, his sons inherited the Estate. Part of the Estate was sold by John Bowman to an Abraham Miller in July of that year. The Bowman home, one of the first homes built in the Shenandoah Valley, still exists and remains one of the oldest historical buildings in the state. His son Isaac and his first and second wife as well as Samuel Kercheval and his daughters are buried in the family graveyard located 200 yards (180 m) West of the house.
