= Illinois campaign =

1778–79 series of engagements during the American Revolutionary War

- Part of the American Revolutionary War
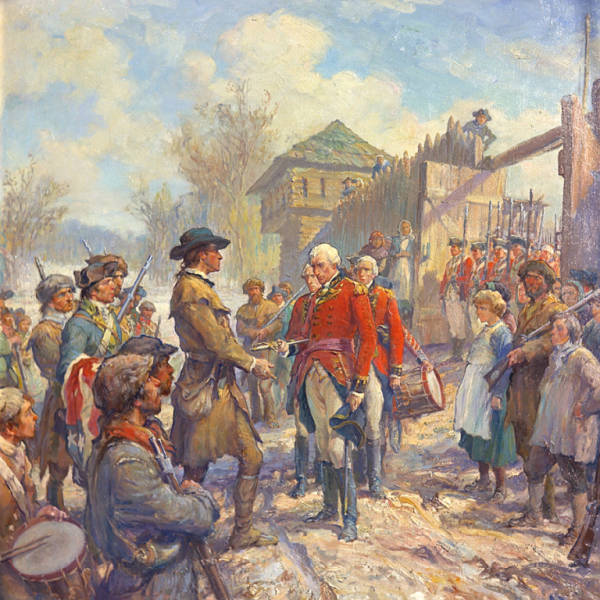
- The Fall of Fort Sackville by Frederick C. Yohn, 1923
Date	July 1778 – February 1779
Location	Midwestern United States
Result	American victory
Territorial changes	Creation of Illinois County, Virginia

Belligerents
United States	Great Britain; Odawa

Commanders and leaders
George Rogers Clark; Joseph Bowman; Leonard Helm	Henry Hamilton (surrendered); Rocheblave (surrendered); Egushawa

The Illinois campaign, also known as Clark's Northwestern campaign, was a series of engagements during the American Revolutionary War in which a small force of Virginia militia led by George Rogers Clark seized control of several British outposts in the region northwest of the Ohio River in what is now Illinois and Indiana. The campaign is the best-known action of the western theater of the war and the source of Clark's reputation as an early American military hero.

In July 1778, Clark and his men descended the Ohio River from the Falls of the Ohio, crossed overland to the Mississippi River and took control of Kaskaskia, Cahokia, and several other villages in British territory. Vincennes, on the Wabash River was occupied a few weeks later. The occupation was accomplished without firing a shot because many of the French-speaking inhabitants of the region were sympathetic to the Patriot cause. To counter Clark's advance, Henry Hamilton, the British lieutenant-governor based at Fort Detroit, reoccupied Vincennes with a small force in December 1778. In February 1779, Clark returned to Vincennes in a surprise winter expedition and retook the town, capturing Hamilton in the process. Virginia capitalized on Clark's success by establishing the region as Illinois County. The importance of the Illinois campaign has been the subject of much debate. Because the British ceded the entire area northwest of the Ohio River to the United States in the 1783 Treaty of Paris, some historians have credited Clark's actions with nearly doubling the size of the original Thirteen Colonies. For this reason, Clark was acclaimed "Conqueror of the Northwest", and his Illinois campaign—particularly his surprise march on Vincennes—was greatly celebrated and romanticized.

== Background ==
The Illinois Country was a vaguely defined region northwest of the Ohio River which included much of what is now the states of Indiana and Illinois. The area had been a part of the Louisiana district of New France until the end of the French and Indian War when France ceded sovereignty of the region east of the Mississippi to the British in the 1763 Treaty of Paris. In the Quebec Act of 1774, the British officially made the Illinois Country part of the Province of Quebec.

In 1778, the population of the Illinois Country consisted of less than 1,000 people of European descent, mostly French-speaking, and about 600 African-American slaves. Thousands of Native Americans lived in villages concentrated along the Mississippi, Illinois, and Wabash Rivers. British official military presence in the region had been nonexistent after the 70 soldiers based at Kaskaskia's Fort Gage had been ordered east during the 1775 Invasion of Quebec. When the soldiers departed, Philippe-François de Rastel, Sieur de Rocheblave, a resident trader and former French officer, was authorized to administer Kaskaskia. Rocheblave, however, lacked the money, resources, and men needed to administer and protect the settlements in the region.

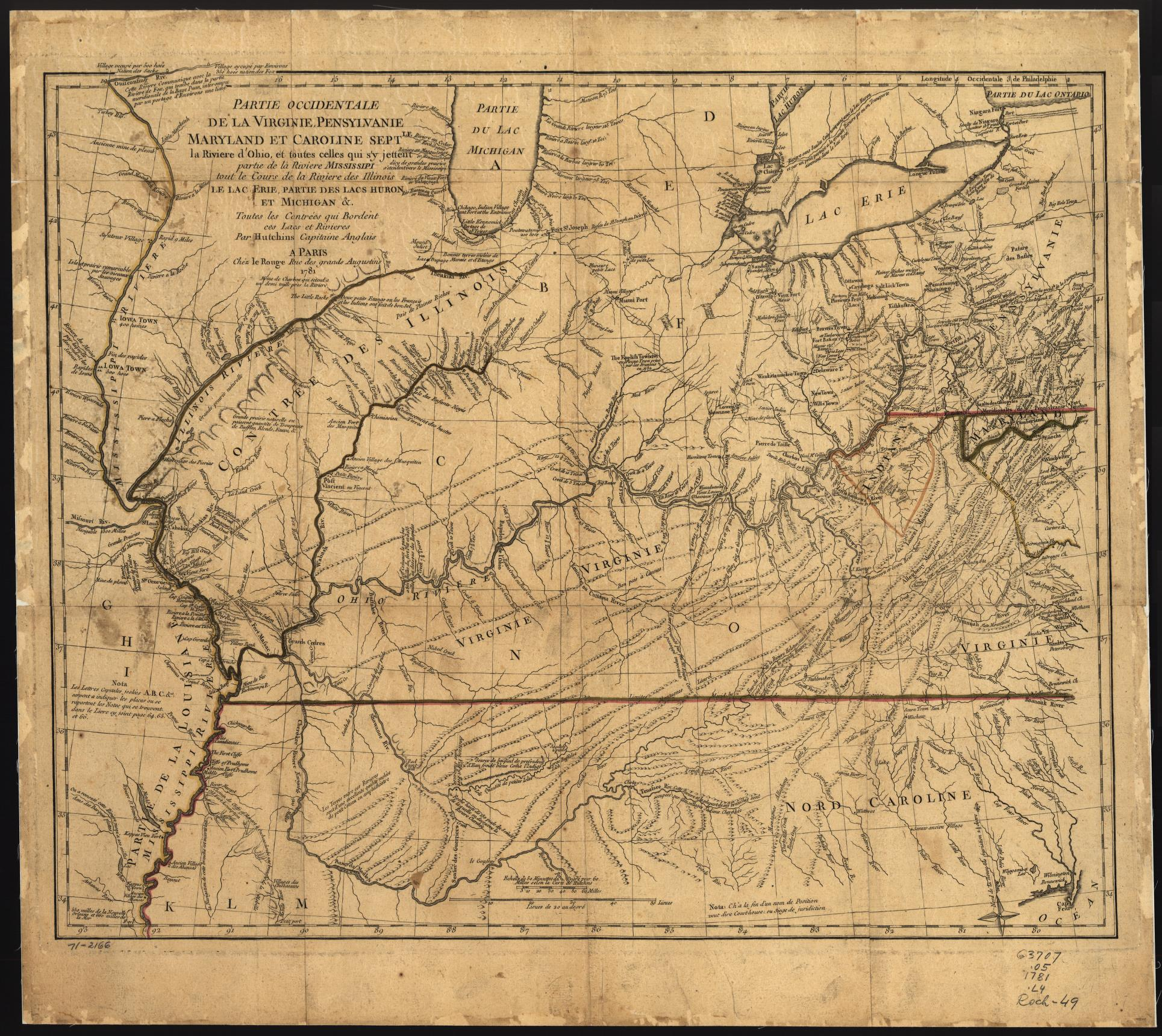
French translation of Thomas Hutchins' 1778 map showing the Illinois Country, Ohio River, Wabash River, and Mississippi River.

During the Revolutionary War, the Ohio River marked the border between the Illinois Country and Kentucky, which was then a newly settled area claimed by Virginia. The British originally sought to keep Native Americans out of the war, but in 1777, Lieutenant Governor Hamilton received instructions to recruit and arm Indigenous war parties to raid frontier settlements. These war parties were to be accompanied by British Indian Department officers or volunteers from the Detroit militia so as to prevent atrocities. "From 1777 on," wrote historian Bernard Sheehan, "the line of western settlements was under almost constant assault by white-led raiding parties that had originated at Detroit."

In 1777, George Rogers Clark was a 25-year-old major in the Kentucky County, Virginia, militia. Clark believed that he could end the raids on Kentucky by capturing the British posts in the Illinois Country and then moving against Detroit. In April 1777, Clark sent two spies to Kaskaskia. They returned two months later and reported that the fort at Kaskaskia was unguarded, that the French-speaking residents were not greatly attached to the British, and that no one expected an attack. Clark immediately wrote a letter to Governor Patrick Henry of Virginia in which he outlined a plan to capture Kaskaskia.

== Planning ==
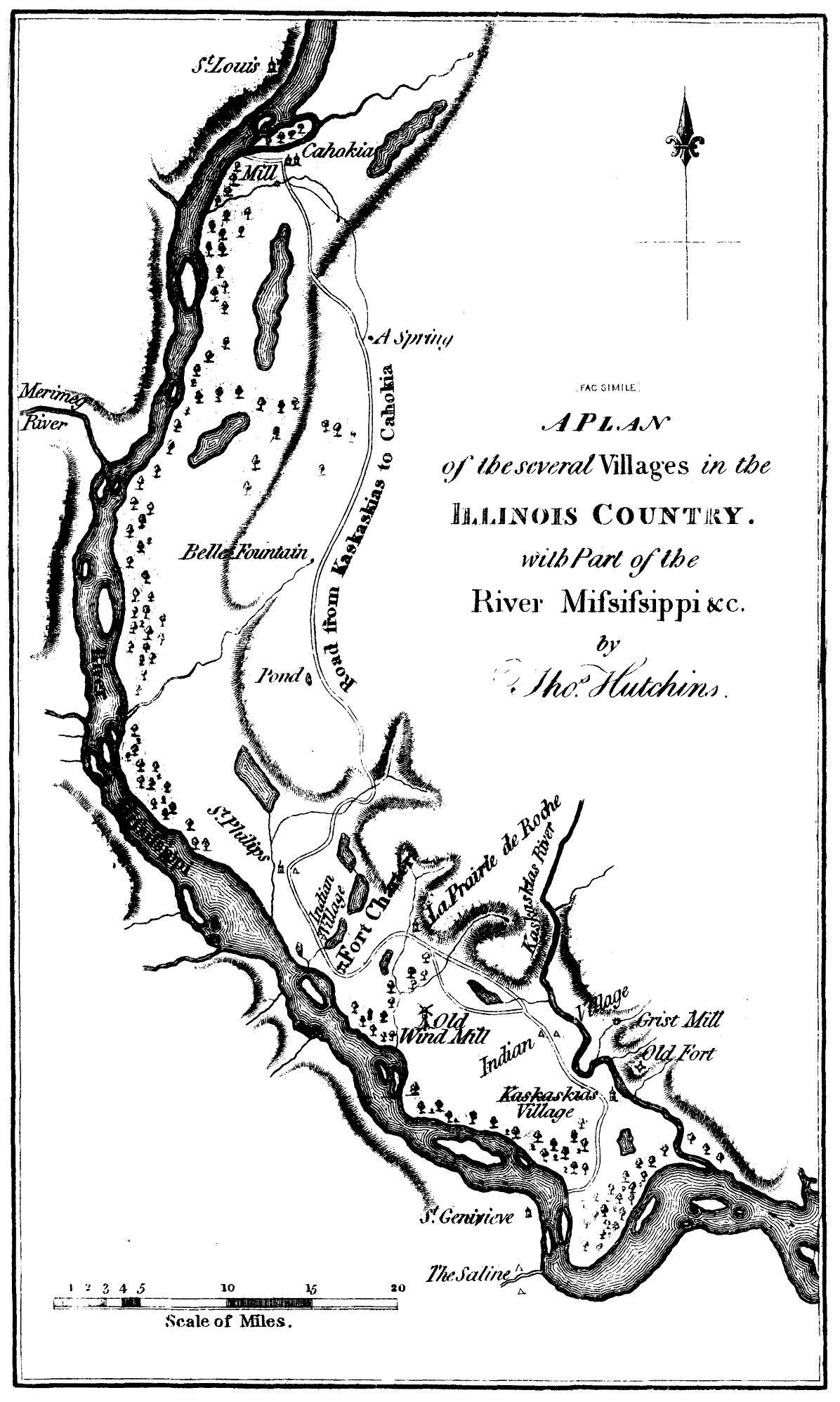
French colonial settlements and forts in the Illinois Country, from the 1778 map by Thomas Hutchins

Because the settlers living in Kentucky lacked the authority, manpower, and supplies to launch the expedition themselves, Clark traveled to Williamsburg in October 1777 via the Wilderness Road to meet with Governor Henry. He was joined by a party of about 100 who were leaving Kentucky due to Indigenous raids. Clark presented his plan to Governor Henry on December 10, 1777. To maintain secrecy, Clark's proposal was only shared with a small group of influential Virginians, including Thomas Jefferson, George Mason, and George Wythe. Although Henry initially expressed doubts about whether the campaign was feasible, Clark managed to win the confidence of Henry and the others. The plan was approved by the members of the Virginia General Assembly, who were only given vague details about the expedition. Publicly, Clark was authorized to raise men for the defence of Kentucky. In a secret set of instructions from Governor Henry, Clark was instructed to capture Kaskaskia and then proceed as he saw fit.

Governor Henry commissioned Clark as a lieutenant colonel in the Virginia militia and authorized him to raise seven companies, each to contain fifty men. This unit, later known as the Illinois Regiment, was a part of Virginia's state forces and not a part of the Continental Army. The men were enlisted to serve for three months, once they reached Kentucky. To maintain secrecy, Clark did not tell any of his recruits that the purpose of the expedition was to invade the Illinois Country. Clark was given £1,200 in Continental currency to purchase supplies.

Clark established his headquarters at Redstone Old Fort on the Monongahela River, while three of Clark's associates from Dunmore's War, Joseph Bowman, Leonard Helm and William Harrod, began recruitment efforts. Clark commissioned Captain William Bailey Smith as a major, and gave him £150 to recruit four companies in the Holston River valley and meet Clark at the Falls of the Ohio.

Clark was unable to raise all 350 men authorized for the Illinois Regiment. His recruiters had to compete with recruiters from the Continental Army and from other militia units. Some believed that Kentucky was too sparsely inhabited to warrant the diversion of manpower, and recommended that it should be evacuated rather than defended. Settlers in the Holston valley were more concerned with the Cherokee to the south than with the Indigenous tribes north of the Ohio. A longstanding boundary dispute between Pennsylvania and Virginia meant that few Pennsylvanians volunteered for what was perceived as a campaign to protect Virginia territory, although some did enlist.

== Clark's journey down the Ohio ==
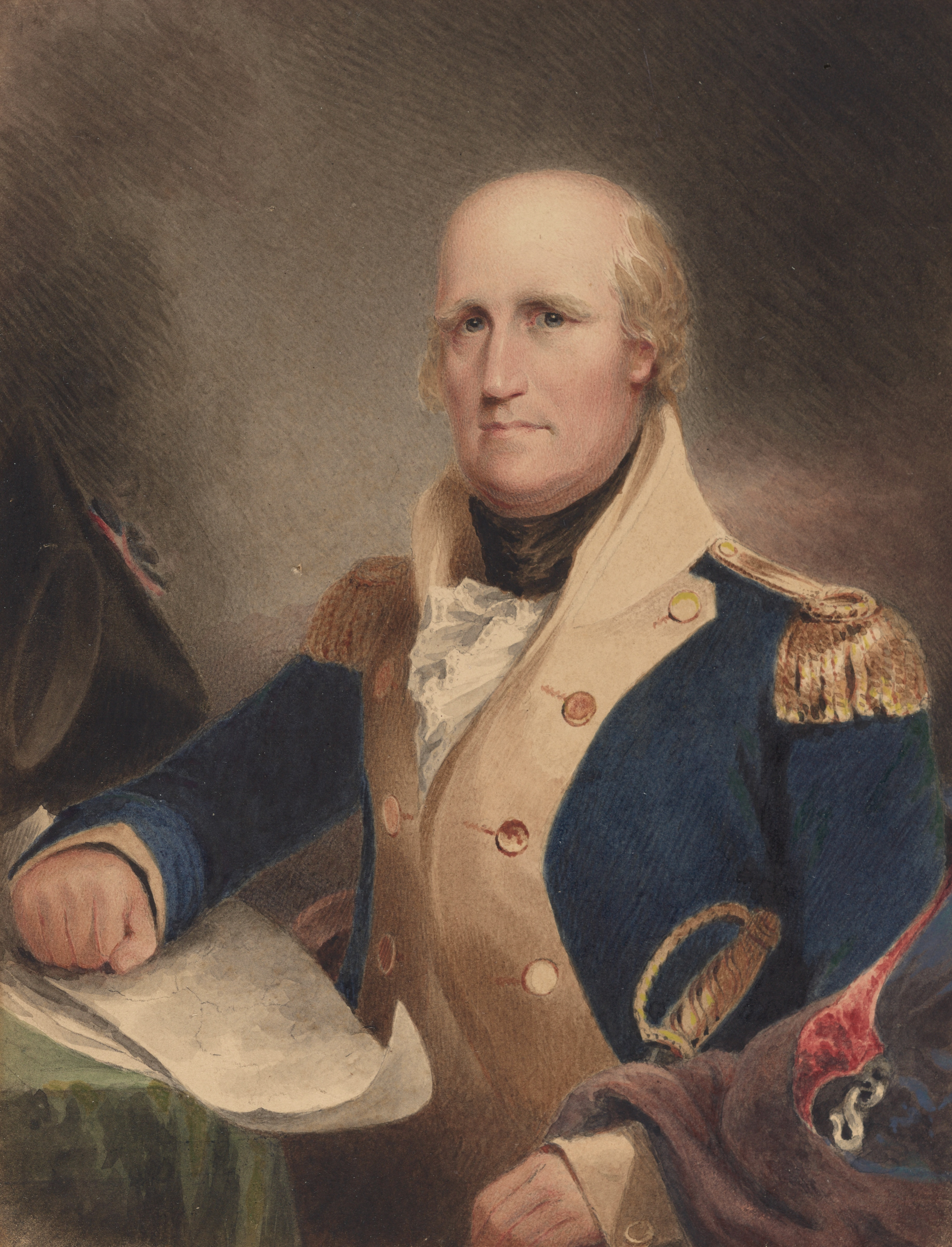
No authentic portraits from life of George Rogers Clark were made during the Revolutionary era. This portrait of an older Clark was painted by Matthew Harris Jouett in 1825, after the death of Clark.

After repeated delays to allow time for more men to join, Clark left Redstone by boat on May 12, 1778, with about 150 recruits, organized in three companies under captains Bowman, Helm, and Harrod. Clark expected to rendezvous with 200 Holston men under Major Smith at the Falls of the Ohio. Traveling with Clark were about 20 families who were going to Kentucky to settle.

Clark and his men picked up additional supplies at Fort Pitt and at Henry that were provided by Brigadier General Edward Hand, the Continental Army Western Department commander. They reached Fort Randolph soon after it had been besieged by an Indigenous war party. The fort commander asked for assistance in pursuing the raiders, but Clark declined, believing that he could not spare the time.

Clark stopped at the mouth of the Kentucky River and despatched a message upriver to Major Smith, telling him that it was time to rendezvous. Clark soon learned, however, that of Smith's four promised companies, only one partial company under a Captain Dillard had been raised. Clark therefore sent word to Colonel John Bowman, the senior militia officer in Kentucky, requesting that the colonel send Dillard's men and any other recruits he could find to the Falls of the Ohio.

Clark's flotilla reached the Falls on May 27. He set up a base camp on a small island in the midst of the rapids, later known as Corn Island. When the additional recruits from Kentucky finally arrived, Clark added 20 of these men to his force, placing them in a company under Captain John Montgomery, and sent the others back to help defend the Kentucky settlements. Clark then revealed to his men that the real purpose of the expedition was to invade the Illinois Country. The news was greeted with enthusiasm by many, but some of the Holston men deserted that night; seven or eight were caught and brought back, but others eluded capture and returned to their homes.

While Clark and his officers drilled the troops in preparation for the Kaskaskia expedition, the families who had traveled with the regiment down the Ohio River settled on the island and planted corn. These settlers moved to the mainland the following year, founding the settlement which later became Louisville. While on the island, Clark received an important message from Pittsburgh: France had signed a Treaty of Alliance with the United States. Clark hoped that this information would be useful in securing the allegiance of the French-speaking inhabitants of the Illinois country.

== Occupation of the Illinois Country ==
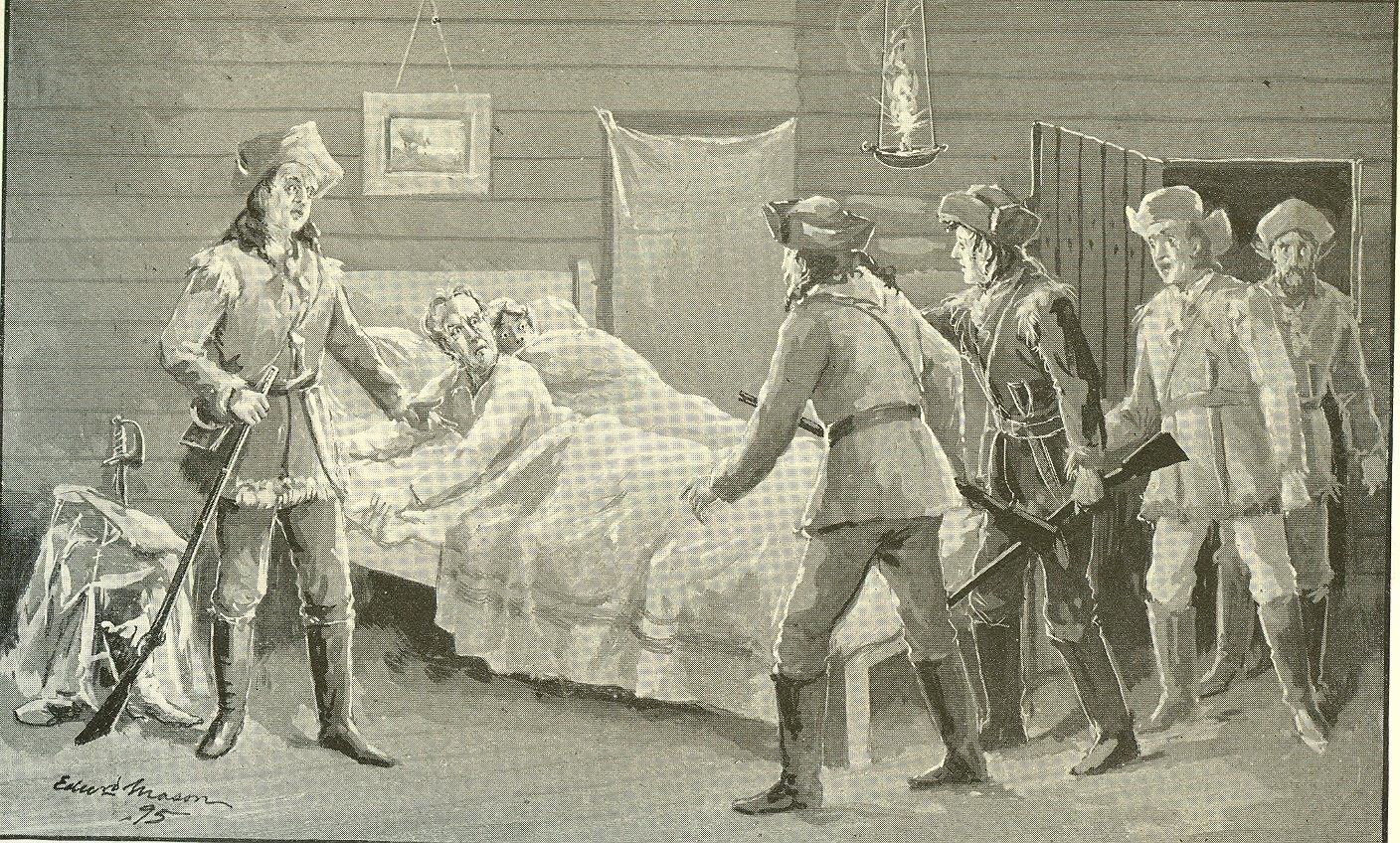
Capture of Rocheblave by Edward Mason,1895

Clark set off from Corn Island on June 24, 1778. The date of departure is sometimes given as June 26, based on a letter Clark wrote to George Mason, but Clark corrected the date in his memoir, since they left the same day as a solar eclipse. Clark left behind seven soldiers who were deemed not hardy enough for the journey. These men stayed with the families on the island and guarded the provisions stored there. Clark's force numbered about 175 men in total, organized in four companies under Captains Bowman, Helm, Harrod, and Montgomery.

On June 28, the Illinois Regiment reached the mouth of the Tennessee River. Normally, travellers going to Kaskaskia would continue to the Mississippi River, and then head upstream to the village. Because Clark hoped to take Kaskaskia by surprise, he decided to march his men across what is now the southern tip of Illinois and approach the village by land, a journey of about 120 miles (190 km). Clark's men captured a boatload of American hunters led by John Duff who had recently been at Kaskaskia. They provided Clark with intelligence about the village and agreed to join the expedition as guides. That evening, Clark and his troops landed their vessels on the north side of the Ohio River, near the ruins of Fort Massac, a French outpost abandoned after the French and Indian War.

The men marched 50 miles (80 km) through forest before emerging onto a prairie. When the chief guide announced that he was lost, Clark suspected treachery and threatened to kill the man unless he found the way. The guide regained his bearings, and the trek resumed. They arrived outside Kaskaskia on the night of July 4. Thinking they would have arrived sooner, the men had carried only four days worth of rations so had gone without food for the last two days of the six-day march. "In our hungry condition," wrote Joseph Bowman, "we unanimously determined to take the town or die in the attempt."

They crossed the Kaskaskia River about midnight and quickly secured the town without firing a shot. The Virginians captured Rocheblave, who was asleep in his quarters when the Americans burst into Kaskaskia's unguarded fort. The next morning, Clark began work to secure the allegiance of the townspeople—a task made easier because Clark brought news of the Franco-American alliance. Residents were asked to take oath of loyalty to Virginia and the United States. Father Pierre Gibault, the village priest, was won over after Clark assured him that the Catholic Church would be protected under the laws of Virginia. Rocheblave and several others deemed hostile to the Americans were kept as prisoners and later sent to Virginia.

Clark next extended his authority to the nearby French settlements. On the afternoon of July 5, Captain Bowman was sent with 30 mounted men, along with some citizens of Kaskaskia, to secure Prairie du Rocher, St. Philippe, and Cahokia. The towns offered no resistance, and within 10 days, more than 300 people had taken the American oath of allegiance. When Clark turned his attention to Vincennes, Father Gibault offered to help. On July 14, Gibault and a few companions set out on horseback for Vincennes. There, most of the citizens agreed to take the oath of allegiance. Gibault returned to Clark in early August to report that an American flag now flew over Vincennes's Fort Sackville. Clark dispatched Captain Helm to Vincennes to take command of the dilapidated fort.

== Hamilton retakes Vincennes ==
Lieutenant Governor Hamilton learned of Clark's occupation of Kaskaskia and Vincennes in early August. He decided to personally lead an expedition into the Illinois Country to reestablish British control of the region and prevent Clark from mounting an expedition against Detroit. An advance party led by Captain Normand MacLeod of the Detroit Volunteers set out from Fort Detroit on September. Hamilton set out on October 7 with 40 Detroit Volunteers led by Captain Guillaume LaMothe, 85 militia led by Major Jehu Hay, a small Royal Artillery detachment, and 60 Odawa and Ojibwe warriors led by Egushawa, an influential Odawa war leader. Hamilton was later joined by a 33-man detachment from the 8th Regiment of Foot, and roughly 200 Miami, Potawatomi, and Shawnee warriors accompanied by British Indian Department officers. Hamilton surprised Fort Sackville's small garrison on December 17 and took Captain Helm prisoner. Work began immediately on restoring the fort. Hamilton decided to winter at Vincennes with the British regulars, while most of the militia and Indigenous warriors returned home.

== Clark's trek to Vincennes ==
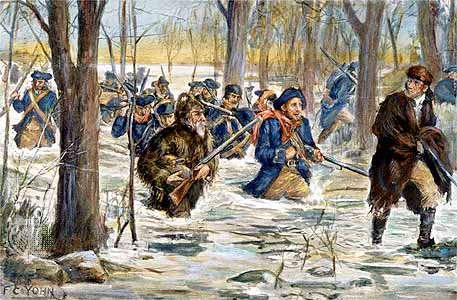
Clark's march to Vincennes has been depicted by many artists. This illustration is by F. C. Yohn.

In late January, Clark learned about Hamilton's reoccupation of Vincennes from Francis Vigo, a fur trader and Spanish subject who had briefly been held prisoner by the British. Clark decided that he needed to launch a surprise winter attack on Vincennes before Hamilton could retake the Illinois country in the spring. He set out for Vincennes on February 6 with 170 men, nearly half of them French militia from Kaskaskia. Captain Bowman was second-in-command on the expedition, which Clark characterized as a "forlorn hope."

Clark led his men across what is now the state of Illinois, a journey of about 180 miles (290 km). The weather was not cold but it rained frequently, and the plains were often covered with several inches of water. Provisions were carried on packhorses, supplemented by wild game. They reached the Little Wabash River on February 13, and found it flooded, making a stream about 5 miles (8.0 km) wide. They built a large canoe to shuttle men and supplies across. They reached the Embarras River on February 17. They were now only 9 miles (14 km) from Fort Sackville, but the river was too high to ford. They followed the Embarras down to the Wabash River, where the next day they began to build boats. Spirits were low: they had been without food for last two days, and Clark struggled to keep men from deserting.

On February 20, a party of hunters from Vincennes were captured while traveling by boat. They told Clark that his little army had not yet been detected, and that the people of Vincennes were still sympathetic to the Americans. The next day, Clark and his men crossed the Wabash by canoe, leaving their packhorses behind. They continued towards Vincennes, sometimes in water up to their shoulders. Shortly before reaching Vincennes, they encountered a villager hunting ducks, who informed Clark that they were still undetected. Clark sent the man with a letter to the inhabitants of Vincennes, warning them that he was just about to arrive with an army, and that everyone should stay in their homes unless they wanted to be considered an enemy. The message was read in the public square. No one went to the fort to warn Hamilton.

== Siege of Fort Sackville ==
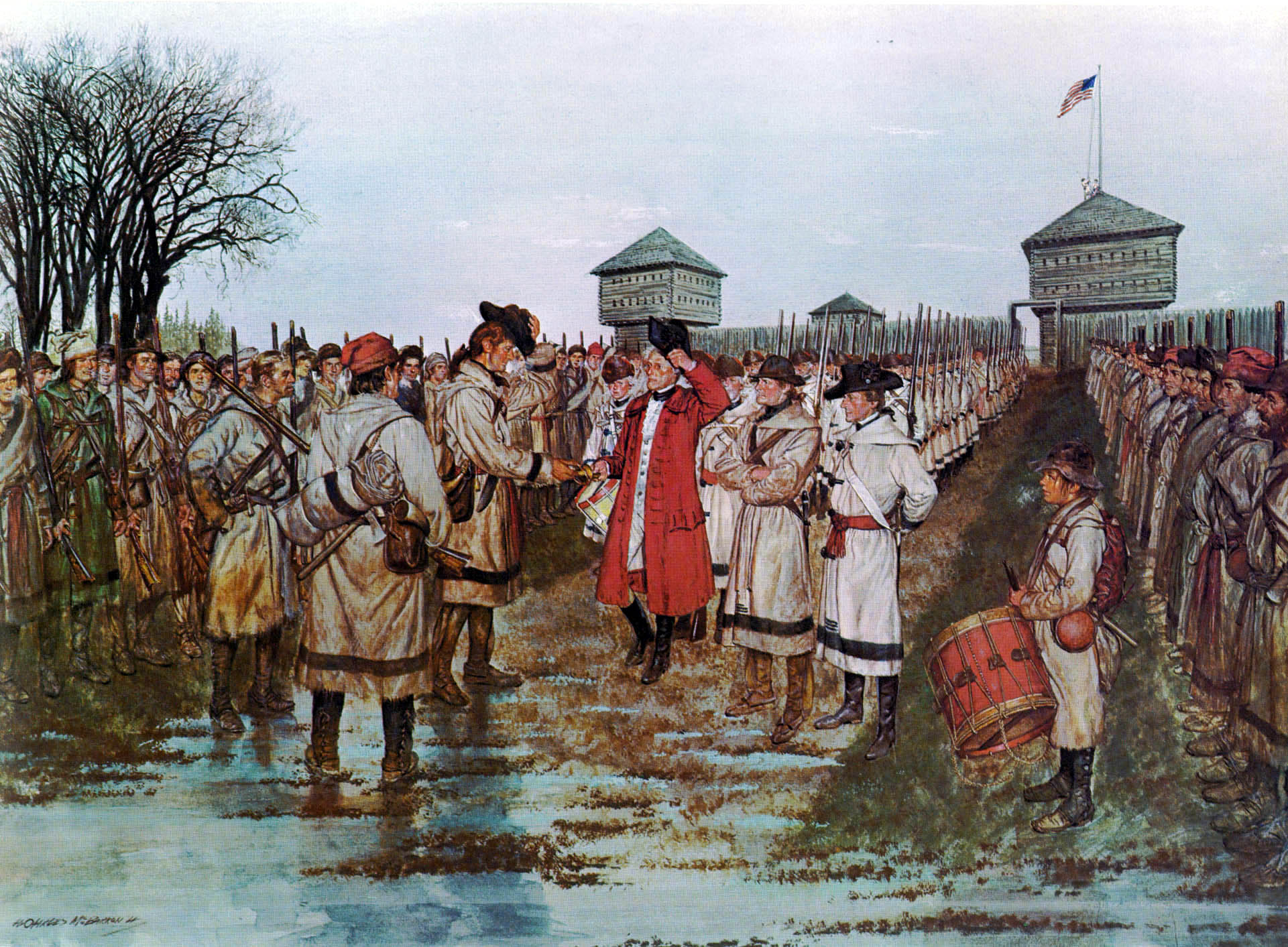
Lieutenant Governor Henry Hamilton surrenders to Lieutenant Colonel George Rogers Clark, February 25, 1779, by H. Charles McBarron.

Clark and his men marched into Vincennes at sunset on February 23, entering the town in two divisions, one commanded by Clark and the other by Bowman. While Clark and Bowman secured the town, a detachment was sent to open fire on Fort Sackville. Hamilton initially believed that the gunfire was caused by a "drunken frolic of the inhabitants" but after a sergeant was slightly wounded realized the fort was under attack and ordered his men to return fire.

While Clark's men fired at the fort throughout the night, small squads crept up to within 30 yards (27 m) of the walls to get a closer shot. The British fired their cannon, damaging a few houses in the village but doing little damage to the besiegers. Clark's men silenced the cannon by firing through the fort's open portholes, killing or wounding some of the gunners. Meanwhile, Clark received local help: villagers gave him powder and ammunition they had hidden from the British. Young Tobacco, a Piankeshaw chief, offered to have his warriors assist in the attack. Clark rejected the offer, likely due to his well-known hatred of Indigenous people.

About mid-morning on February 24, Clark sent a demand for unconditional surrender to Hamilton under a flag of truce. Hamilton was warned that should the fort's supplies or papers be destroyed, he could "expect no mercy, for by Heavens you shall be treated as a Murtherer.” Hamilton initially refused to surrender, but later sent out a letter asking for a three-day truce and a meeting with Clark. Clark repeated his demand for unconditional surrender but did offer to meet Hamilton. Meanwhile, an unsuspecting Odawa scouting party that had set out from Vincennes weeks earlier were ambushed as they returned to the village. Several were killed or wounded and six or seven were taken prisoner. Clark then had four of the prisoners summarily executed within sight of the fort's main gate.

Clark and Hamilton met at the church shortly afterwards. Clark once again demanded unconditional surrender and swore that should he have to storm the fort, "not a single man should be spared." After Hamilton indicated his willingness to fight it out, a compromise was reached wherein the British would "deliver themselves up Prisoners of War and March out with their Arms and Acoutriments." The following morning Hamilton formally surrendered to Clark. A total of 79 men were taken prisoner. Clark ordered the American flag raised over the fort and renamed it Fort Patrick Henry.

Clark sent a detachment upriver on the Wabash, where a British supply convoy was captured, along with a British appointed judge, Philippe DeJean. Clark sent Hamilton, seven of his officers, and 18 other prisoners to Williamsburg. The remainder were paroled and allowed to return to Detroit.

== Aftermath ==
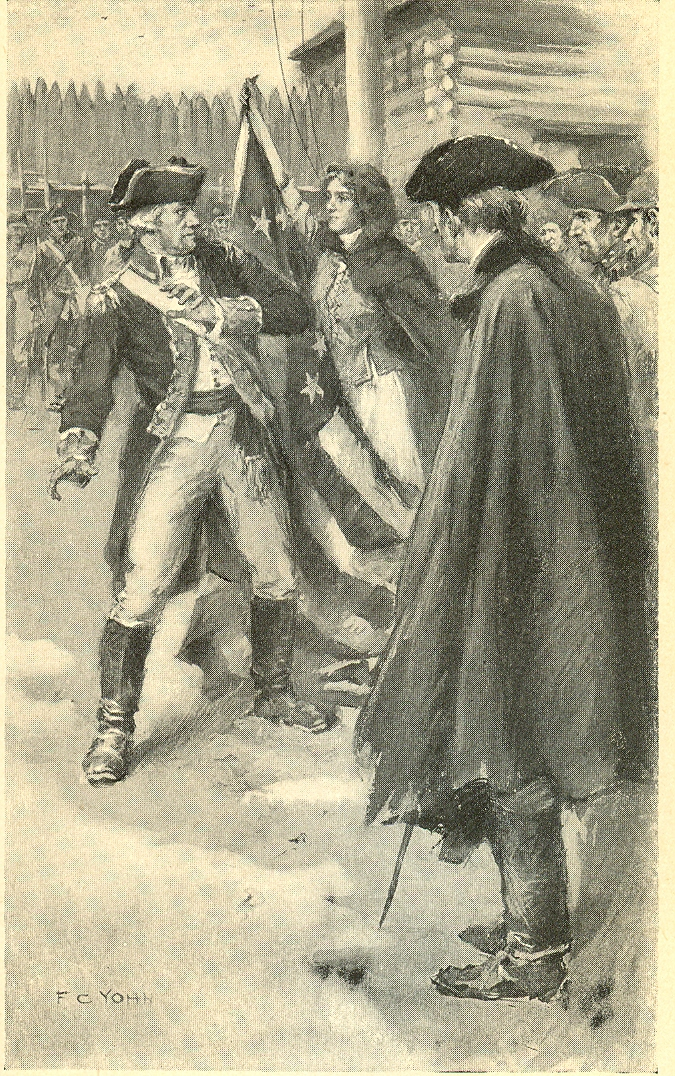
A fictional scene from Alice of Old Vincennes: after Clark has retaken Fort Sackville, Alice, a Canadien inhabitant of Vincennes, triumphantly reveals to Hamilton an American flag she had hidden from the commander.

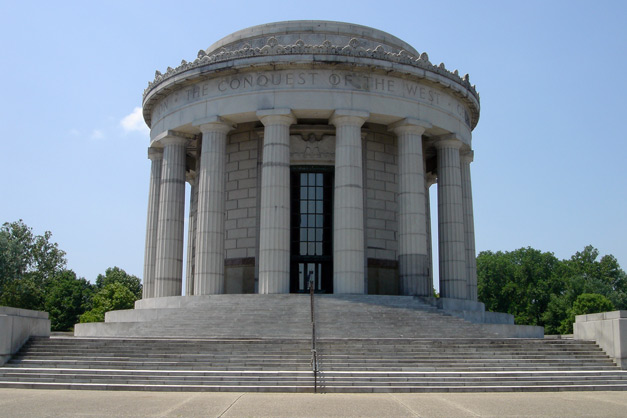
George Rogers Clark National Historical Park marks Clark's victory at Vincennes.

Clark had high hopes after his recapture of Vincennes. "This stroke", he said, "will nearly put an end to the Indian War." In the years that followed, Clark made several attempts to organize a campaign against Detroit, but each time the expedition was called off because of insufficient men and supplies. Meanwhile, settlers began to pour into Kentucky after hearing news of Clark's victory. In 1779, Virginia opened a land office to register claims in Kentucky, and settlements such as Louisville were established.

After learning of Clark's initial occupation of the Illinois Country, Virginia asserted its claim on the region, establishing Illinois County, Virginia in December 1778. In early 1781, Virginia resolved to hand the region over to the federal government, paving the way for the final ratification of the Articles of Confederation. These lands became the Northwest Territory of the United States in 1789.

The Illinois campaign was funded in large part by local residents and merchants of the Illinois country. Although Clark submitted his receipts to Virginia, many of these men were never reimbursed. Some of the major contributors, such as Father Gibault, François Riday Busseron, Charles Gratiot, and Francis Vigo, would never receive payment during their lifetime, and would be reduced to poverty. Clark and his men were awarded land on the north side of the Ohio River across from Louisville. Clark's Grant was centered on what is now Clarksville, Indiana and formed much of what would become Clark and eastern Floyd County, Indiana.

In 1789, Clark wrote an account of the Illinois campaign at the request of John Brown and other members of the United States Congress, who were then deliberating how to administer the Northwest Territory. The Memoir, as it usually known, was not published in Clark's lifetime. Although referred to by historical writers in the 19th century, it was not published in its entirety until 1896 when William Hayden English included it in his Conquest of the Northwest. The Memoir formed the basis of two popular novels: Alice of Old Vincennes (1900) by Maurice Thompson, and The Crossing (1904) by American novelist Winston Churchill. The Illinois campaign was also depicted in Long Knife, a 1979 historical novel by James Alexander Thom. Four United States Navy ship have been named USS Vincennes in honor of Clark's victory.

The debate about whether George Rogers Clark "conquered" the Northwest Territory began soon after the Revolutionary War ended, when the government worked to sort out land claims and war debts. In July 1783, Governor Benjamin Harrison of Virginia thanked Clark for "wresting so great and valuable a territory out of the hands of the British Enemy." Clark himself never made such a claim, despairingly writing that he had never captured Detroit. "I have lost the object,” he said. In the 19th century and into the mid-20th century, Clark was frequently referred to as the "Conqueror of the Northwest" by historical writers. In the 20th century, however, many historians began to doubt that interpretation, arguing that because resource shortages compelled Clark to recall his troops from the Illinois Country before the end of the war, and because the Indigenous tribes of the area were unaffected, there was no "conquest" of the Northwest. It has further been argued that Clark's activities had no effect on the boundary negotiations in Europe. In 1940, historian Randolph Downes wrote, "It is misleading to say that Clark 'conquered' the Old Northwest, or that he 'captured' Kaskaskia, Cahokia, and Vincennes. It would be more accurate to say that he assisted the French and Indian inhabitants of that region to remove themselves from the very shadowy political rule of the British."
