= George Rogers Clark =

American military officer and surveyor (1752–1818)

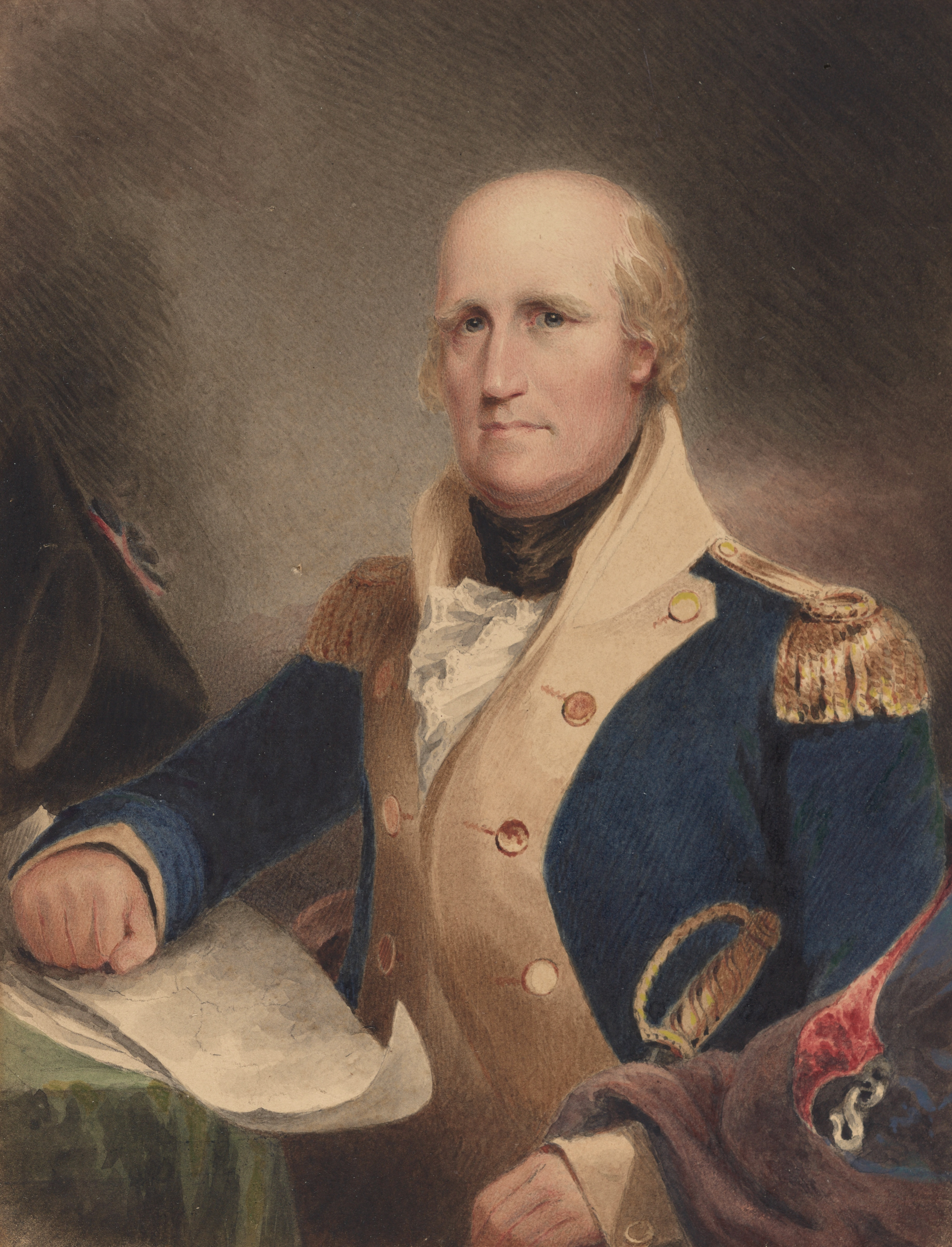
- Posthumous portrait by James B. Longacre, c. 1830
- Born: November 19, 1752; Albemarle County, Virginia, British America
- Died: February 13, 1818 (aged 65); Louisville, Kentucky, U.S.
- Burial place: Cave Hill Cemetery (Louisville)
- Relatives: Jonathan Clark (brother); William Clark (brother)
- Military career
- Allegiance: Virginia; United States
- Branch: Virginia Militia
- Service years: 1774–1790
- Rank: Brigadier-General
- Nicknames: Conqueror of the Old Northwest; Hannibal of the West; Washington of the West; Founder of the Commonwealth
- Unit: Illinois Regiment
- Commands: Western Frontier
- Known for: Capturing Kaskaskia, Illinois, and Vincennes, Indiana, during the Illinois campaign (American Revolutionary War); Founding Louisville
- Conflicts: Lord Dunmore's War; Battle of Point Pleasant; American Revolutionary War; Illinois campaign; Siege of Fort Sackville; Battle of Piqua; Northwest Indian War

George Rogers Clark (November 19, 1752 – February 13, 1818) was an American military officer and surveyor from Virginia who became the highest-ranking Patriot military officer on the northwestern frontier during the Revolutionary War. He served as leader of the Virginia militia in Kentucky (then part of Virginia) throughout much of the war, and is credited for founding Louisville, Kentucky in 1778. He is best known for his captures of Kaskaskia, Illinois, in 1778 and Vincennes, Indiana, in 1779 during the Illinois campaign, which greatly weakened British influence in the Northwest Territory (then part of the British Province of Quebec) and earned Clark the nickname "Conqueror of the Old Northwest". The British ceded the entire Northwest Territory to the United States in the 1783 Treaty of Paris.

Clark's major military achievements occurred before his thirtieth birthday. Afterward, he led militia forces in the opening engagements of the Northwest Indian War, but was accused of being drunk on duty. He was disgraced and forced to resign, despite his demand for a formal investigation into the accusations. Clark left Kentucky to live in the Indiana Territory but was never fully reimbursed by the Virginian government for his wartime expenditures. During the final decades of his life, he worked to evade creditors and suffered living in increasing poverty and obscurity. He was involved in two failed attempts to open the Spanish-controlled Mississippi River to American traffic. Following a stroke and the amputation of his right leg, he became disabled. Clark was aided in his final years by family members, including his younger brother William, one of the leaders of the Lewis and Clark Expedition. He died of a stroke on February 13, 1818.

== Early life ==
George Rogers Clark was born on November 19, 1752, in Albemarle County, Virginia, near Charlottesville, the hometown of Thomas Jefferson. He was the second of ten children borne by John and Ann Rogers Clark, who were Anglicans of English and possibly Scottish descent. Five of their six sons became officers during the American Revolutionary War. Their youngest son William, was too young to fight in the war, but he later became famous as a leader of the Lewis and Clark Expedition. The family moved from the frontier to Caroline County, Virginia, in 1756 after the outbreak of the French and Indian War. They lived on a 400-acre (1.6 km^{2}) plantation that they later developed to a total of more than 2,000 acres (8.1 km^{2}).

Clark had little formal education. He lived with his grandfather so that he could receive a common education at Donald Robertson's school, where fellow students included James Madison and John Taylor of Caroline. He was also tutored at home, as was usual for the children of Virginia planters in this period. There was no public education. His grandfather trained him to be a surveyor.

In 1771, at age 19, Clark left his home on his first surveying trip into western Virginia. In 1772, he made his first foray into Kentucky via the Ohio River at Pittsburgh and spent the next two years surveying the Kanawha River region, as well as learning about the area's natural history and customs of the various tribes of Indians who lived there. In the meantime, thousands of settlers were entering the area as a result of the Treaty of Fort Stanwix of 1768, by which some of the tribes had agreed to peace.

Clark's military career began in 1774, when he served as a captain in the Virginia militia. He was preparing to lead an expedition of 90 men down the Ohio River when hostilities broke out between the Shawnee and settlers on the Kanawha frontier; this conflict eventually culminated in Lord Dunmore's War. Most of Kentucky was not inhabited by Indians, although such tribes as the Shawnee, Cherokee, and Seneca (of the Iroquois Confederacy) used the area for hunting. Tribes in the Ohio Country who had not been party to the treaty signed with the Cherokee were angry, because the Kentucky hunting grounds had been ceded without their approval. As a result, they tried to resist encroachment by the American settlers, but were unsuccessful. Clark spent a few months surveying in Kentucky, as well as assisting in organizing Kentucky as a county for Virginia prior to the American Revolutionary War.

== Revolutionary War ==
As the American Revolutionary War began in the East, Kentucky's settlers became involved in a dispute about the region's sovereignty. Richard Henderson, a judge and land speculator from North Carolina, had purchased much of Kentucky from the Cherokee by an illegal treaty. Henderson intended to create a proprietary colony known as Transylvania, but many Kentucky settlers did not recognize Transylvania's authority over them. In June 1776, these settlers selected Clark and John Gabriel Jones to deliver a petition to the Virginia General Assembly, asking Virginia to formally extend its boundaries to include Kentucky.

Clark and Jones traveled the Wilderness Road to Williamsburg, where they convinced Governor Patrick Henry to create Kentucky County, Virginia. Clark was given 500 lb (230 kg) of gunpowder to help defend the settlements and was appointed a major in the Kentucky County militia. Although he was only 24 years old, he led older but lesser ranked settlers such as Daniel Boone, James Harrod and Benjamin Logan.

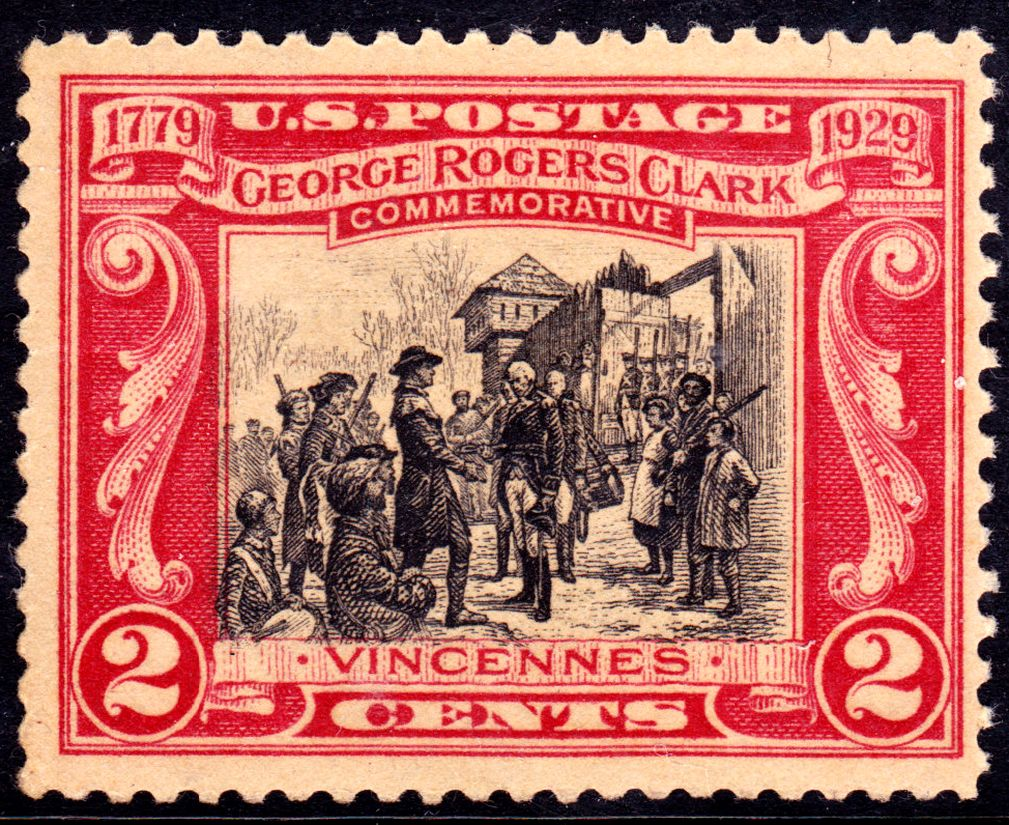
Depiction of George Rogers Clark recapturing Fort Sackville at the Battle of Vincennes on U.S. postage stamp, 1929 issue

=== Illinois campaign ===
In 1777, the Revolutionary War intensified in Kentucky. Lieutenant-governor Henry Hamilton, based at Fort Detroit, provided weapons to his Indian allies, supporting their raids on settlers in hope of reclaiming their lands. The Continental Army could spare no men for an invasion in the northwest or for the defense of Kentucky, which was left entirely to the local population. Clark spent several months defending settlements against the Indian raiders as a leader in the Kentucky County militia, while developing his plan for a long-distance strike against the British. His strategy involved seizing British outposts north of the Ohio River to destroy British influence among their Indian allies.

In December 1777, Clark presented his plan to Virginia's Governor Patrick Henry, and he asked for permission to lead a secret expedition to capture the British-held villages at Kaskaskia, Cahokia, and Vincennes in the Illinois Country. Governor Henry commissioned him as a lieutenant colonel in the Illinois Regiment of the Virginia State Forces and authorized him to raise troops for the expedition. The unit originally was raised as a special Virginia militia regiment for defense of the Western Department. Clark and his officers recruited volunteers from Pennsylvania, Virginia, and North Carolina. Clark arrived at Redstone, a settlement on the Monongahela River south of Fort Pitt on February 1, where he made preparations for the expedition over the next several months. The men gathered at Redstone and the regiment departed from there on May 12, proceeding on boats down the Monongahela to Fort Pitt to take on supplies and then down the Ohio to Fort Henry and on to Fort Randolph at the mouth of the Kanawha. They reached the Falls of the Ohio on May 27 where they spent about a month along the Ohio River preparing for their secret mission. The settlement they left behind at Corn Island led to the founding of Louisville, Kentucky, for which Clark came to be credited.

In July 1778, Clark led about 175 men of the Illinois Regiment and crossed the Ohio River at Fort Massac and marched to Kaskaskia, capturing it on the night of July 4 without firing their weapons. The next day, Captain Joseph Bowman and his company captured Cahokia in a similar fashion without firing a shot. The garrison at Vincennes along the Wabash River surrendered to Clark in August. Several other villages and British forts were subsequently captured, after British hopes of local support failed to materialize. To counter Clark's advance, Hamilton recaptured the garrison at Vincennes, which the British called Fort Sackville, with a small force in December 1778.

Prior to initiating a march on Fort Detroit, Clark used his own resources and borrowed from his friends to continue his campaign after the initial appropriation from the Virginia legislature had been depleted. He re-enlisted some of his troops and recruited additional men to join him. Hamilton waited for spring to begin a campaign to retake the forts at Kaskaskia and Cahokia, but Clark planned another surprise attack on Fort Sackville at Vincennes. He left Kaskaskia on February 6, 1779, with about 170 men, beginning an arduous overland trek, encountering melting snow, ice, and cold rain along the journey. They arrived at Vincennes on February 23 and besieged Fort Sackville. After a siege which included the killing of 5 captive Indians on Clark's orders to intimidate the British, Hamilton surrendered the garrison on February 25 and was captured in the process. The winter expedition was Clark's most significant military achievement and became the basis of his reputation as an early American military hero.

News of Clark's victory reached General George Washington, and his success was celebrated and was used to encourage the alliance with France. General Washington recognized that Clark's achievement had been gained without support from the regular army, either in men or funds. Virginia also capitalized on Clark's success, laying claim to the Old Northwest by calling it Illinois County, Virginia.

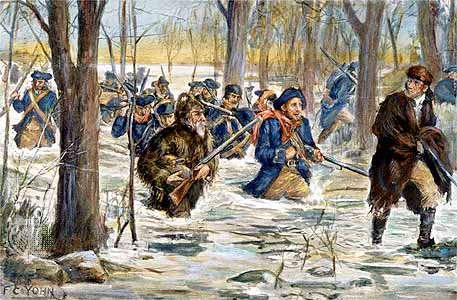
Clark's march to Vincennes was the most celebrated event of his career; it has been often depicted, as in this illustration by F. C. Yohn.

=== Final years of the war ===
Clark's ultimate goal during the Revolutionary War was to seize the British-held fort at Detroit, but he could never recruit enough men and acquire sufficient munitions to make the attempt. Kentucky militiamen generally preferred to defend their own territory and stay closer to home, rather than make the long and potentially perilous expedition to Detroit. Clark returned to the Falls of the Ohio and Louisville, Kentucky, where he continued to defend the Ohio River valley until the end of the war.

In June 1780, a mixed British-Indian force, including Shawnee, Lenape and Wyandot warriors, set out from Fort Detroit and invaded Kentucky. They captured two fortified settlements and seized hundreds of prisoners. In August 1780, Clark led a retaliatory force that defeated the Shawnee at the village of Peckuwe. It has been commemorated as George Rogers Clark Park near Springfield, Ohio.

In 1781, Virginia Governor Thomas Jefferson promoted Clark to brigadier general and gave him command of all the militia in the Kentucky and Illinois counties. As Clark prepared to lead another expedition against the British and their allies in Detroit, General Washington transferred a small group of regulars to assist, but the detachment was disastrously defeated in August 1781 before they could meet up with Clark. This ended the western campaign.

In August 1782, another British-Indian force defeated the Kentucky militia at the Battle of Blue Licks. Clark was the militia's senior military officer, but he had not been present at the battle and was severely criticized in the Virginia Council for the disaster. In response, during November 1782, Clark led another expedition into the Ohio Country, destroying several Indian villages along the Great Miami River, including the Shawnee village of Piqua, Miami County, Ohio. This was the last major expedition of the war.

The importance of Clark's activities during the Revolutionary War has been the subject of much debate among historians. As early as 1779, George Mason called Clark the "Conqueror of the Northwest". Because the British ceded the entire Old Northwest Territory to the United States in the Treaty of Paris, some historians, including William Hayden English, credit Clark with nearly doubling the size of the original Thirteen Colonies when he seized control of the Illinois Country during the war. Clark's Illinois campaign—particularly the surprise march to Vincennes—was greatly celebrated and romanticized.

More recent scholarship from historians such as Lowell Harrison has downplayed the importance of the campaign in the peace negotiations and the outcome of the war, arguing that Clark's "conquest" was little more than a temporary occupation of territory. Although the Illinois campaign is frequently described in terms of a harsh, winter ordeal for the Americans, James Fischer points out that the capture of Kaskaskia and Vincennes may not have been as difficult as previously suggested. Kaskaskia proved to be an easy target; Clark had sent two spies there in June 1777, who reported "an absence of soldiers in the town."

Clark's men also easily captured Vincennes and Fort Sackville. Prior to their arrival in 1778, Clark had sent Captain Leonard Helm to Vincennes to gather intelligence. In addition, Father Pierre Gibault, a local priest, helped persuade the town's inhabitants to side with the Americans. Before Clark and his men set out to recapture Vincennes in 1779, Francis Vigo provided Clark with additional information on the town, its surrounding area, and the fort. Clark was already aware of the fort's military strength, poor location (surrounded by houses that could provide cover to attackers), and dilapidated condition. Clark's strategy of a surprise attack and strong intelligence were critical in catching Hamilton and his men unaware and vulnerable. After killing several captive Indians by hatchet within view of the fort, Clark forced its surrender.

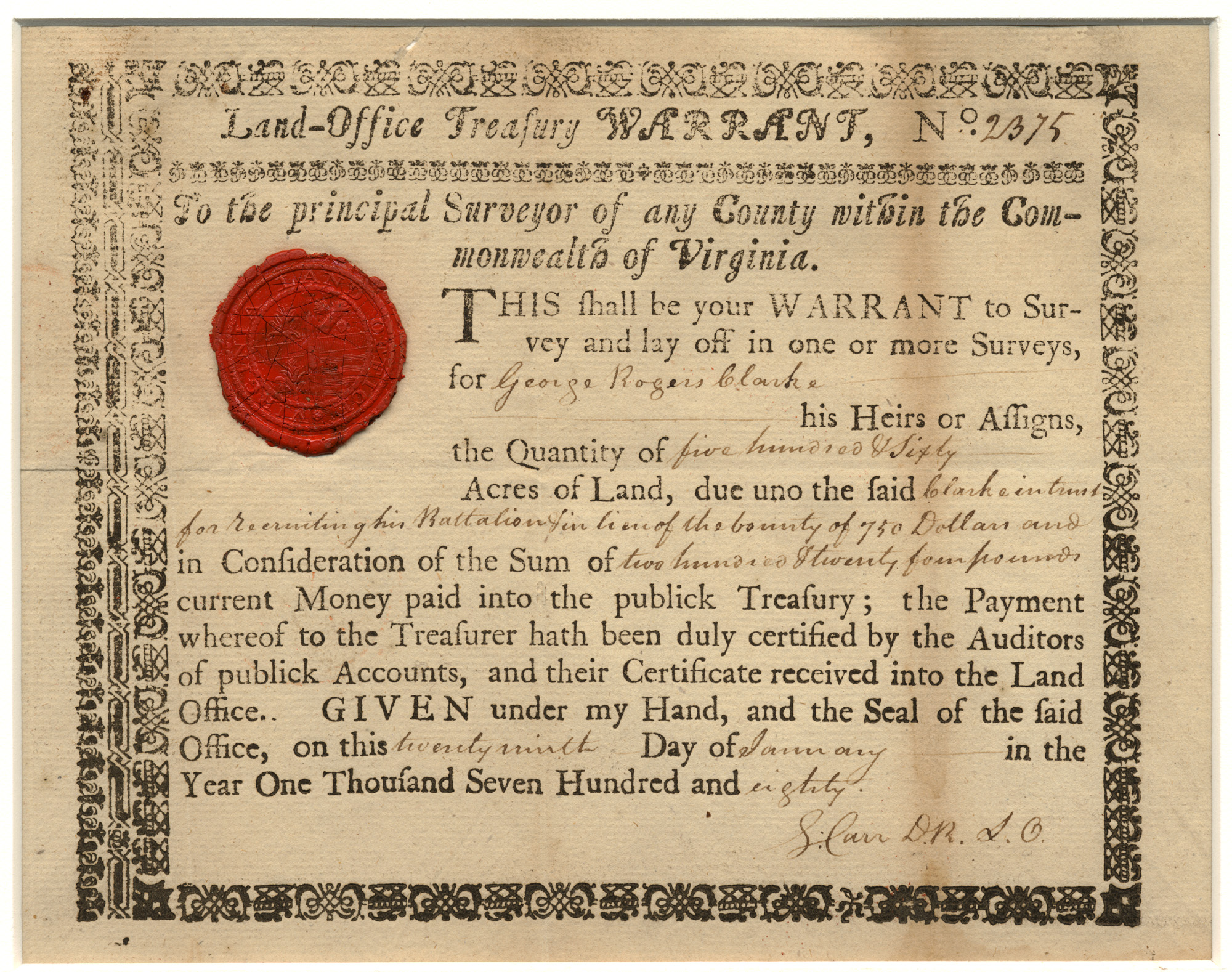
Virginia Land Office warrant to Clark for 560 acres for having raised a battalion to fight in the Revolutionary War, January 1780

== Later years ==
In 1783, Clark, who reputedly hated Native Americans and once declared that he would like to see "the whole race of Indians extirpated, that for his part he would never spare Man woman or child of them on whom he could lay his hands", publicly proposed that a 2,000-strong force be mustered in Virginia to attack Native Americans in the Ohio Valley. Clark argued that this proposed expedition would show "that [the United States] are always able to crush [Native Americans] at our pleasure". He also once told Native Americans that if they declared war on the United States, they "should know that the next thing would be the Tomahawk" with "Your Women & Children given to the Dogs to eat". The proposed expedition was never carried out due to budgetary concerns.

After Clark's victories in the Illinois Country, settlers continued to pour into Kentucky and spread into and develop the land north of the Ohio River. On December 17, 1783, Clark was appointed Principal Surveyor of Bounty Lands. From 1784 to 1788, Clark served as the superintendent-surveyor for Virginia's war veterans, surveying lands granted to them for their service in the war. The position brought Clark a small income, but he devoted very little time to the enterprise.

Clark helped to negotiate the Treaty of Fort McIntosh in 1785 and the Treaty of Fort Finney in 1786, but the violence between Native Americans and European-American settlers continued to escalate. According to a 1790 U.S. government report, 1,500 Kentucky settlers had been killed in Indian raids since the end of the Revolutionary War. In an attempt to end the raids, Clark led an expedition of 1,200 drafted men against Native American villages along the Wabash River in 1786. The campaign, one of the first actions of the Northwest Indian War, ended without a victory. After approximately three hundred militiamen mutinied due to a lack of supplies, Clark had to withdraw, but not before concluding a ceasefire with the native tribes. It was rumored, most notably by James Wilkinson, that Clark had often been drunk on duty. When Clark learned of the accusations, he demanded an official inquiry, but the Virginia governor declined his request and Virginia Council condemned Clark's actions. With Clark's reputation tarnished, he never again led men in battle. Clark left Kentucky and moved across the Ohio River to the Indiana frontier, near present-day Clarksville, Indiana.

=== Life in Indiana ===
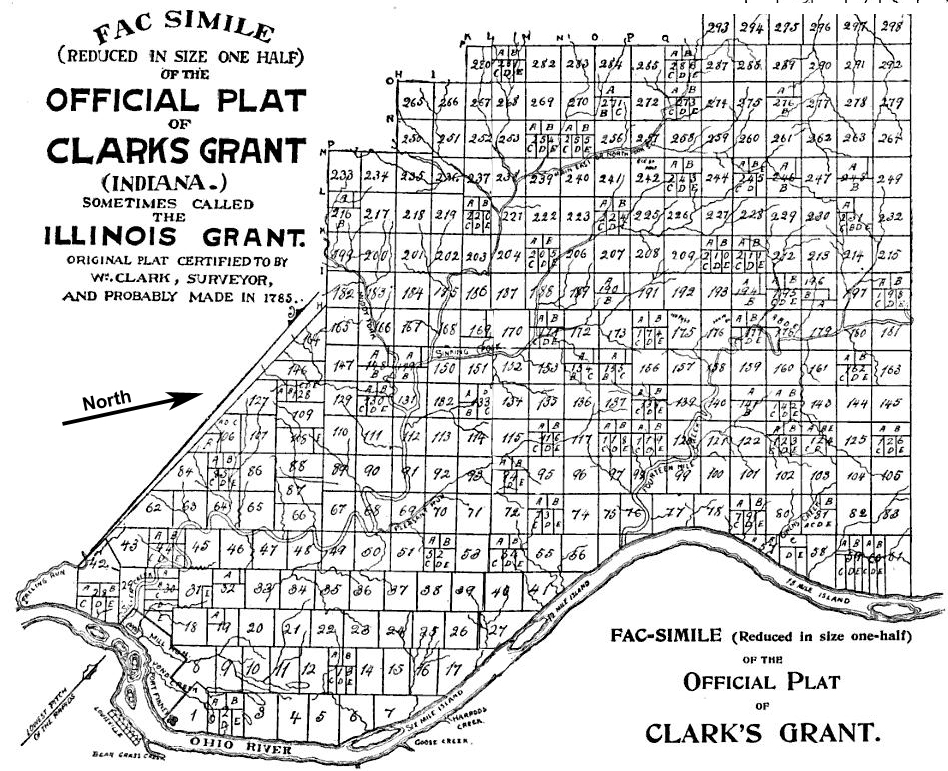
Original plat of Clark's Grant

Following his military service, and especially after 1787, Clark spent much of the remainder of his life dealing with financial difficulties. Clark had financed the majority of his military campaigns with borrowed funds. When creditors began pressuring him to repay his debts, Clark was unable to obtain reimbursement from Virginia or the United States Congress. Due to haphazard record keeping on the frontier during the war, Virginia refused payment, claiming that Clark's receipts for his purchases were "fraudulent".

As compensation for his wartime service, Virginia gave Clark a gift of 150,000 acres (610 km^{2}) of land that became known as Clark's Grant in present-day southern Indiana, while the soldiers who fought with Clark also received smaller tracts of land. The grant and his other holdings gave Clark ownership of land that encompassed present-day Clark County, Indiana, and portions of adjoining Floyd and Scott counties. Although Clark had claims to tens of thousands of acres of land as the result of his military service and land speculation, he was "land-poor," meaning that he owned much land but lacked the resources to develop it. In the early twentieth century, Clark's receipts were discovered in the Richmond Virginia's Auditors building showing that his record keeping efforts were complete and correct but not reimbursed due to the State of Virginia's incompetency, thus he was exonerated, though not officially. Although his autobiography contains factual inaccuracies, the work includes Clark's perspective on the events of his life. Some historians believe Clark wrote his memoirs in an attempt to salvage his damaged reputation and to document his contributions during the Revolutionary War.

=== In the service of the French ===
On February 2, 1793, with his career seemingly over and his prospects for prosperity doubtful, Clark offered his services to Edmond-Charles Genêt, the controversial ambassador of revolutionary France, hoping to earn money to maintain his estate. Many Americans were outraged that the Spanish, who controlled Louisiana, denied Americans free access to the Mississippi River, their only easy outlet for long-distance commerce. The Washington administration was also unresponsive to western matters.

Genêt appointed Clark "Major General in the Armies of France and Commander-in-chief of the French Revolutionary Legion on the Mississippi River". Clark began to organize a campaign to seize New Madrid, St. Louis, Natchez, and New Orleans, getting assistance from old comrades such as Benjamin Logan and John Montgomery, and winning the tacit support of Kentucky governor Isaac Shelby. Clark spent $4,680 (equivalent to $88,782 in 2025) of his own money for supplies.

In early 1794, however, President Washington issued a proclamation forbidding Americans from violating U.S. neutrality and threatened to dispatch General Anthony Wayne to Fort Massac to stop the expedition. The French government recalled Genêt and revoked the commissions he granted to the Americans for the war against Spain. Clark's planned campaign gradually collapsed, and he was unable to convince the French to reimburse him for his expenses. Clark's reputation, already damaged by earlier accusations at the end of the Revolutionary War, was further maligned as a result of his involvement in these foreign intrigues. Brigadier General James Wilkinson, 2nd in command of the Legion of the United States, claimed credit for undermining Clark and for preventing supplies from being shipped down the Ohio River.

=== Mounting debts ===
In his later years Clark's mounting debts made it impossible for him to retain ownership of his land, since it became subject to seizure due to his debts. Clark deeded much of his land to friends or transferred ownership to family members so his creditors could not seize it. Lenders and their assignees eventually deprived the veteran of nearly all of the property that remained in his name. Clark, who was at one time the largest landholder in the Northwest Territory, was left with only a small plot of land in Clarksville. In 1803 Clark built a cabin overlooking the Falls of the Ohio, where he lived until his health failed in 1809. He also purchased a small gristmill, which Clark operated with two slaves he owned.

Clark's knowledge of the region helped him to become an expert on the West's natural history. Over the years he welcomed travelers, including those interested in natural history, to his home overlooking the Ohio River. Clark supplied details on the area's plant and animal life to John Pope and John James Audubon, and hosted his brother, William, and Meriwether Lewis, prior to their expedition to the Pacific Northwest. Clark also provided information on the Ohio Valley's native tribes to Allan Bowie Magruder and archaeological evidence related to the Mound Builders to John P. Campbell.

In later life Clark continued to struggle with alcohol abuse, a problem which had plagued him on-and-off for many years. He also remained bitter about his treatment and neglect by Virginia, and blamed it for his financial misfortune.

When the Indiana Territory chartered the Indiana Canal Company in 1805 to build a canal around the Falls of the Ohio, near Clarksville, Clark was named to the board of directors. He became part of the surveying team that assisted in laying out the route of the canal. The company collapsed the next year before construction could begin, when two of the fellow board members, including Vice President Aaron Burr, were arrested for treason. A large part of the company's $1.2 million (equivalent to $25.8 million USD in 2025) in investments was unaccounted for; its location was never determined.

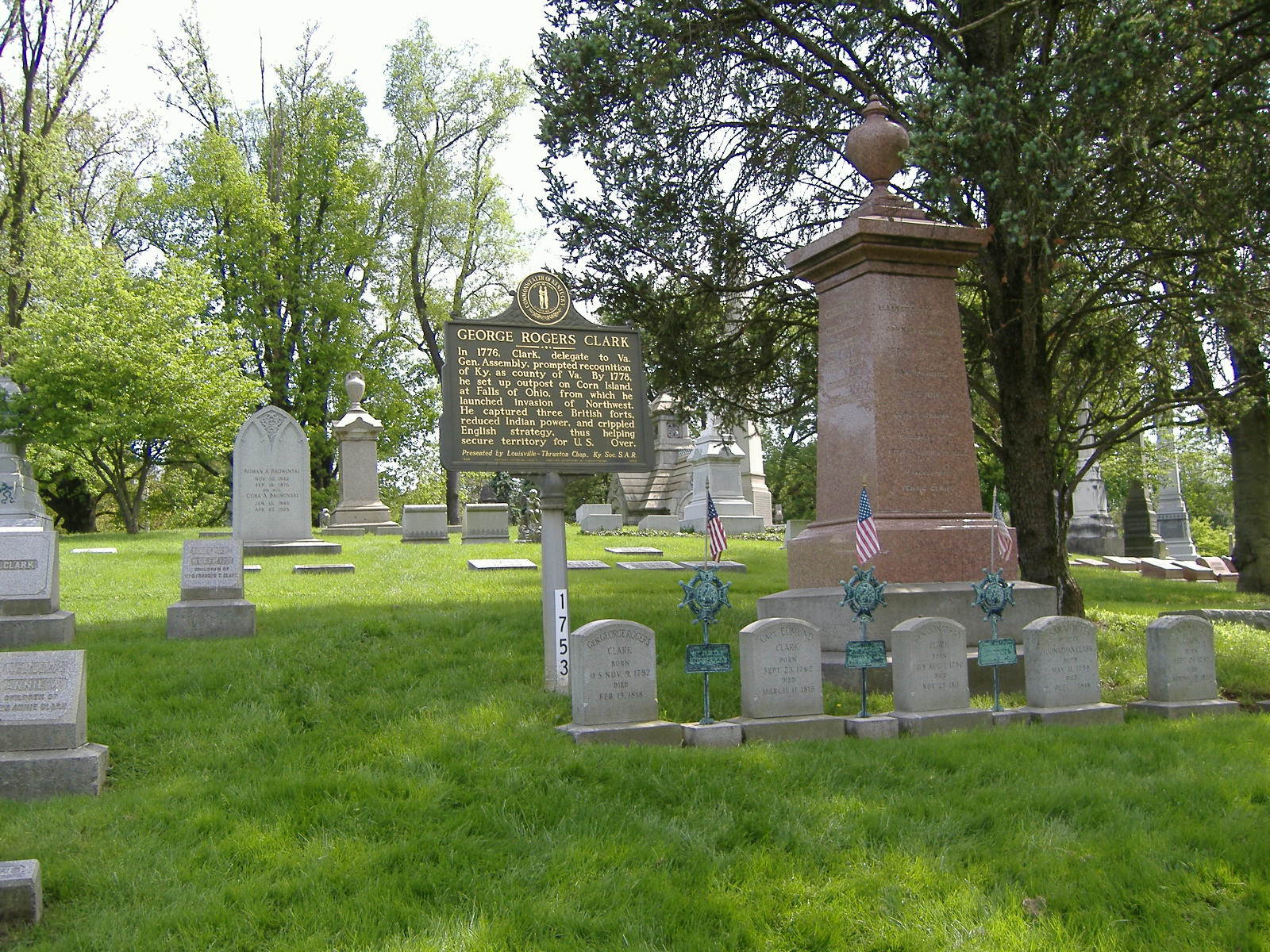
Grave site of Clark at Cave Hill Cemetery in Louisville

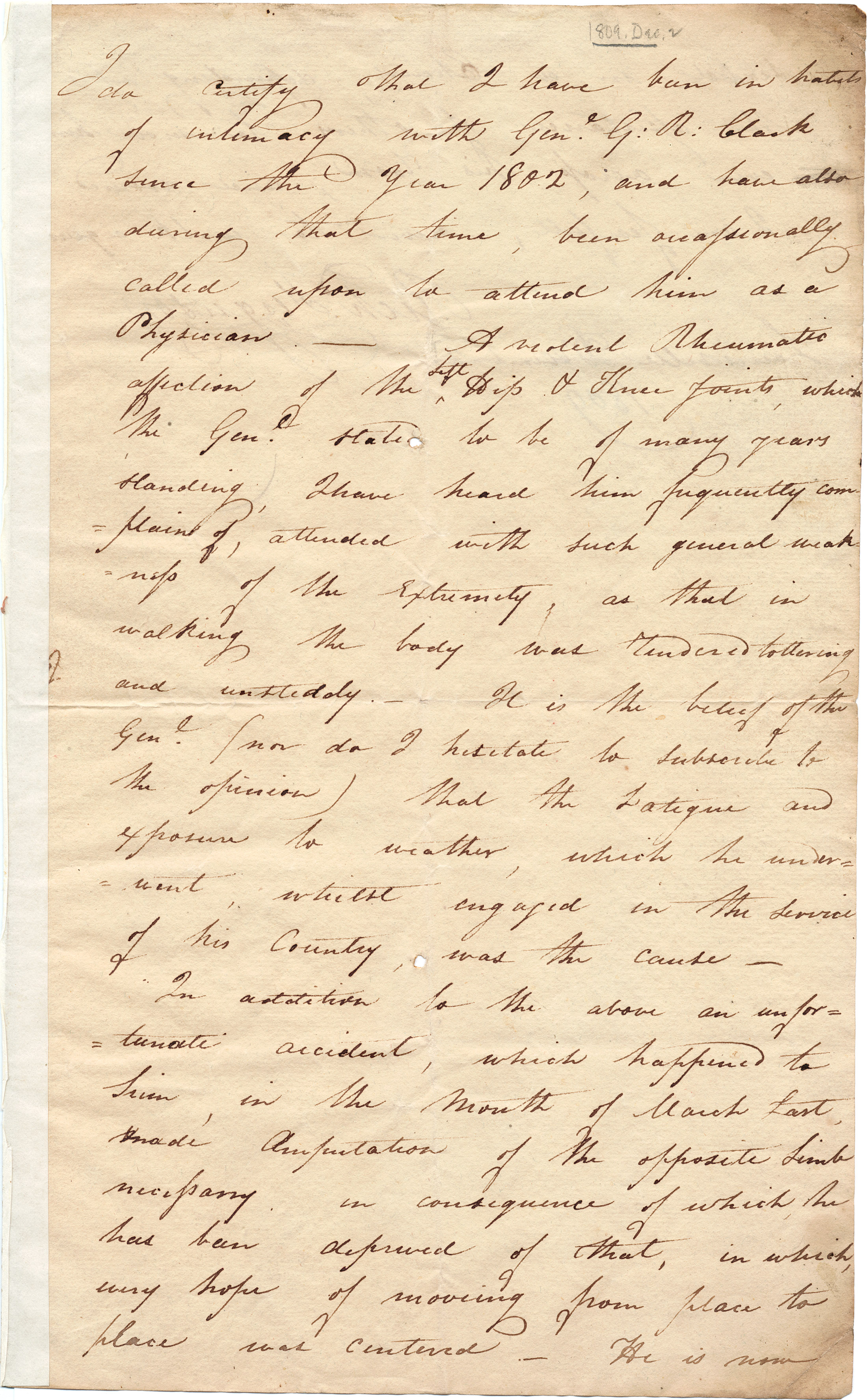
Statement from Clark's physician noting the General's health problems, which the doctor ascribed to the severe conditions the General had endured during his wartime service, December 1809

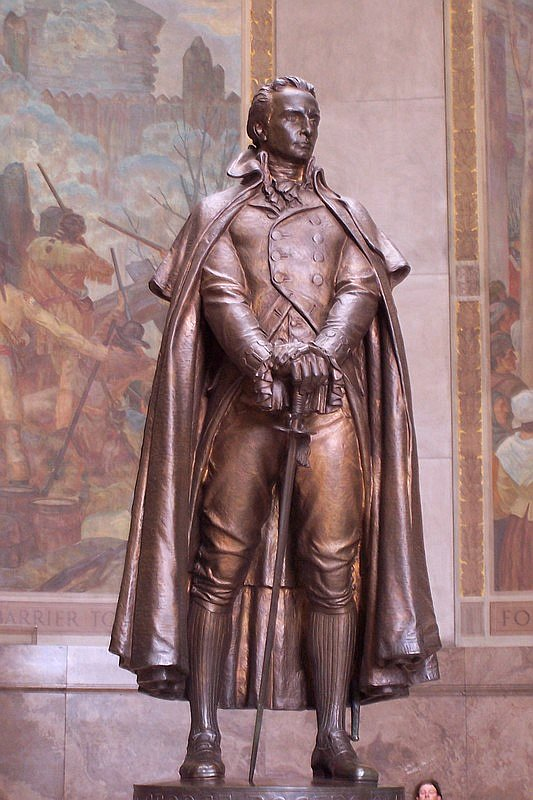
Statue by MacNeil at George Rogers Clark National Historical Park

=== Return to Kentucky ===
Alcoholism and poor health affected Clark during his final years. In 1809, he suffered a severe stroke. When he fell into a burning fireplace, he suffered a burn on his right leg that was so severe it had to be amputated. The injury made it impossible for Clark to continue to operate his mill and live independently. As a result, he moved to Locust Grove, a farm eight miles (13 km) from the growing town of Louisville, and became a member of the household of his sister, Lucy, and brother-in-law, Major William Croghan, a planter.

In 1812, the Virginia General Assembly granted Clark a pension of four hundred dollars per year (an equivalent of US$9,488 in 2024) and finally recognized his services in the Revolutionary War by presenting him with a ceremonial sword.

== Death and legacy ==
After a third stroke, Clark died at Locust Grove on February 13, 1818; he was buried at Locust Grove Cemetery two days later. Clark's remains were exhumed along with those of his other family members on October 29, 1869, and buried at Cave Hill Cemetery in Louisville.

In his funeral oration, Judge John Rowan succinctly summed up Clark's stature and importance during the critical years on the trans-Appalachian frontier: "The mighty oak of the forest has fallen, and now the scrub oaks sprout all around." Clark's career was closely tied to events in the Ohio-Mississippi Valley at a pivotal time when the region was inhabited by numerous Native American tribes and claimed by the British, Spanish, and French, as well as the fledgling U.S. government. As a member of the Virginia militia, and with Virginia's support, Clark's campaign into the Illinois Country helped strengthen Virginia's claim on lands in the region as it came under the control of the Americans. Clark's military service in the interior of North America also helped him became an "important source of leadership and information (although not necessarily accurate) on the West."

Clark is best known as a war hero of the Revolutionary War in the West, especially as the leader of the secret expeditionary forces that captured Kaskaskia, Cahokia, and Vincennes in 1778–79. Some historians have suggested that the campaign supported American claims to the Northwest Territory during negotiations that resulted in the Treaty of Paris (1783). Clark's Grant, the large tract of land on the north side of the Ohio River that he received as compensation for his military service, included a large portion of Clark County, Indiana, and portions of Floyd and Scott Counties, as well as the present-day site of Clarksville, Indiana, the first American town laid out in the Northwest Territory (in 1784). Clark served as the first chairman of the Clarksville, Indiana, board of trustees. Clark was unable to retain title to his landholdings. At the end of his life, he was poor, in ill health, and frequently intoxicated.

Several years after Clark's death the government of Virginia granted his estate $30,000 (equivalent to $853,676 in 2025) as a partial payment on the debts it owed him. The Virginian government continued to repay Clark for decades; the last payment to his estate was made in 1913. Clark never married and he kept no account of any romantic relationships, although his family held that he had once been in love with Teresa de Leyba, sister of Fernando de Leyba, the lieutenant governor of Spanish Louisiana. Writings from his niece and cousin in the Draper Manuscripts in the archives of the Wisconsin Historical Society attest to their belief in Clark's lifelong disappointment over the failed romance.

== Honors and tributes ==
- A bronze statue of Clark is one of several erected on Monument Circle, surrounding the Soldiers' and Sailors' Monument, in downtown Indianapolis. Sculptor John H. Mahoney received the commission to create the statue, which was completed in 1895.
- The Daughters of the American Revolution placed a statue of Clark by sculptor Leon Hermant at Metropolis, the site of Fort Massac, in Massac County, Illinois, in 1907.
- A Clark statue was erected in Riverview Park, on the eastern bank of the Mississippi River at Quincy, Illinois, in 1909.
- Robert Aitken's bronze sculpture of Clark was erected on Monument Square, on the grounds of the University of Virginia at Charlottesville, Virginia, in 1921. It was removed by the University of Virginia in July 2021, after it was deemed offensive in its portrayal of Native Americans and its removal was recommended by a racial equity task force.
- In 1924, Charles Keck created the memorial statue of Clark at the site of the Battle of Piqua, near Springfield, Ohio.
- On May 23, 1928, President Calvin Coolidge ordered a memorial to Clark to be erected at Vincennes, Indiana. Completed in 1933, the George Rogers Clark Memorial was dedicated on June 14, 1936, by President Franklin D. Roosevelt. The Roman-style temple was erected on what was believed to have been the site of Fort Sackville. The site, now called the George Rogers Clark National Historical Park, became a part of the National Park Service in 1966. Hermon Atkins MacNeil created the monument's 7.5-foot (2.3 m) bronze statue of Clark. The monument's walls include seven murals depicting Clark's famous expedition. Also included is a bas-relief, created by Sculptor Joseph Kiselewski, which depicts a young George Rogers Clark receiving his orders to attack the British outposts on the Western frontier from Patrick Henry.
- On February 25, 1929, to commemorate the 150th anniversary of the surrender of Fort Sackville, the U.S. Postal Service issued a two-cent postage stamp depicting the event.
- In April 1929, the Paul Revere Chapter of the Daughters of the American Revolution of Muncie, Indiana, erected a monument to Clark on Washington Avenue in Fredericksburg, Virginia.
- In 1973, sculptor Felix de Weldon created the Clark statue at Riverfront Plaza/Belvedere, next to the wharf on the Ohio River, in Louisville, Kentucky.
- In 1975, the Indiana General Assembly designated February 25 as George Rogers Clark Day in Indiana.
- In 1979, Indiana's automobile license plates commemorated the 200th anniversary of Clark's capture of Fort Sackville.
- On March 23, 2005, the Ohio General Assembly designated November 19 as George Rogers Clark Day in Ohio.
- On November 13, 2017, the United States Mint issued an America the Beautiful Quarter in honor of Clark, representing the state of Indiana. The back of the quarter depicts Clark leading his men through the flooded plains approaching Fort Sackville.

=== Eponyms ===
Counties

- Clark County, Illinois
- Clark County, Indiana
- Clark County, Kentucky
- Clark County, Ohio
- Clarke County, Virginia
- Clark County, Wisconsin

Communities

- Clarksville, Indiana
- Clarksville, Tennessee
- Clarksburg, West Virginia

Schools

- George Rogers Clark Elementary School in Chicago
- George Rogers Clark Middle/High School in Whiting, Indiana (closed in 2021)
- George Rogers Clark High School in Winchester, Kentucky
- George Rogers Clark Elementary School in Charlottesville, Virginia

Other sites and structures

- George Rogers Clark Memorial Bridge in Louisville, Kentucky
- George Rogers Clark Trail in Indiana (established in 1979)
- Clark Street in Chicago

== See also ==
- History of Louisville, Kentucky
- List of people from the Louisville metropolitan area
- George Rogers Clark Flag
- Old Clarksville site
- Bust of George Rogers Clark

== Bibliography ==
- Clark, George Rogers (1912). James, James Alton (ed.). George Rogers Clark papers, 1781–1784. Virginia Series. Vol. IV. Springfield, Ill. : Illinois State Historical Library.
- Dunn, Jacob Piatt Jr. (1919). Indiana and Indianans: A History of Aboriginal and Territorial Indiana and The Century of Statehood. Chicago and New York: American Historical Society.
- English, William Hayden (1896). Conquest of the Country Northwest of the River Ohio, 1778–1783, and Life of Gen. George Rogers Clark. Indianapolis: Bowen-Merrill.
- Fischer, James (June 1996). "A Forgotten Hero Remembered, Revered, and Revised: The Legacy and Ordeal of George Rogers Clark". Indiana Magazine of History. 92 (2). Bloomington: Indiana University: 109–32. Archived from the original on October 18, 2016.
- Greiff, Glory-June (2005). Remembrance, Faith and Fancy: Outdoor Public Sculpture in Indiana. Indianapolis: Indiana Historical Society Press. ISBN 0-87195-180-0.
- Gugin, Linda C.; St. Clair, James E., eds. (2015). Indiana's 200: The People Who Shaped the Hoosier State. Indianapolis: Indiana Historical Society Press. pp. 60–63. ISBN 978-0-87195-387-2.
- Harrison, Lowell H. (2001) [1976]. George Rogers Clark and the War in the West. Lexington: University Press of Kentucky. ISBN 0-8131-9014-2.
- James, James Alton (1928). The Life of George Rogers Clark. Chicago: University of Chicago Press.
- Palmer, Frederick (1929). Clark of the Ohio: A Life of George Rogers Clark. Kessinger Publishing.
- Price, Nelson (1997). Indiana Legends: Famous Hoosiers From Johnny Appleseed to David Letterman. Carmel, IN: Guild Press of Indiana. pp. 9–11. ISBN 1578600065.
- Sheehan, Bernard W. (March 1983). "'The Famous Hair Buyer General': Henry Hamilton, George Rogers Clark, and the American Indian". Indiana Magazine of History. 79 (1). Bloomington: Indiana University: 1–28.
