= Clark's Grant =

1781 land grant by the US state of Virginia

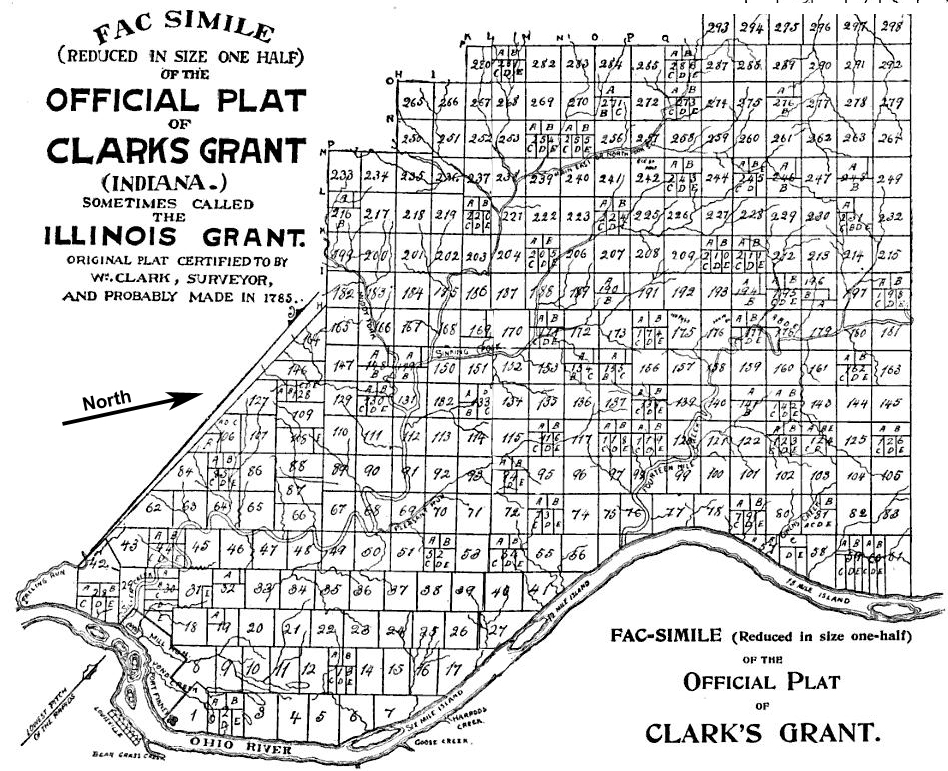
Original plat of Clark's Grant

Clark's Grant was a tract of land granted in 1781 to George Rogers Clark and the soldiers who fought with him during the American Revolutionary War by the state of Virginia in honor of their service. The tract was 150,000 acres (610 km^{2}) and located in present-day Clark County, Indiana, and parts of the surrounding counties.

== Grant ==
During the American Revolutionary War, George Rogers Clark led the militia of Virginia in capturing a large part of the Illinois Country as part of the Illinois Campaign. Land was offered as an incentive to adventurers to sign up as soldiers and join the expedition. After the war ended, as a reward, Virginia granted the soldiers and officers land to make good their promise.

The grant was made by the legislature of Virginia on January 2, 1781, offering them land on the northwest side of the Ohio River. A commission of officers from the group was created and they were granted the right to choose any 150,000 acres (610 km^{2}) within the defined region. They chose a tract across the Ohio River opposite from Louisville, Kentucky, a settlement Clark had founded during the war. Their land included all of present-day Clark County, Indiana, as well as part of the surrounding counties. The group took part in land speculation and they ultimately purchased the rights to a large part of southern Indiana. Early settlements in the grant included Clarksville and Jeffersonville.

Clark himself was still owed a vast sum of money for helping to finance the campaigns which was never repaid to him during his life. Most of his land was taken from him by creditors, and he died nearly penniless and handicapped from injuries he sustained after the war. Virginia finally repaid most of his debt several years after his death.

== Apportionment ==
Clark's Grant was the basis of the establishment of the first American settlements in the modern state of Indiana. The land was allotted during 1784. Clark himself received the largest tract, containing over 8,000 acres (32 km^{2}). Officers were also granted large tracts, and the 236 privates each were given a 108-acre (0.44 km^{2}) tract. The sergeants were each given tracts of 216 acres (0.87 km^{2}). Higher-ranking officers were given progressively larger tracts. Each person was given one or more large tracts in the countryside, and one smaller tract. The smaller tracts were grouped together around the entire grants and were intended to become settlements. It was hoped that the soldiers would build their homes on the small tracts that were near together, and sell or farm the larger tracts granted to them in the countryside. There was some controversy over the grant, because privates were promised at least 300-acre (1.2 km^{2}) tracts at the start of the war as reward.

== See also ==
- History of Indiana

== Sources ==
- English, William Hayden (1896). Conquest of the Country Northwest of the River Ohio, 1778–1783, and Life of Gen. George Rogers Clark. Vol. 1&2. Indianapolis: Bowen-Merrill.
