= National Register of Historic Places listings in Mercer County, Kentucky =

Location of Mercer County in Kentucky

This is a list of the National Register of Historic Places listings in Mercer County, Kentucky.

This is intended to be a complete compilation on the National Register of Historic Places in Mercer County, Kentucky, United States. The locations of National Register properties and districts for which latitude and longitude coordinates are provided below may be viewed on a map.

There are 71 properties and districts listed on the National Register in the county; one of these is a National Historic Landmark. One additional property was previously listed but has since been removed..

This National Park Service list is complete through NPS recent listings posted December 12, 2025.

== Current listings ==
	Name on the Register	Image	Date listed	Location	City or town	Description
1	Adams House		February 8, 1989 (#88003357)	Van Arsdell Pike; 37°53′01″N 84°55′24″W	Salvisa	
2	Archeological Site 15ME15		July 11, 1985 (#85001507)	Across the Salt River from the mouth of Dry Branch Creek; 37°43′50″N 84°51′48″W	Harrodsburg	Also known as "Mercer Village"
3	Aspen Hall	Aspen Hall	February 8, 1989 (#88003372)	558 Aspen Hall Dr. 37°45′15″N 84°50′34″W	Harrodsburg	
4	Baldin House		February 8, 1989 (#88003349)	South of Ebenezer on Ebenezer Rd. 37°52′32″N 84°48′57″W	Ebenezer	
5	Beaumont Avenue Residential District	Beaumont Avenue Residential District	February 8, 1989 (#88003359)	338-538 Beaumont Ave. 37°45′24″N 84°50′36″W	Harrodsburg	
6	Boise House		February 8, 1989 (#88003356)	Bohon Rd. east of Salt River; 37°48′11″N 84°52′40″W	Harrodsburg	
7	Bonta House		February 8, 1989 (#88003354)	Northeast of Danville on U.S. Route 127; 37°43′11″N 84°49′07″W	Danville	
8	Col. John Bowman House		February 8, 1989 (#88003353)	Kennedy Bridge Rd. 37°44′21″N 84°43′39″W	Harrodsburg	
9	Burford Hill	Burford Hill	February 8, 1989 (#88003367)	Greenville St. 37°46′21″N 84°50′26″W	Harrodsburg	
10	Burris House		February 8, 1989 (#88003362)	South of Kirkwood Rd. 37°54′33″N 84°53′03″W	Salvisa	
11	Nathaniel Burrus House	Nathaniel Burrus House	August 1, 1984 (#84001840)	955 Vanarsdall Rd. 37°53′45″N 84°53′31″W	Harrodsburg	
12	Ambrose Burton House		August 11, 1983 (#83002826)	Unity Rd. 37°51′09″N 84°50′18″W	Harrodsburg	
13	Cardwellton	Cardwellton	November 17, 1977 (#77000636)	103 E. Broadway; 37°45′49″N 84°50′34″W	Harrodsburg	
14	Clay Hill	Clay Hill	November 7, 1976 (#76000925)	433 Beaumont Ave. 37°45′29″N 84°50′33″W	Harrodsburg	
15	College Street Historic District	College Street Historic District	February 9, 1979 (#79001023)	College St. from North Lane to Factory St. 37°45′59″N 84°50′43″W	Harrodsburg	
16	Confederate Monument in Harrodsburg	Confederate Monument in Harrodsburg	July 17, 1997 (#97000677)	Springhill Cemetery, 0.5 miles southeast of the junction of U.S. Route 127 and Kentucky Route 1989; 37°46′09″N 84°50′29″W	Harrodsburg	
17	Cunningham House		February 9, 1989 (#88003361)	West of railroad tracks in Bondville; 37°55′15″N 84°52′24″W	Salvisa	
18	Daniel Curry House	Daniel Curry House	February 9, 1989 (#88003383)	414 N. Main St. 37°46′03″N 84°50′36″W	Harrodsburg	
19	Benjamin Daniel House		August 2, 1983 (#83002827)	Northeast of Harrodsburg off U.S. Route 68; 37°50′43″N 84°44′22″W	Harrodsburg	
20	Daughters' College		April 2, 1980 (#80001656)	638 Beaumont Dr. 37°45′09″N 84°50′34″W	Harrodsburg	
21	Doricham	Doricham	October 22, 1976 (#76000926)	409 N. College St. 37°46′04″N 84°50′41″W	Harrodsburg	
22	Peter Dunn House		February 9, 1989 (#88003358)	South of McAfee off Old U.S. Route 127; 37°50′42″N 84°51′19″W	McAfee	
23	Dutch Reformed Church		February 16, 1973 (#73000819)	3 miles southwest of Harrodsburg on Dry Branch Rd. 37°43′27″N 84°51′48″W	Harrodsburg	
24	The Elms	The Elms	February 9, 1989 (#88003370)	354 E. Lexington; 37°45′42″N 84°50′20″W	Harrodsburg	
25	Fairview		August 1, 1984 (#84001883)	2408 Lexington Rd. 37°48′22″N 84°46′41″W	Harrodsburg	
26	Forsythe-Shewmaker House		February 28, 2012 (#12000048)	603 Vanarsdall Rd. 37°53′42″N 84°52′42″W	Harrodsburg	
27	Froman-McCann House		July 27, 2004 (#02000344)	532 Bailey Pike; 37°46′22″N 84°46′52″W	Harrodsburg	
28	Greek Revival Houses of Mercer County: Lynnwood, Walnut Hall, Glenworth		March 30, 1978 (#78001388)	North and east of Harrodsburg off U.S. Route 127; 37°45′45″N 84°47′16″W	Harrodsburg	
29	Greystone		February 9, 1989 (#88003382)	618 Beaumont Ave. 37°45′13″N 84°50′33″W	Harrodsburg	Actual address is 618 Beaumont Inn Dr.
30	Floyd Gritton House		February 9, 1989 (#88003363)	Bondville Rd. west of Salt River; 37°56′06″N 84°54′13″W	Salvisa	
31	Harrodsburg Armory	Harrodsburg Armory	March 24, 2000 (#00000281)	130 N. College St. 37°45′48″N 84°50′45″W	Harrodsburg	
32	Harrodsburg Downtown Historic District	Harrodsburg Downtown Historic District	April 3, 1980 (#80001657)	Roughly bounded by Lexington, Greenville, and Chiles Sts. and Moreland and Beaumont Aves.; also 109-225 E. Poplar, 115, 125 W. Poplar, 320 -104 S. Chiles, 122, 112, 108 W. Lexington; 37°45′37″N 84°50′36″W	Harrodsburg	Second set of addresses represent a boundary increase approved December 12, 2017.
33	Honeysuckle Hill	Honeysuckle Hill	August 11, 1983 (#83002828)	712 Beaumont Ave. 37°45′01″N 84°50′18″W	Harrodsburg	
34	Moses Jones House		February 9, 1979 (#79001024)	North of Harrodsburg on Oregon Rd. 37°54′45″N 84°48′21″W	Harrodsburg	
35	Lexington and Cane Run Historic District		November 14, 2011 (#11000795)	E. Lexington & Cane Run Sts. 37°45′43″N 84°50′17″W	Harrodsburg	
36	Lexington, Harrodsburg, and Perryville Turnpike Rural Historic District		October 23, 2003 (#03000087)	U.S. Route 68; 37°48′35″N 84°46′52″W	Harrodsburg	
37	Beriah Magoffin Monument	Beriah Magoffin Monument	July 17, 1997 (#97000676)	Springhill Cemetery, 0.5 miles southeast of the junction of U.S. Route 127 and KY 1989; 37°46′10″N 84°50′20″W	Harrodsburg	
38	Matheny-Taylor House	Matheny-Taylor House	February 9, 1989 (#88003378)	Poplar and College Sts. 37°45′42″N 84°50′45″W	Harrodsburg	
39	McAfee Farm Historic District	McAfee Farm Historic District	February 9, 1989 (#88003360)	South of McAfee on Old Louisville Rd. 37°50′18″N 84°51′49″W	McAfee	
40	George McAfee House		June 23, 1983 (#83002829)	Off KY 1160; 37°50′51″N 84°52′46″W	Cornishville	
41	James McAfee House	James McAfee House	June 23, 1983 (#83002830)	Talmage Rd; 37°51′24″N 84°52′20″W	Harrodsburg	
42	Joseph McCoun-D.S. Sharp House		August 3, 2005 (#05000788)	Junction of Bondville Rd. and Crews St. 37°55′13″N 84°52′16″W	Bondville/Salvisa	
43	McGee House		February 9, 1989 (#88003364)	Jackson Rd. 37°49′29″N 84°51′49″W	Harrodsburg	
44	John McGee House		June 23, 1983 (#83002831)	Jackson Rd. 37°49′48″N 84°52′43″W	Cornishville	Stone house from c.1790 and c.1825
45	Mercer County Jailer's Residence	Mercer County Jailer's Residence	February 9, 1989 (#88003375)	320 S. Chiles St. 37°45′35″N 84°50′42″W	Harrodsburg	
46	Millwood		July 6, 1976 (#76000928)	South of Salvisa off U.S. Route 127; 37°52′57″N 84°52′23″W	Salvisa	
47	Moreland House	Moreland House	February 9, 1989 (#88003371)	Off U.S. Route 68; 37°45′58″N 84°49′47″W	Harrodsburg	
48	Morgan Row	Morgan Row	February 16, 1973 (#73000820)	222, 230, 232 S. Chiles St. 37°45′38″N 84°50′43″W	Harrodsburg	
49	Joseph Morgan House		April 18, 1990 (#88003365)	Moberly Rd. 37°46′48″N 84°51′48″W	Harrodsburg	
50	New Providence Presbyterian Church	New Providence Presbyterian Church	October 10, 1975 (#75000806)	3 miles south of Salvisa on U.S. Route 127; 37°51′53″N 84°51′10″W	Salvisa	
51	North Main Street Historic District	North Main Street Historic District	December 19, 2011 (#11000796)	105-414 N. Main St., 109 W. Lexington, 101 W. Broadway, 163 E. Broadway; 37°45′54″N 84°50′35″W	Harrodsburg	
52	Benjamin Passmore Hotel	Benjamin Passmore Hotel	June 18, 1990 (#88003374)	N. Main St. and Broadway; 37°45′50″N 84°50′36″W	Harrodsburg	
53	Benjamin Passmore House	Benjamin Passmore House	February 8, 1989 (#88003376)	111 W. Broadway; 37°45′49″N 84°50′39″W	Harrodsburg	
54	George Passmore House	George Passmore House	February 9, 1989 (#88003379)	Poplar and Greenville Sts. 37°45′39″N 84°50′32″W	Harrodsburg	
55	Pioneer Memorial State Park	Pioneer Memorial State Park	February 9, 1989 (#88003377)	College Ave. between Lexington and Poplar Sts. 37°45′42″N 84°50′53″W	Harrodsburg	Since renamed to Old Fort Harrod State Park
56	Dr. A.D. Price House	Dr. A.D. Price House	February 9, 1989 (#88003373)	115 W. Poplar St. 37°45′41″N 84°50′39″W	Harrodsburg	
57	Roach-Ison House	Roach-Ison House	February 9, 1989 (#88003352)	Northeast of Harrodsburg off U.S. Route 68; 37°46′13″N 84°49′38″W	Harrodsburg	
58	St. Peter's AME Church	St. Peter's AME Church	February 9, 1989 (#88003381)	Lexington St. and U.S. Route 127; 37°45′46″N 84°50′43″W	Harrodsburg	
59	St. Philip's Episcopal Church	St. Philip's Episcopal Church	January 31, 1978 (#78001389)	Short and Chiles Sts. 37°45′39″N 84°50′40″W	Harrodsburg	
60	Shaker West Lot Farm	Shaker West Lot Farm	June 23, 1983 (#83002832)	Off U.S. Route 68; 37°49′35″N 84°45′18″W	Harrodsburg	
61	Shakertown at Pleasant Hill Historic District	Shakertown at Pleasant Hill Historic District	November 11, 1971 (#71000353)	On U.S. Route 68; 37°49′14″N 84°44′36″W	Pleasant Hill	
62	Shawnee Springs		July 19, 1976 (#76000927)	4 miles northeast of Harrodsburg on Curry Rd. 37°49′01″N 84°48′07″W	Harrodsburg	Destroyed by fire, August of 1982.
63	Smith-Williams House		February 9, 1989 (#88003355)	South of Cane Run Pike; 37°44′57″N 84°47′01″W	Burgin	
64	Stone Quarters on Burgin Road		June 23, 1983 (#83002833)	KY 152; 37°45′40″N 84°49′15″W	Harrodsburg	
65	Sutfield House	Sutfield House	February 9, 1989 (#88003368)	304 N. Main St. 37°45′54″N 84°50′36″W	Harrodsburg	
66	Sutfield-Thompson House	Sutfield-Thompson House	September 13, 1977 (#77000637)	362 N. Main; 37°45′59″N 84°50′36″W	Harrodsburg	
67	Capt. Samuel Taylor House	Capt. Samuel Taylor House	April 13, 1977 (#77000638)	Northeast of Harrodsburg on Chatham Pike; 37°47′56″N 84°45′49″W	Harrodsburg	
68	US Post Office-Harrodsburg	US Post Office-Harrodsburg	March 1, 1989 (#89000019)	105 N. Main St. 37°45′45″N 84°50′35″W	Harrodsburg	
69	Wildwood		February 9, 1989 (#88003366)	388 Curry Pike; 37°48′19″N 84°48′43″W	Harrodsburg	
70	Williams House		June 18, 1990 (#88003351)	Warwick Rd. 37°49′50″N 84°49′35″W	Harrodsburg	
71	Archibald Woods House	Archibald Woods House	October 29, 1983 (#83002834)	129 N. East St. 37°45′46″N 84°50′27″W	Harrodsburg	Still owned by same family that built house on what was originally four-acre tract along south side of Town Creek near site of James Harrod's June 1774 'Big Spring' settlement. Six generations of the Woods family have lived here. Believed to have been modeled after Warren House (ca. 1760) near Smithfield, Surry County, Virginia.

== See also ==
- List of National Historic Landmarks in Kentucky
- National Register of Historic Places listings in Kentucky
