= National Register of Historic Places listings in Pike County, Kentucky =

Location of Pike County in Kentucky

This is a list of the National Register of Historic Places listings in Pike County, Kentucky.

This is intended to be a complete list of the properties and districts on the National Register of Historic Places in Pike County, Kentucky, United States. The locations of National Register properties and districts for which the latitude and longitude coordinates are included below, may be seen in a map.

There are 16 properties and districts listed on the National Register in the county.

This National Park Service list is complete through NPS recent listings posted December 12, 2025.

== Current listings ==
	Name on the Register	Image	Date listed	Location	City or town	Description
1	Chesapeake and Ohio Passenger Depot	Chesapeake and Ohio Passenger Depot	April 23, 1987 (#87000618)	Hellier Ave. 37°28′45″N 82°31′10″W	Pikeville	
2	College Street Historic District	College Street Historic District	September 20, 1984 (#84001913)	Roughly College St. from Elm St. to Huffman Ave. 37°28′37″N 82°31′14″W	Pikeville	
3	Elkhorn City Elementary and High School	Elkhorn City Elementary and High School	March 17, 2015 (#15000085)	551 Russell St. 37°18′01″N 82°21′18″W	Elkhorn City	
4	Fordson Coal Company Buildings	Fordson Coal Company Buildings	September 6, 2002 (#02000917)	1355, 1377, and 1393 Pond Creek Rd. 37°35′05″N 82°16′15″W	Stone	
5	R. T. Greer and Company	R. T. Greer and Company	September 20, 1984 (#84001918)	Auxier St. 37°28′56″N 82°31′08″W	Pikeville	
6	Hatfield-McCoy Feud Historic District	Hatfield-McCoy Feud Historic District	August 5, 1976 (#76000939)	Multiple locations in Pike County; 37°28′45″N 82°31′03″W	Pikeville	
7	Huffman Avenue Historic District	Huffman Avenue Historic District	April 26, 1984 (#84001927)	Huffman Ave. and Main St. 37°28′40″N 82°31′06″W	Pikeville	
8	Odd Fellows Building	Odd Fellows Building	April 26, 1984 (#84001929)	333 2nd St. 37°28′50″N 82°31′05″W	Pikeville	
9	Pauley Bridge	Pauley Bridge	March 26, 1992 (#92000290)	Across the Levisa Fork of the Big Sandy River from Pauley to U.S. Routes 23/460; 37°29′34″N 82°32′08″W	Pikeville	
10	Pikeville College Academy Building	Pikeville College Academy Building	February 16, 1973 (#73000828)	College St. 37°28′33″N 82°31′18″W	Pikeville	
11	Pikeville Commercial Historic District	Pikeville Commercial Historic District	September 20, 1984 (#84001916)	Main St. and Division Ave.; also roughly bounded by Hambley Boulevard, South Auxier Avenue, Main Street, and Huffman Avenue; 37°28′45″N 82°31′04″W	Pikeville	Boundary increase and renaming approved October 25, 2024.
12	Scott Avenue Historic District	Scott Avenue Historic District	September 20, 1984 (#84001931)	Scott Ave., 6th and 7th Sts. 37°29′06″N 82°31′14″W	Pikeville	
13	Stone Historic District	Stone Historic District	December 4, 2003 (#03001226)	Portions of Pond Creek and Hensley Hollow Rds., Baptist, Irick, Eastern and May Sts., and Trout Town Ln. 37°35′16″N 82°16′14″W	Stone	
14	Third Street Historic District	Third Street Historic District	September 20, 1984 (#84001933)	3rd St. and Scott Ave. 37°29′00″N 82°31′02″W	Pikeville	
15	York House	York House	April 26, 1984 (#84001935)	Main St. 37°28′54″N 82°30′57″W	Pikeville	
16	York Mansion	York Mansion	April 26, 1984 (#84001937)	209 Elm St. 37°28′39″N 82°31′22″W	Pikeville	No longer extant.

== See also ==
- List of National Historic Landmarks in Kentucky
- National Register of Historic Places listings in Kentucky
