= College Street Historic District =

College Street Historic District may refer to:

- College Street Historic District (Troy, Alabama)
- College Street Historic District (Harrodsburg, Kentucky)
- College Street Historic District (Pikeville, Kentucky)
- College Street Historic District (Senatobia, Mississippi)
- College Street Historic District (Clinton, North Carolina)
- College Street Historic District (Newberry, South Carolina)
