= Bushtown, Kentucky =

Bushtown, Kentucky may refer to the following places in Kentucky, both in Mercer County:

- Bushtown (east), Kentucky
- Bushtown (west), Kentucky
