= Adams House (Salvisa, Kentucky) =

Historic house in Kentucky, United States

- U.S. National Register of Historic Places
- Location within Kentucky Location within the United States
- Location: Van Arsdell Pike, near Salvisa, Kentucky
- Coordinates: 37°53′01″N 84°55′24″W
- Area: 1.2 acres (0.49 ha)
- Architectural style: Settlement vernacular
- MPS: Mercer County MRA
- NRHP reference No.: 88003357
- Added to NRHP: February 8, 1989

The Adams House in Mercer County, Kentucky, near Salvisa, was listed on the National Register of Historic Places in 1989.

Its architectural style is deemed "settlement vernacular". It was deemed significant, "as an example of the dogtrot house form made of hewn logs. It is also significant for the interior ornamentation of hand painted watermelon pattern on the walls."
