= New Providence Presbyterian Church =

New Providence Presbyterian Church may refer to:

- New Providence Presbyterian Church (Salvisa, Kentucky), listed on the National Register of Historic Places in Mercer County, Kentucky
- New Providence Presbyterian Church (Brownsburg, Virginia), listed on the National Register of Historic Places in Rockbridge County, Virginia
