= USS Halsey Powell =

Fletcher-class destroyer

Coordinates: 41.9670250°N 91.6876830°W

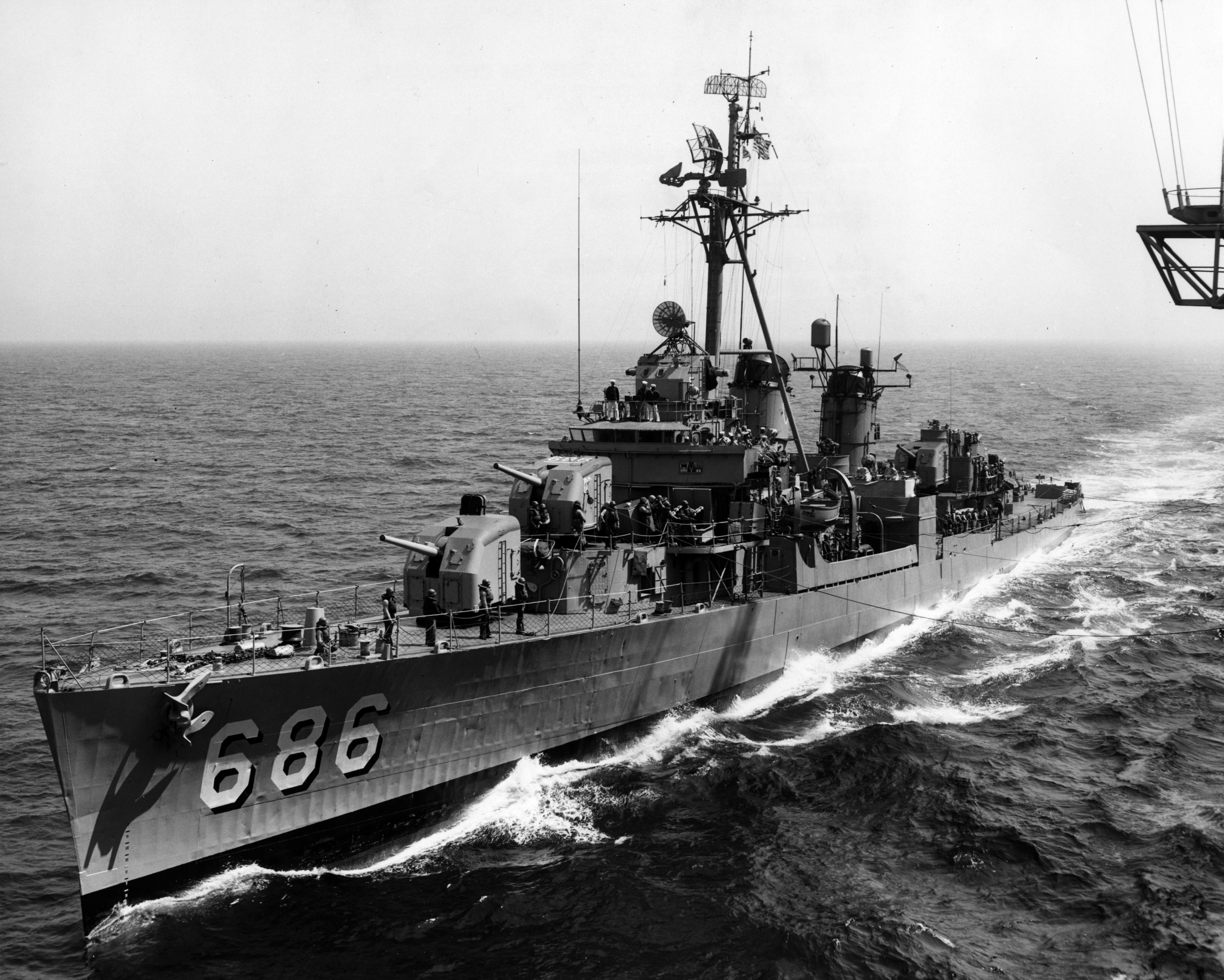
- USS Halsey Powell underway on 23 September 1962

History

United States
- Name: Halsey Powell
- Namesake: Halsey Powell
- Builder: Bethlehem Mariners Harbor
- Laid down: 3 February 1943
- Launched: 30 June 1943
- Sponsored by: Mrs. Halsey Powell
- Commissioned: 25 October 1943
- Decommissioned: 10 December 1946
- Recommissioned: 27 April 1951
- Decommissioned: prior 27 April 1968
- Stricken: 2 June 1975
- Identification: Callsign: NKAF; Hull number: DD-686
- Motto: Have Guns Will Travel
- Honours and awards: See Awards
- Fate: Transferred to South Korea, 27 April 1968
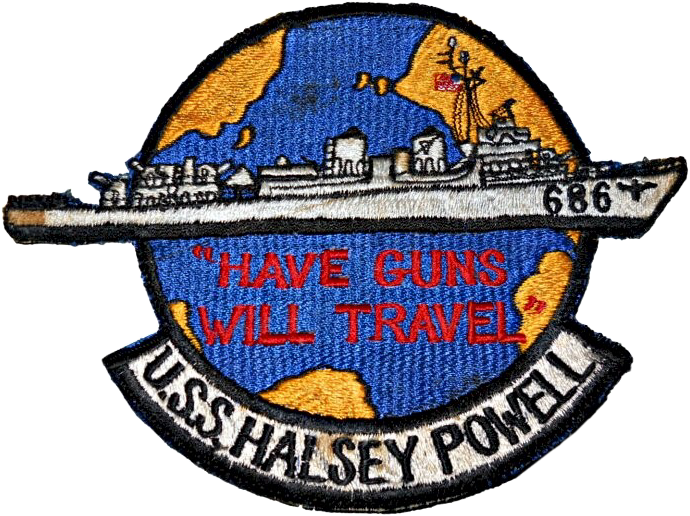
- Badge

South Korea
- Name: Seoul; (서울)
- Namesake: Seoul
- Acquired: 27 April 1968
- Commissioned: 27 April 1968
- Reclassified: DD-912
- Stricken: 1982
- Identification: Hull number: DD-92
- Fate: Scrapped, 1982

General characteristics
- Class & type: Fletcher-class destroyer; Chungmu-class destroyer
- Displacement: 2,050 tons
- Length: 376 ft 6 in (114.76 m)
- Beam: 39 ft 8 in (12.09 m)
- Draft: 17 ft 9 in (5.41 m)
- Propulsion: 60,000 shp (45,000 kW); 2 propellers
- Speed: 35 knots (65 km/h; 40 mph)
- Range: 6,500 nmi (12,000 km) at 15 kn (28 km/h)
- Complement: 336
- Armament: 5 × single Mk 12 5 in (127 mm)/38 guns; 5 × twin 40 mm (1.6 in) Bofors AA guns; 7 × single 20 mm (0.8 in) Oerlikon AA guns; 2 × quintuple 21 in (533 mm) torpedo tubes; 6 × single depth charge throwers; 2 × depth charge racks

USS Halsey Powell (DD-686), was a Fletcher-class destroyer of the United States Navy.

== Namesake ==
Halsey Powell was born on 3 August 1883 in McAfee, Kentucky. He graduated from the United States Naval Academy in 1904, the same year as his cousin future Admiral William "Bull" Halsey. During the next years he served on the battleships USS Kearsarge, USS Illinois and USS Tennessee and studied at the Naval War College. As commander of the USS Parker, he received the Navy Distinguished Service Medal for outstanding performance as a destroyer division commander on convoy duty during World War I, and Britain's Distinguished Service Order for his rescue of the survivors of the torpedoed hospital ship HMHS Glenart Castle. During his command of the USS Edsall he became one of the US Navy officers who played a major role in protecting and evacuating Armenians and Greeks from the September 1922 destruction of Smyrna in Turkey. He rose to the rank of captain and served as an aide to the Secretary of the Navy in 1926, then served as Naval Attaché at Peking from 1927 to 1929. After commanding USS Pittsburgh he was promoted to rear admiral and returned to Washington, D.C., where he died on 24 December 1936. He is buried at Arlington National Cemetery, Virginia.

== Construction and commissioning ==
Halsey Powell was launched by Bethlehem Steel Co., Staten Island, N.Y., on 30 June 1943; sponsored by Mrs. Halsey Powell, widow of Captain Powell; and commissioned on 25 October 1943.

== Service history, United States Navy ==
=== World War II ===
==== 1944 ====
===== Marshalls =====
Halsey Powell conducted her shakedown training off the East Coast, and sailed on 20 January 1944 from Norfolk to join the Pacific Fleet. Arriving Pearl Harbor on 12 February, the destroyer steamed to Majuro to escort tankers back to Hawaii, returning to the Marshall Islands in March for escort and patrol duty. As the islands fell to American amphibious troops, Halsey Powell and other ships protected the task force from air and submarine attack. The destroyer carried out a series of effective attacks on I-32 on 23 March, and after running out of depth charges yielded to Manlove and Canastota to complete the kill.

===== Marianas =====
Following the Marshalls operation, Halsey Powell departed Pearl Harbor on 30 May for rehearsals in connection with the upcoming Marianas invasions. She sortied with the assault force from Eniwetok on 11 June, and as troops stormed ashore on Saipan four days later she took up fire-support station off the beaches, and was an effective force in victory. In addition to screening, radar picket duties, and fire support for ground forces, Halsey Powell sank a net tender, a cargo ship and numerous small craft in the lagoon with her guns.

The operation a success, she entered Saipan harbor on 21 June, after the carrier forces had decimated the Japanese in the Battle of the Philippine Sea. She then steamed to Tinian, bombarding shore positions, clearing the way for troops and screening through the invasion there on 24 July. Following this she spent two weeks on screening and radar picket duty off Guam before returning to Eniwetok on 22 August to join the fast carrier task force.

===== Palau and Taiwan =====
Halsey Powell sortied with Vice Admiral Marc Mitscher's famous Fast Carrier Task Force (then called TF 38), on 29 August. Operating for long periods at sea by underway refueling and replenishment, this powerful carrier force represented the ultimate in mobile striking power afloat. During September the carriers, screened by Halsey Powell and other destroyers, struck the Palaus and the Philippines, returning to Ulithi on 1 October.

Five days later, with Halsey Powell now under command of Cmdr. Sidney D. B. Merrill, the ships sailed on one of the most important operations of the long Pacific war. After air strikes on Okinawa the great task force turned to its real objective, the airfields on Formosa. The air battle raged from 12 to 15 October, with Halsey Powell assisting in the splashing of many Japanese aircraft. At a cost of three damaged ships, the task force had driven off nearly a thousand enemy aircraft, downing over 500.

===== Leyte =====
As the invasion of Leyte began, the desperate Japanese Navy moved with its remaining units into the Philippines. This three-pronged attack, launched almost without air power, precipitated the epochal Battle for Leyte Gulf. Halsey Powell screened Admiral Gerald F. Bogan's carriers during the strikes which made up one phase of the battle, the Battle of the Sibuyan Sea, on 24 October. Battleship Musashi was sunk and Vice Admiral Takeo Kurita's ships were delayed and confused. That night the bulk of TF 38 steamed north to meet another Japanese fleet, and in the Battle off Cape Engaño next day another major victory was won. Halsey Powell picked up downed pilots from 29 to 30 October and returned to Ulithi with the task force on 9 November 1944. During the remainder of 1944 TF 38 carried out heavy strikes against the Philippines and Formosa.

==== 1945 ====
===== Lingayen Gulf =====
The fleet sailed into the South China Sea on 9–15 January to support the Invasion of Lingayen Gulf, and the supporting ships fought off air attacks the carriers struck bases in China and Indochina. With Ticonderoga damaged by a kamikaze on 21 January, Halsey Powell was assigned to escort her to Ulithi, where they arrived on 24 January 1945.

===== Iwo Jima =====
The carrier task force departed again in February to attack Japan itself. Halsey Powell screened the carriers during this attack, in covering attacks for the Iwo Jima invasion on 19 February, and later during more strikes on Japan. The destroyer shot down one attacking aircraft on 16 February and assisted with many others.

===== Okinawa, kamikaze strike =====
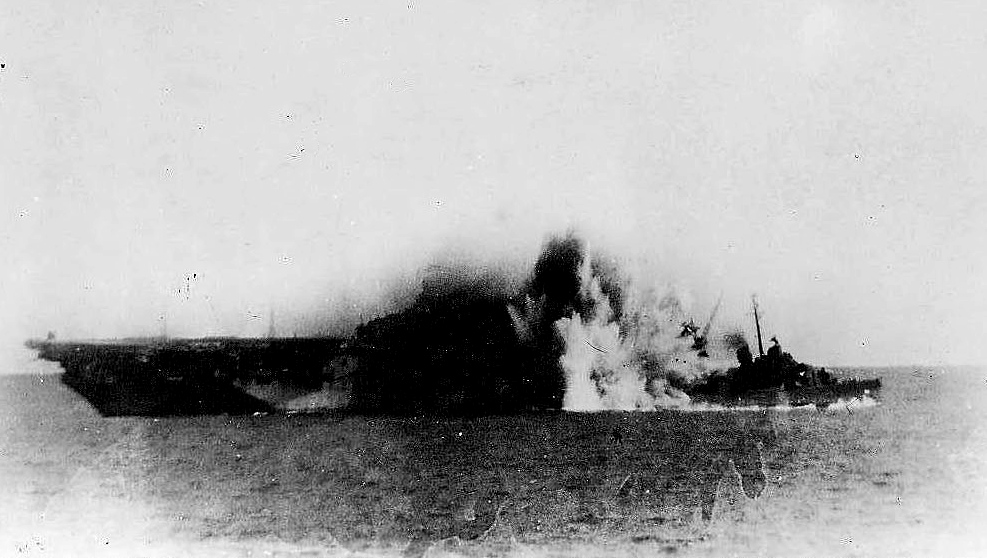
Halsey Powell hit by a kamikaze alongside Hancock, 20 March 1945.

The veteran carrier groups returned on 1 March to Ulithi, but were underway again on 14 March to soften up Okinawa for the coming assault, and to strike more blows at Japan. On 20 March, Halsey Powell was alongside Hancock when Japanese aircraft attacked. As the destroyer was getting clear, the aircraft overshot the carrier and crashed Halsey Powell. Her steering gear jammed, but alert action with the engines averted a collision. Fires were put out, and although 12 were killed and over 30 wounded in the attack the ship reached Ulithi on 25 March.

Halsey Powell arrived at San Pedro for battle repairs on 8 May, but with the Pacific war reaching its climax sailed again for Pearl Harbor on 19 July 1945. She arrived Eniwetok on 17 August, two days after the surrender of Japan, and was present in Tokyo Bay for the formal surrender ceremonies 2 September. The ship then supported the occupation forces until departing 31 October for Puget Sound. Halsey Powell decommissioned on 10 December 1946 at San Diego and was placed in the Pacific Reserve Fleet.

=== Korean War ===
With the increased demands on the Navy as a result of the Korean War, Halsey Powell recommissioned on 27 April 1951. After shakedown and training exercises the ship sailed for the familiar waters of the Far East 23 July from Long Beach, arriving Japan 16 August. Joining Task Force 77, the destroyer acted as plane guard and screening ship while the carrier planes kept up constant pressure on the Communist lines and shore installations. Halsey Powell continued these operations off the eastern coast of Korea until October, when she departed the nearly stabilized war zone for training off Okinawa. Late in the month she returned to take part in destructive bombardments of Suwon Dam, Wonsan, Hungnam, and other areas. Patrolling and screening duties continued until the ship sailed for the United States on 20 February 1952.

Halsey Powell got underway for her second tour in Korea on 4 October 1952, and in the next 7 months took part in shore bombardment and screening duties as United Nations Command naval strength continued to seal off North Korea from the sea. The destroyer returned to the United States 6 May 1953, and after training exercises out of San Diego sailed once more for Japan on 26 December 1953.

Early in 1954 after flight operations with task force 77 off of Korea in the Sea of Japan the Halsey Powell was assigned to Task Force 77.7 in the South China Sea as part of the flight operations off of Vietnam.

=== 1954-1968 ===
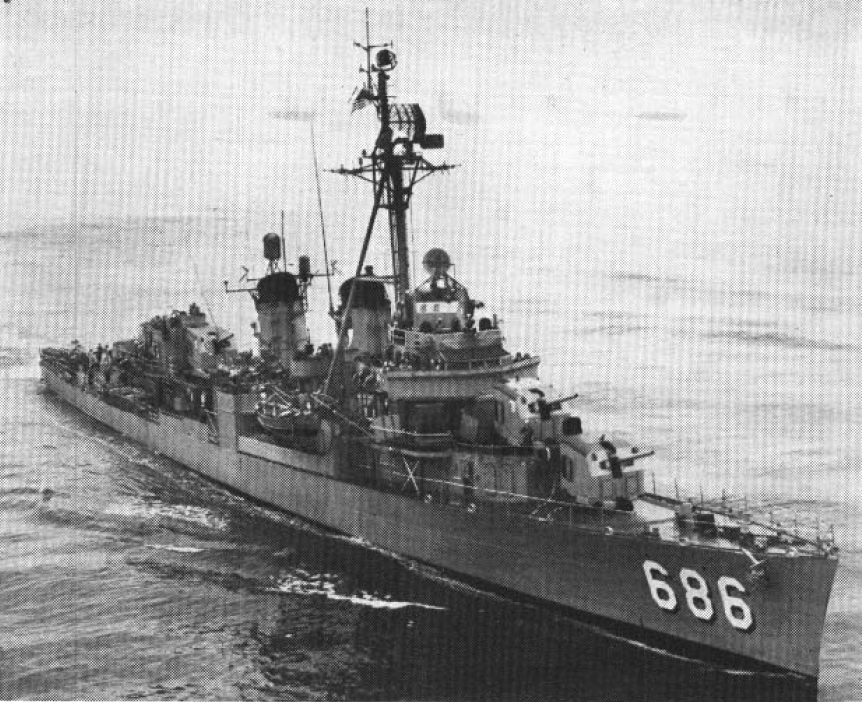
USS Halsey Powell in 1959.

During the next few years Halsey Powell made yearly cruises to the western Pacific, operating with Task Force 77 off Korea, patrolling the Formosa Strait, and engaging in tactical exercises with other units of the Pacific Fleet. In September–October 1958 the ship aided Nationalist Chinese operations in the Quemoy-Matsu crisis, convoying transports and standing by to deter attack by the Communist Chinese. Seapower was a decisive force in checking the spread of communism.

Halsey Powell's trim silhouette became familiar at many far eastern ports. She continued to alternate these important operations with the 7th Fleet with training and readiness exercises off the west coast. In recent years this included practice cruises with NROTC midshipmen. Halsey Powell continued to be an important contributor to peace in the Far East as well as America's readiness at sea. During May–July 1962, the destroyer took part in important nuclear tests in the Pacific, and returned in 1963–1964 to her regular pattern of deployments.

On 1 January 1965, Halsey Powell was assigned to Reserve Destroyer Squadron 27 with Long Beach as her home port. She operated as a Naval Reserve training ship through 1967, cruising between Vancouver, Canada, and Mazatlán, Mexico.

On 27 April 1968, Halsey Powell was transferred to South Korea. She was stricken from the Naval Vessel Register on 2 June 1975.

== Service history, South Korean navy ==
Transferred to South Korea on 27 April 1968, the ex-Halsey Powell was renamed ROKS Seoul (DD-912), after the South Korean capital.

She was stricken and scrapped in 1982.

== Memorial ==
Her anchor is preserved at the Veterans Memorial Park, Iowa.

== Awards ==
Halsey Powell received seven battle stars for her World War II service, and two for the Korean War.
