= ROKS Gimcheon =

Pohang-class corvette

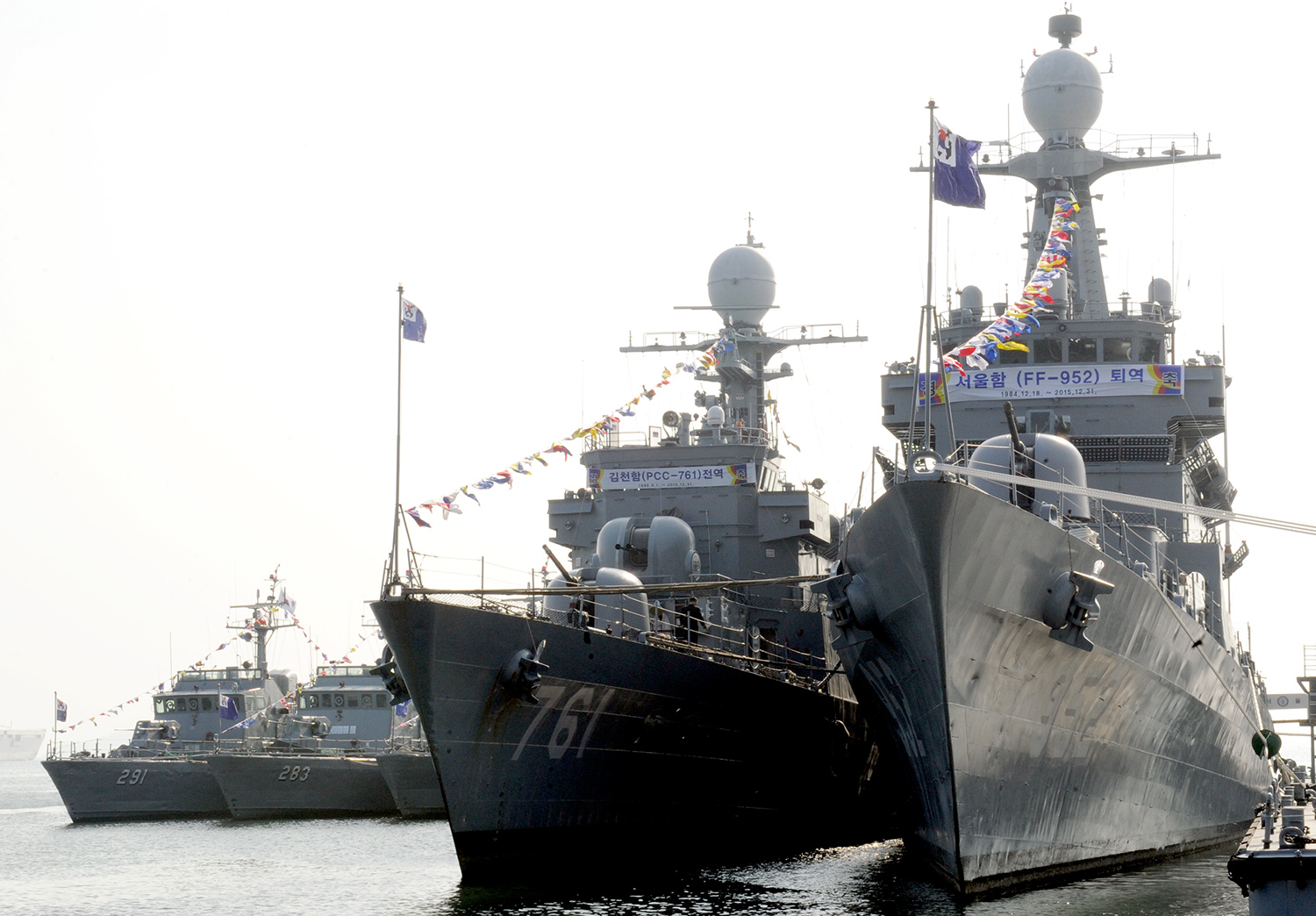
- ROKS Gimcheon alongside ROKS Seoul on 31 December 2015

History

South Korea
- Name: Gimcheon; (김천)
- Namesake: Gimcheon
- Builder: Hanjin, Busan
- Launched: 29 November 1985
- Commissioned: 1 September 1986
- Decommissioned: 31 December 2015
- Identification: Pennant number: PCC-761
- Fate: Transferred to Vietnam People's Navy

Vietnam
- Name: HQ-18
- Acquired: 7 June 2017
- Commissioned: 7 June 2017
- Identification: Hull number: 18
- Status: Active

General characteristics
- Class & type: Pohang-class corvette
- Displacement: 1,220 tons
- Length: 289.7 ft (88 m)
- Beam: 33 ft (10 m)
- Draft: 2.9 ft (0.88 m)
- Installed power: 2 × MTU 6V396 TC52 diesel generators
- Propulsion: Combined diesel or gas (CODOG) arrangement: 2 × MTU 12V956 TB82 diesel engines producing combined total of 6,260 shp (4,670 kW); 1 × General Electric LM2500 PB gas turbines generating 27,820 shp (20,700 kW)
- Speed: 32 knots (59 km/h; 37 mph) maximum
- Range: 4,000 nmi (7,400 km; 4,600 mi) at 15 knots (28 km/h; 17 mph) using diesel engines
- Endurance: 20 days
- Boats & landing craft carried: 2 × RHIB
- Crew: 118
- Sensors & processing systems: X-band & S-band navigational radars; Raytheon AN/SPS-64(V)5B surface search radar; Signaal (Thales Nederland) WM-28 Fire Control System; Signaal (Thales Nederland) LIOD optronic director; Raytheon AN/SQS-58 hull mounted passive/active sonar
- Electronic warfare & decoys: 2 × Loral Hycor Mk 34 RBOC Chaff and Decoy Launching System
- Armament: 2 × Oto Melara 76 mm/62 caliber Compact naval guns; 2 × Otobreda 40 mm L/70 twin naval guns; 2 × Mk 32 triple torpedo tubes; 2 × Mk 9 Depth charge racks; 6 × M2HB Browning .50 caliber machine guns

ROKS Gimcheon (PCC-761) was a Pohang-class corvette of the Republic of Korea Navy and later transferred to Vietnam People's Navy as HQ-18.

== Development and design ==
The Pohang class is a series of corvettes built by different Korean shipbuilding companies. The class consists of 24 ships and some after decommissioning were sold or given to other countries. There are five different types of designs in the class from Flight II to Flight VI.

== Construction and career ==
Gimcheon was launched on 29 November 1985 by Hanjin Heavy Industries in Busan. The vessel was commissioned on 1 September 1986 and decommissioned 31 December 2015. She was transferred to the Vietnam People's Navy. She arrived on 7 June 2017 with a new name HQ-18.

On 10 September 2019, BRP Ramon Alcaraz, HQ-18 and KDB Darulaman participated in AUM X 2019. Darulaman sailed from Brunei to meet HQ-18 off Hon Khoai Island.

== Gallery ==
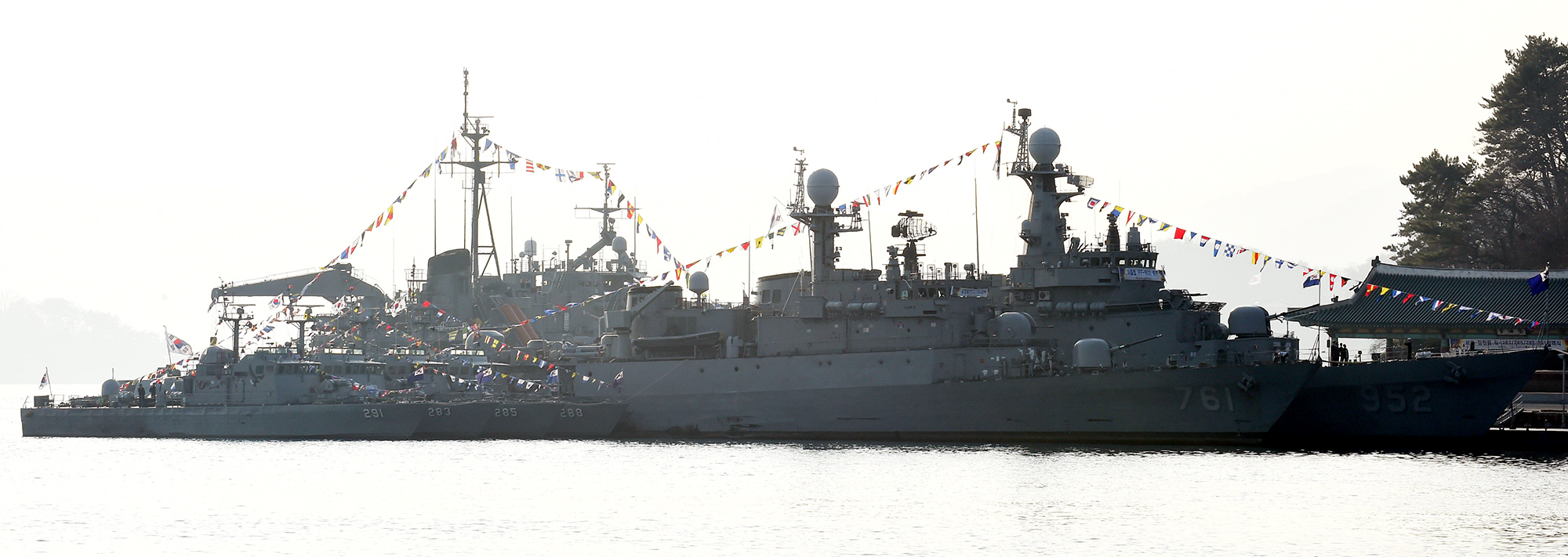
ROKS Gimcheon and ROKS Seoul on 31 December 2015.

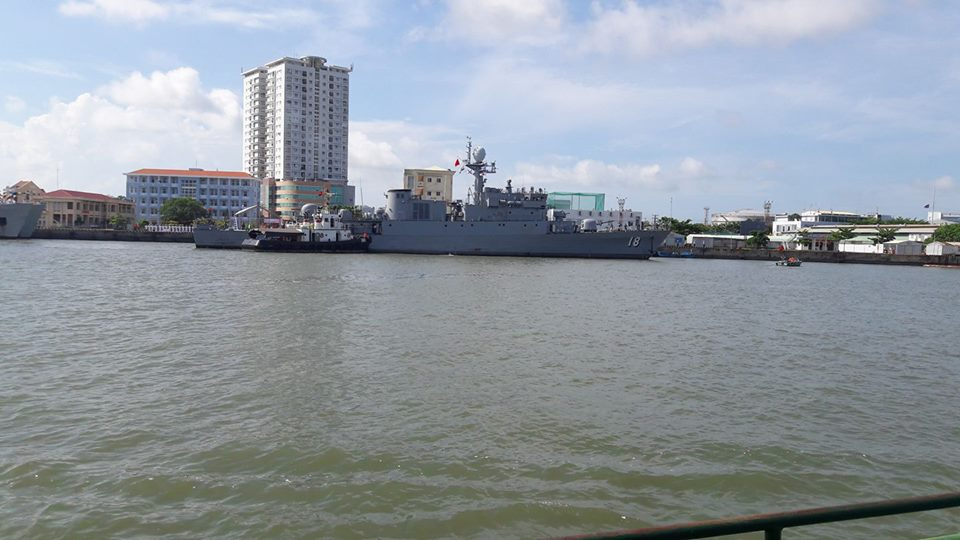
HQ-18 on 2 June 2017.
