= Japanese submarine I-32 =

Type B1 submarine

History

Japan
- Name: Submarine No. 145
- Builder: Sasebo Naval Arsenal, Sasebo, Japan
- Laid down: 20 January 1940
- Renamed: I-39
- Launched: 17 December 1940
- Renamed: I-32 on 1 November 1941
- Completed: 26 April 1942
- Commissioned: 26 April 1942
- Fate: Missing after 23 March 1944; Probably sunk 24 March 1944
- Stricken: 10 June 1944

General characteristics
- Class & type: Type B1 submarine
- Displacement: 2,584 tons surfaced; 3,654 tons submerged
- Length: 108.7 m (357 ft)
- Beam: 9.3 m (31 ft)
- Draft: 5.14 m (16.9 ft)
- Propulsion: 2 diesels: 12,400 hp (9,200 kW); Electric motors: 2,000 hp (1,500 kW)
- Speed: 23.5 knots (43.5 km/h) surfaced; 8 knots (15 km/h) submerged
- Range: 14,000 nautical miles (26,000 km) at 16 knots (30 km/h)
- Test depth: 100 m (330 ft)
- Complement: 94
- Armament: 6 × 533 mm (21 in) forward torpedo tubes; 17 torpedoes; 1 × 14 cm/40 11th Year Type naval gun
- Aircraft carried: 1 Yokosuka E14Y seaplane

I-32 was an Imperial Japanese Navy B1 type submarine. Completed and commissioned in 1942, she served in World War II, operating in the Pacific Ocean and Indian Ocean and supporting Japanese forces in the New Guinea campaign and the Guadalcanal campaign before she was sunk in March 1944.

== Construction and commissioning ==
I-32 was laid down on 20 January 1940 by at the Sasebo Naval Arsenal at Sasebo, Japan, with the name Submarine No. 145. She had been renamed I-39 by the time she was launched on 17 December 1940. Renamed I-32 on 1 November 1941, she was completed and commissioned on 26 April 1942.

== Service history ==
Upon commissioning, I-32 was attached to the Kure Naval District. On 30 May 1942, she was reassigned to Submarine Division 15 in Submarine Squadron 1 in the 6th Fleet. She departed Kure on 16 June 1942 and proceeded to Truk.

=== First war patrol ===
On 30 June 1942, I-32 set out from Truk on her first war patrol, assigned a patrol area off Australia. She conducted a reconnaissance of Port Vila on Efate in the New Hebrides on 9 July 1942 and of New Caledonia between 13 and 15 July 1942. She then passed around the south of Australia. She was in the Indian Ocean 200 nautical miles (370 km; 230 mi) south-southeast of Esperance, Western Australia, on 4 August 1942 when she surfaced at around 19:10 and attacked the Australian armed troop transport Katoomba with gunfire. Katoomba, which was on a voyage from Fremantle, Western Australia, to Adelaide, South Australia, transmitted a distress signal and returned fire while attempting to escape at flank speed. I-32 pursued her for thee hours before giving up the chase, having scored no hits on Katoomba. I-32 concluded her patrol with her arrival on 28 August 1942 at George Town on Penang Island in Japanese-occupied British Malaya. She left Penang on 6 September 1942 and proceeded to Truk, which she reached on 18 September 1942.

=== Second war patrol ===
With a Yokosuka E14Y1 (Allied reporting name "Glen") floatplane embarked, I-32 got underway from Truk on 30 September 1942 to begin her second war patrol and was reassigned to the 2nd Picket Unit day. Her patrol area was in the vicinity of New Caledonia, and she was tasked to launch her plane on 17 October 1942 to make a reconnaissance flight over Nouméa. On 3 October 1942, she was reassigned to the 1st Picket Unit, but she developed a diesel fuel leak soon afterward and received orders to abort her patrol and return to Truk, where she called from 6 to 7 October 1942 before getting back underway bound for Kure, which she reached on 13 October 1942. She underwent repairs at Kure.

=== New Guinea campaign, December 1942–January 1943 ===
With her repairs complete, I-32 left Kure on 4 December 1942 bound for Truk, then got underway from Truk on 14 December 1942 making for Rabaul on New Britain. During her voyage, she was submerged in the Bismarck Sea off the Admiralty Islands on 16 December 1942 when she detected a surfaced Allied submarine at 22:00 and began an approach, but the submarine dived before she could attack. She arrived at Rabaul on 17 December 1942.

Upon arrival at Rabaul, I-32 was assigned to Submarine Group B, and she began a series of supply runs to New Guinea to support Japanese forces fighting in the New Guinea campaign. Carrying a cargo of 22 tons of food and ammunition, she departed Rabaul on her first run on 19 December 1942, arrived off the Mambare River estuary at Buna on the coast of New Guinea on 24 December 1942, got back underway the same day after unloading her cargo, and returned to Rabaul on 26 December 1942. Her second supply run was unsuccessful: She departed Rabaul on 27 December and arrived at the Mambare River on 29 December, but after failing to contact any Japanese forces ashore she headed back to Rabaul, arriving there with her cargo still aboard on 31 December 1942.

I-32 made two more supply runs in January 1943, departing Rabaul on 7 January, arriving off the Mambare River estuary to unload her cargo and embark 43 passengers on 9 January, calling at Rabaul from 11 to 12 January, and returning to the Mambare River on 14 January, where she unloaded 22 tons of food and ammunition. She then headed for Truk, where she arrived on 18 January 1943.

=== Third and fourth war patrols ===
On 24 January 1943, I-32 departed Truk to begin her third war patrol, assigned to a submarine patrol line south of Guadalcanal, where the six-month Guadalcanal campaign was in its final stages. It concluded while I-32 was on patrol, when the Japanese completed Operation Ke, the evacuation of their forces from the island, on 8 February 1943. On 11 February, I-32 sighted a U.S. aircraft carrier steaming eastward, but otherwise her patrol was quiet. She returned to Truk on 22 February 1943.

Assigned to Submarine Group B on 25 March 1943, I-32 departed Truk that day for her fourth war patrol, in which she operated in the vicinity of Fiji and the Samoan Islands. After an uneventful patrol, she returned to Truk on 1 June, then got underway on 3 June bound for Kure, which she reached on 10 June 1943.

=== July–December 1943 ===
Towing an Unkato supply container — a 135-foot (41.1 m) submersible cargo container that could carry up to 377 tons of supplies, designed for a one-way trip in which the cargo's recipients released, recovered, and unloaded it — I-32 departed Kure on 30 July 1943 and set course for Rabaul, arriving there in early August 1943. While at Rabaul, she was reassigned to the Southeast Area Fleet on 9 August 1943. On 5 September 1943, she set out for New Guinea, towing an Unkato container, and she made her first visit to Lae, New Guinea, to deliver supplies. After that, she proceeded to the New Caledonia area, where she attempted to launch her embarked Yokosuka E14Y1 floatplane off Nouméa for a reconnaissance mission on 25 September 1943, but a catapult malfunction forced cancellation of the flight. She next made her way to the waters off Australia's east coast, and she was off Coffs Harbour on the Mid North Coast of New South Wales on 7 October 1943 when she attacked Convoy PG.72, an Australian convoy on a voyage from Sydney in New South Wales to Brisbane in Queensland. All of her torpedoes missed. After sighting one of them surfacing several times between herself and the convoy, one of the convoy's escorts, the Royal Australian Navy corvette HMAS Glenelg, achieved an asdic contact on I-32, but then lost it before she could mount a counterattack against the submarine.

Reassigned to Submarine Group B on 19 October 1943, I-32 received an order on 20 October to attempt another reconnaissance flight over Nouméa, but this order later was cancelled. Instead, she was detached from Submarine Group B on 26 October 1943 and ordered to join other submarines in intercepting a convoy of six U.S. Navy fleet oilers that the submarine I-36 had sighted, but the interception effort was unsuccessful. She next received orders to reconnoiter Pago Pago on Tutuila in American Samoa and conducted a periscope reconnaissance of the anchorage there on 7 November 1943. She suffered a diesel engine breakdown on 12 November and on 13 November 1943 was ordered back to Truk, which she reached safely.

Departing Truk on 24 November 1943, I-32 called at Kwajalein from 27 November to 5 December 1943. She returned to Truk on 8 December 1943, took aboard torpedoes from the auxiliary submarine tender Heian Maru on 10 December, then put to sea on 14 December 1943 bound for Japan, where she arrived at Kure on 20 December 1943 for an overhaul.

=== February–March 1944 ===
With her overhaul complete, I-32 departed Kure on 28 February 1944 bound for Truk, which she reached on 8 March 1944. During her stay in Japan, American forces had captured Kwajalein, Majuro, and Eniwetok in the Marshall Islands, leaving some bypassed Japanese garrisons in the islands isolated. On 15 March 1944, I-32 departed Truk on a run to carry supplies to the isolated garrison on Wotje Atoll, with orders to follow delivery of the supplies with an anti-shipping patrol in the Pacific Ocean east of the Marshalls. During her voyage to Wotje, she reported sighting an American carrier plane 200 nautical miles (370 km; 230 mi) south-southwest of Kusaie at 14:30 Japan Standard Time on 17 March 1944, and on 23 March 1944 at 22:21 Japan Time she reported sighting an Allied task force. It was the last time that the Japanese ever heard from I-32.

=== Loss ===
Fleet Radio Unit Pacific, a U.S. Navy signals intelligence and cryptanalysis organization in Hawaii, intercepted and decrypted I-32′s 23 March 1944 message. Based on the information, a U.S. Navy hunter-killer group made up of the destroyer USS Halsey Powell (DD-686), the destroyer escort USS Manlove (DE-36), and the submarine chaser USS PC-1135 rendezvoused at Erikub Atoll and set out to intercept I-32.

At 04:22 on 24 March 1944, Manlove detected a surfaced submarine 50 nautical miles (93 km; 58 mi) south of Wotje on radar at a range of 5 nautical miles (9.3 km; 5.8 mi). Manlove closed with the submarine, which submerged when she was 3,000 yards (2,700 m) away, causing Manlove to lose radar contact. Manlove quickly gained sonar contact on the submarine, however, and Halsey Powell moved in, expending all of her depth charges in a series of attacks. Manlove and PC-1135 then attacked, Manlove dropping depth charges and firing Hedgehog salvos and PC-1135 attacking with Mousetrap projectiles. The submarine sank at 08°30′N 170°10′E.

The submarine Halsey Powell, Manlove, and PC-1135 sank probably was I-32. On 24 March 1944, the Imperial Japanese Navy declared her to be presumed lost with all hands. She was stricken from the Navy list on 10 June 1944.

== Sources ==
- Hackett, Bob & Kingsepp, Sander. IJN Submarine I-32: Tabular Record of Movement. Retrieved on August 29, 2020.
- Milanovich, Kathrin (2021). "The IJN Submarines of the I 15 Class". In Jordan, John (ed.). Warship 2021. Oxford, UK: Osprey Publishing. pp. 29–43. ISBN 978-1-4728-4779-9.
