= Mayo, Kentucky =

Unincorporated community in Kentucky, United States

- Unincorporated community
- Location within Kentucky
- Coordinates: 37°52′18″N 84°55′30″W
- Country: United States
- State: Kentucky
- County: Mercer
- Elevation: 896 ft (273 m)
- Time zone: UTC-5 (Eastern (EST))
  - Summer (DST): UTC-4 (EDT)
- Area code: 859
- GNIS feature ID: 507313

Mayo is an unincorporated community in Mercer County, Kentucky, United States. Mayo is located on Kentucky Route 1160, 8.8 miles (14.2 km) north-northwest of Harrodsburg.
