= John McGee House =

- U.S. National Register of Historic Places
- Location within Kentucky
- Nearest city: Cornishville, Kentucky
- Coordinates: 37°49′48″N 84°52′43″W
- Area: 0.7 acres (0.28 ha)
- Built: c.1790, c.1825
- Built by: John McGee
- Architectural style: Federal
- MPS: Early Stone Buildings of Central Kentucky TR
- NRHP reference No.: 83002831
- Added to NRHP: June 23, 1983

The John McGee House, near Cornishville, Kentucky, United States, was built around 1790. It was listed on the National Register of Historic Places in 1983.

It is a two-story hall parlor plan dry stone house with two bays on its second floor and three bays on its first. It was built by American Revolutionary War soldier John McGee (b. 1730) who moved to Kentucky in 1775. He owned 1,000 acres (4.0 km^{2}).

It is a "good example" of an "early stone house". A one-story ell was added around 1825.

It includes some element of Federal style.

A second contributing building is a "dairy", which is a root cellar with a granary above.
