= ROKS Seoul =

ROKS Seoul is the name of three Republic of Korea Navy warships:

- ROKS Seoul (LCI-101), a landing craft infantry commissioned as USS LCI(L)-594 in 1944, and acquired 15 September 1946
- ROKS Seoul (DD-912), a Fletcher-class destroyer commissioned as USS Halsey Powell in 1943, and acquired 1968
- ROKS Seoul (FF-952), an Ulsan-class frigate commissioned on 14 December 1985
