= Talmage, Kentucky =

Unincorporated community in Kentucky, United States

- Unincorporated community
- Location within Kentucky
- Coordinates: 37°51′03″N 84°52′10″W
- Country: United States
- State: Kentucky
- County: Mercer
- Elevation: 823 ft (251 m)
- Time zone: UTC-5 (Eastern (EST))
  - Summer (DST): UTC-4 (EDT)
- Area code: 859
- GNIS feature ID: 504928

Talmage is an unincorporated community in Mercer County, Kentucky, United States. Talmage is located on Kentucky Route 1160, 6.3 miles (10.1 km) north-northwest of Harrodsburg.
