= Baldin House =

- U.S. National Register of Historic Places
- Location within Kentucky Location within the United States
- Location: Ebenezer Rd., south of Ebeneezer, Kentucky, United States
- Coordinates: 37°52′32″N 84°48′57″W
- Area: 1.1 acres (0.45 ha)
- Built: 1850
- Architectural style: Gothic Revival
- MPS: Mercer County MRA
- NRHP reference No.: 88003349
- Added to NRHP: February 8, 1989

The Baldin House, near Ebeneezer, Kentucky, United States, was built in c.1850. It was listed on the National Register of Historic Places in 1989.

It is a two-story, three-bay structure with a Gothic Revival-style gabled roofline.

It was deemed significant "as an example of how Mercer County builders interpreted the Gothic Revival style in their choice of a steeply pitched roof, bargeboards on the eaves, and central wall gable to ornament a single-pile, central passage plan with an ell."
