= James Franklin Record =

American college president

- Born: June 21, 1861; Crawford County, Pennsylvania, U.S.
- Died: May 26, 1935 (aged 73); Danville, Kentucky, U.S.
- Education: Edinboro State Normal School
- Occupations: College president, educator, and pastor
- Employer: Pikeville College

James Franklin Record (June 21, 1861 – 1935) was a pastor, school teacher, and president of the Pikeville Collegiate Institute, and later Pikeville College.

== Early life ==
Record was born to Mary Hetty Wyman Record and James Elliot Record in Crawford County, Pennsylvania. He had seven brothers and five sisters.

Record attended the country school until high school, and he began teaching about this time. He taught during the winter terms and attended Cochranton High School in Cochranton, Pennsylvania during the fall and spring terms. After high school, Record attended Edinboro State Normal School. While a student there, he taught at Geneva, Pennsylvania and Deckard's run. He also became principal of a two-room public school in Geneva.

After teaching Geneva for a year and before completing his degree at the Normal School, Record went to Minnesota at the request of a friend who was a county Superintendent of schools. He spent one spring and summer there before returning to Pennsylvania to be principal of the high school in Cooperstown, Pennsylvania.

In December 1885, Record married Margaret E. Bell. They had a son and two daughters.

After finishing up at Cooperstown in May, Record and his wife spent six weeks in Edinboro, returning to Cooperstown that following September. Record secured a position at Deckard's Run the next year. Record and his wife did some religious work in Minnesota and Pennsylvania. The family lived at Cooperstown for less than two years before Record became pastor in Kasota, Minnesota.

== Pikeville College years ==
On a visit to North Dakota for a job interview, Record met Dr. Fulton, a member of the Board of Trustees of Pikeville Collegiate Institute in Pikeville, Kentucky. As a result of that meeting, Record accepted the pastorate of the First Presbyterian Church of Pikeville and the principalship of the Pikeville Collegiate Institute in 1899.

During the summer of 1905, Record received a Ph.D. degree. He taught the science of government, psychology, and mathematics at the institute. During Record's first term at Pikeville, he established a training school for teachers, built a women's dormitory, and organized the school's first alumni group. In 1909, the School Catalogue reflected the name change to Pikeville College.

In 1911, Record became the Educational Superintendent of the Sabbath School, run by the Presbyterian Church in Michigan. In 1915, Record resumed his post as president of Pikeville. During this term, the college gymnasium opened, the first basketball game was played, the first junior college graduation was held, the administration building opened, and the Wickham Hall opened.

Record retired from Pikeville in 1934 due to the declining health of his wife, receiving the title of president emeritus. The couple lived with their daughter Alice in Danville, Kentucky. In 1935, he died of a heart attack while teaching a Sunday school class at Second Presbyterian Church in Danville.

== Legacy and honors ==
In 1962, Pikeville College dedicated Record Memorial Hall in his memory.

Record is best remembered for his faith in Pikeville College and its growth and role in education in Pike County, Kentucky. Under his leadership, the struggling private high school became an accredited high school and accredited junior college. His influence in the local public schools was widespread and extended to several mountain counties. He was said to have inspired many local youth to become teachers.
