= Benjamin Daniel House =

Historic house in Kentucky, United States

- U.S. National Register of Historic Places
- Location: NE of Harrodsburg off KY 68, Harrodsburg, Kentucky
- Coordinates: 37°50′43″N 84°44′22″W
- Area: 0.3 acres (0.12 ha)
- Built: c.1800
- NRHP reference No.: 83002827
- Added to NRHP: August 2, 1983

The Benjamin Daniel House, located on Canaan Land Farm in Mercer County, Kentucky northeast of Harrodsburg, about .75 miles (1.21 km) off U.S. Route 68, was listed on the National Register of Historic Places in 1983. The listing included four contributing buildings.

The house is a brick one-and-a-half-story three-bay hall-parlor plan house which was built around 1800. Its brick on north and south walls is laid in Flemish bond. Accompanying the house are a smokehouse and two sheds.
