= College Street Historic District (Pikeville, Kentucky) =

- U.S. National Register of Historic Places
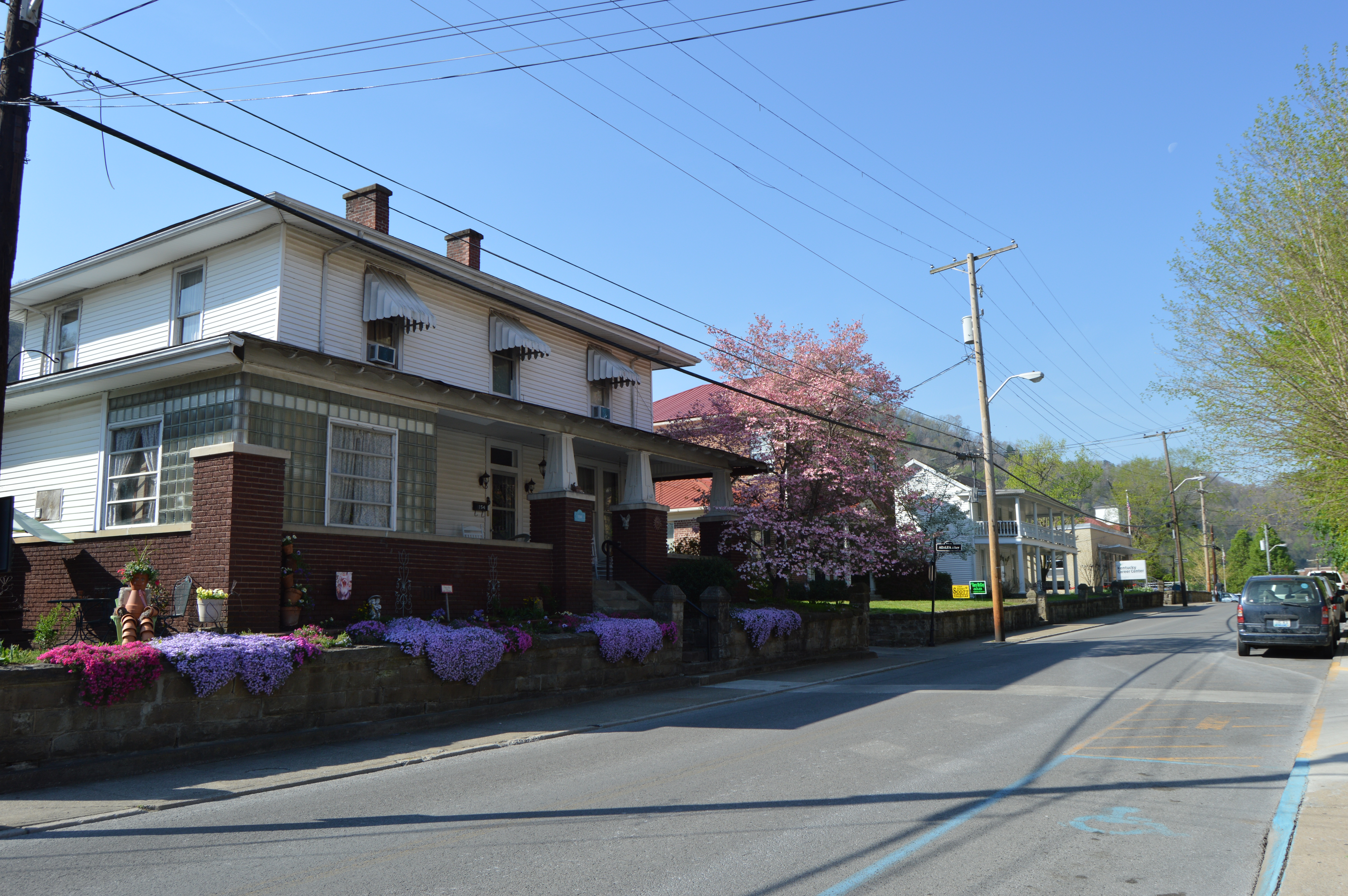

- Location within Kentucky Location within the United States
- Location: Roughly College St. from Elm St. to Huffman Ave., Pikeville, Kentucky
- Coordinates: 37°28′37″N 82°31′14″W
- Area: 1 acre (0.40 ha)
- Architectural style: Classical Revival, American Four Square
- MPS: Pikeville MRA
- NRHP reference No.: 84001913
- Added to NRHP: September 20, 1984

The College Street Historic District in Pikeville, Kentucky is a historic district which was listed on the National Register of Historic Places in 1984. The listing included nine residences as contributing buildings adjacent to the University of Pikeville.

It is located between, and connected, the Huffman Avenue Historic District, also NRHP-listed in 1984, and the Pikeville College Academy Building which was already listed on the National Register (in 1973).

It includes:

- Yost House, 218 College St.
- 222 College St.
- Methodist Parsonage, 228 College St., an American Foursquare
- Kate Dils Thornberry Hatcher House, 229 College St., home of woman who opened perhaps the first woman-run business in Pikeville, a hat shop
- 227 College St. (1910)
- 223 College St., an American Foursquare
- Johnson House, 219 College St., an American Foursquare
