= Beaumont Avenue Residential District =

Historic district in Kentucky, United States

- U.S. National Register of Historic Places
- U.S. Historic district
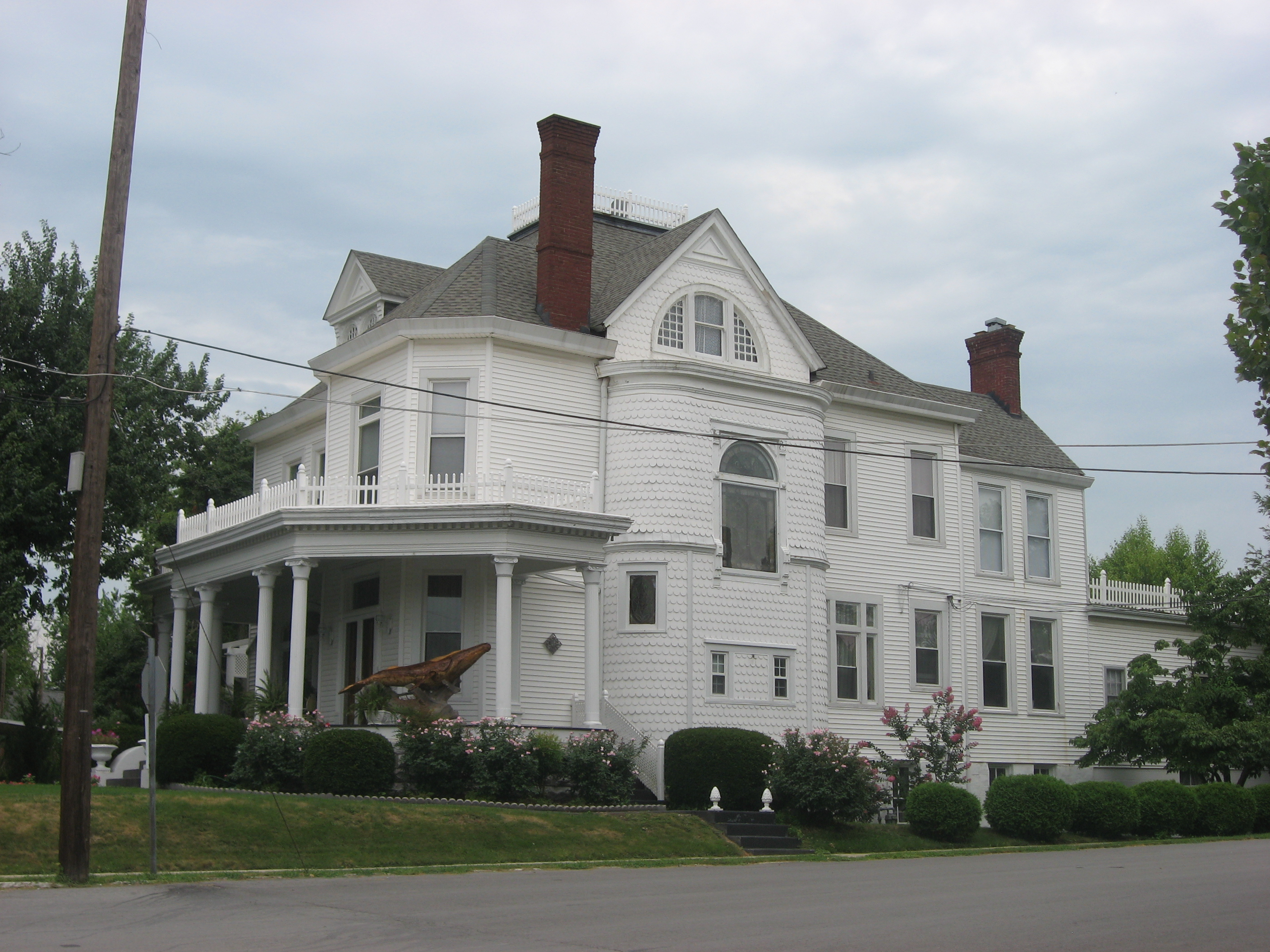

- Location within Kentucky Location within the United States
- Location: 338-538 Beaumont Ave., Harrodsburg, Kentucky
- Coordinates: 37°45′24″N 84°50′36″W
- Area: 5.7 acres (2.3 ha)
- Architectural style: Queen Anne, Classical Revival
- MPS: Mercer County MRA
- NRHP reference No.: 88003359
- Added to NRHP: February 8, 1989

Beaumont Avenue Residential District is a 5.7 acres (2.3 ha) historic district in Harrodsburg, Kentucky, which was listed on the National Register of Historic Places in 1989.

It includes properties along Beaumont Avenue from number 338 to number 538. It included 14 contributing buildings and two non-contributing buildings, all being residences. The oldest house is the Magoffin-Gaither House, at 464 Beaumont Avenue, built in 1850.
