= McAfee, Kentucky =

Unincorporated community in Kentucky, United States

McAfee
- Unincorporated community
- Location within the state of Kentucky McAfee (the United States)
- Coordinates: 37°51′02″N 84°51′07″W
- Country: United States
- State: Kentucky
- County: Mercer
- Elevation: 876 ft (267 m)
- Time zone: UTC-5 (Eastern (EST))
  - Summer (DST): UTC-4 (EDT)
- GNIS feature ID: 497759

McAfee is an unincorporated community located in Mercer County, Kentucky, United States. Its post office is closed. It was also called Chaplin.

== See also ==
- National Register of Historic Places listings in Mercer County, Kentucky
