= College Street Historic District (Harrodsburg, Kentucky) =

Historic district in Kentucky, United States

- U.S. National Register of Historic Places
- U.S. Historic district
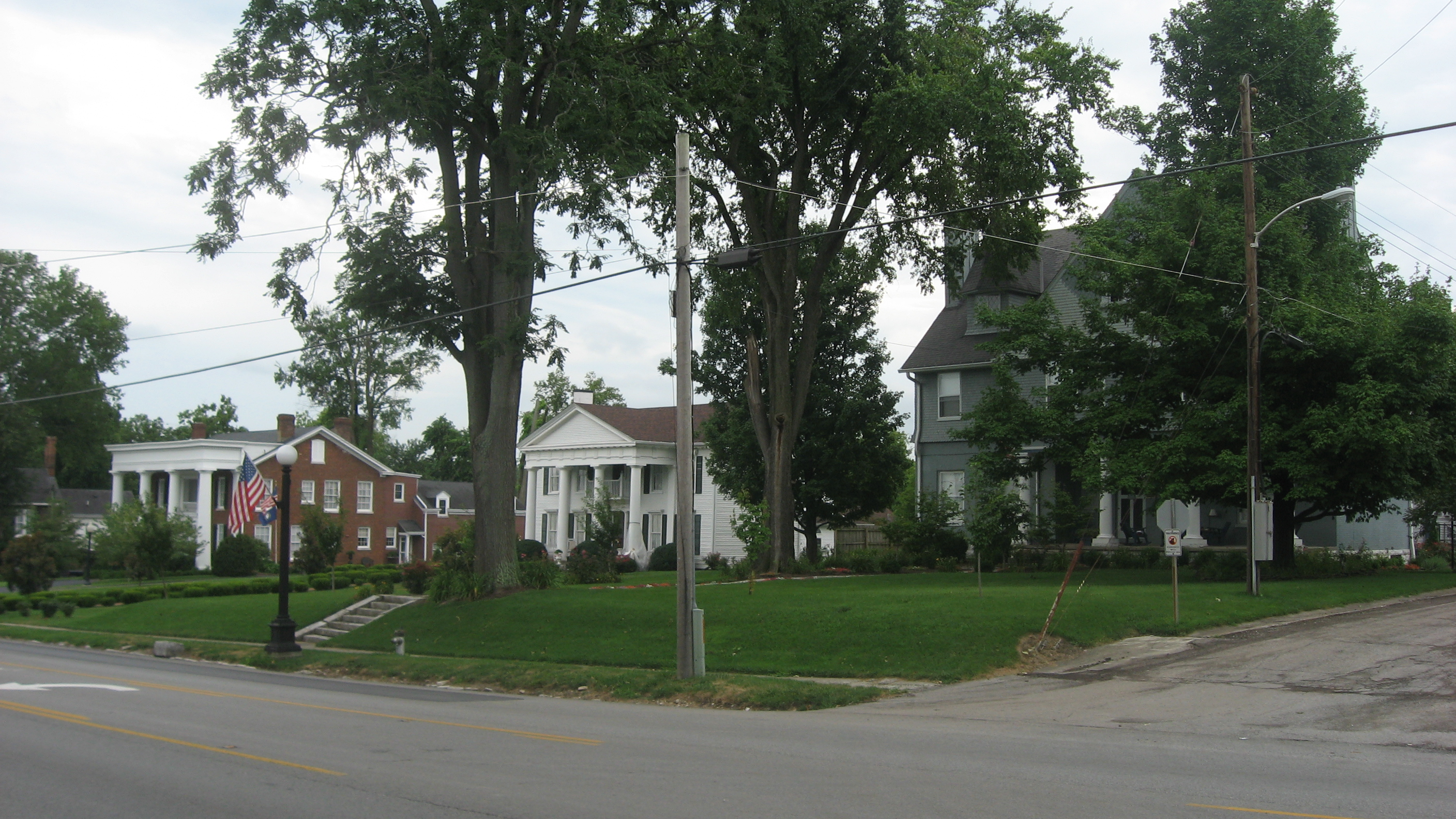
- Location: College Street from North Lane to Factory Street, Harrodsburg, Kentucky
- Coordinates: 37°45′59″N 84°50′43″W
- Area: 8.5 acres (3.4 ha)
- Architectural style: Bungalow/craftsman, Greek Revival, Queen Anne
- NRHP reference No.: 79001023
- Added to NRHP: February 9, 1979

The College Street Historic District in Harrodsburg in Mercer County, Kentucky was listed on the National Register of Historic Places in 1979. The 8.5 acres (3.4 ha) along College Street from North Lane to Factory Street, includes 27 contributing buildings.

It was deemed significant as "an uninterrupted concentration of 19th- and early-20th-century buildings that line a significant street in Harrodsburg, the oldest permanent settlement in Kentucky. American architectural evolution is well represented in this diverse collection, but the most visually prominent style is the Greek Revival a style that flourished and gained wide acceptance in Harrodsburg and Mercer County."

It includes Doricham, at 409 North College Street, which was separately listed on the National Register in 1976.
