= Ebenezer, Mercer County, Kentucky =

Unincorporated community in Kentucky, United States

Ebenezer
- Unincorporated community
- Location within the state of Kentucky Ebenezer (the United States)
- Coordinates: 37°52′47″N 84°48′54″W
- Country: United States
- State: Kentucky
- County: Mercer
- Elevation: 827 ft (252 m)
- Time zone: UTC-5 (Eastern (EST))
  - Summer (DST): UTC-4 (EDT)
- GNIS feature ID: 491533

Ebenezer is an unincorporated community located in Mercer County, Kentucky, United States. Its post office is closed.
