= Bushtown (west), Kentucky =

Unincorporated community in Kentucky, United States

Bushtown, Kentucky
- Unincorporated community
- Location within Kentucky
- Coordinates: 37°46′05″N 84°59′34″W
- Country: United States
- State: Kentucky
- County: Mercer
- Elevation: 876 ft (267 m)
- Time zone: UTC-5 (Eastern (EST))
  - Summer (DST): UTC-4 (EDT)
- Area code: 859
- GNIS feature ID: 507628

Bushtown is an unincorporated community in Mercer County, Kentucky, United States. Bushtown is located on Kentucky Route 1941, 8.2 miles (13.2 km) west of Harrodsburg.
