= Boise House =

- U.S. National Register of Historic Places
- Location within Kentucky Location within the United States
- Location: Bohon Rd. east of Salt River, near Harrodsburg, Kentucky
- Coordinates: 37°48′11″N 84°52′40″W
- Area: 0.8 acres (0.32 ha)
- Built: 1817
- Architectural style: Federal
- MPS: Mercer County MRA
- NRHP reference No.: 88003356
- Added to NRHP: February 8, 1989

Boise House, near Harrodsburg, Kentucky, was built in 1817. It was listed on the National Register of Historic Places in 1989.

It is a one-and-a-half-story brick residence, with brick laid in Flemish bond. It includes Federal architecture.
