= Bushtown (east), Kentucky =

Unincorporated community in Kentucky, United States

Bushtown, Kentucky
- Unincorporated community
- Location within Kentucky
- Coordinates: 37°43′50″N 84°43′45″W
- Country: United States
- State: Kentucky
- County: Mercer
- Elevation: 869 ft (265 m)
- Time zone: UTC-5 (Eastern (EST))
  - Summer (DST): UTC-4 (EDT)
- Area code: 859
- GNIS feature ID: 507627

Bushtown is an unincorporated community in Mercer County, Kentucky, United States. Bushtown is located on the Dix River 6.6 miles (10.6 km) east-southeast of Harrodsburg.
