= New Providence Presbyterian Church (Salvisa, Kentucky) =

Historic church in Kentucky, United States

- U.S. National Register of Historic Places
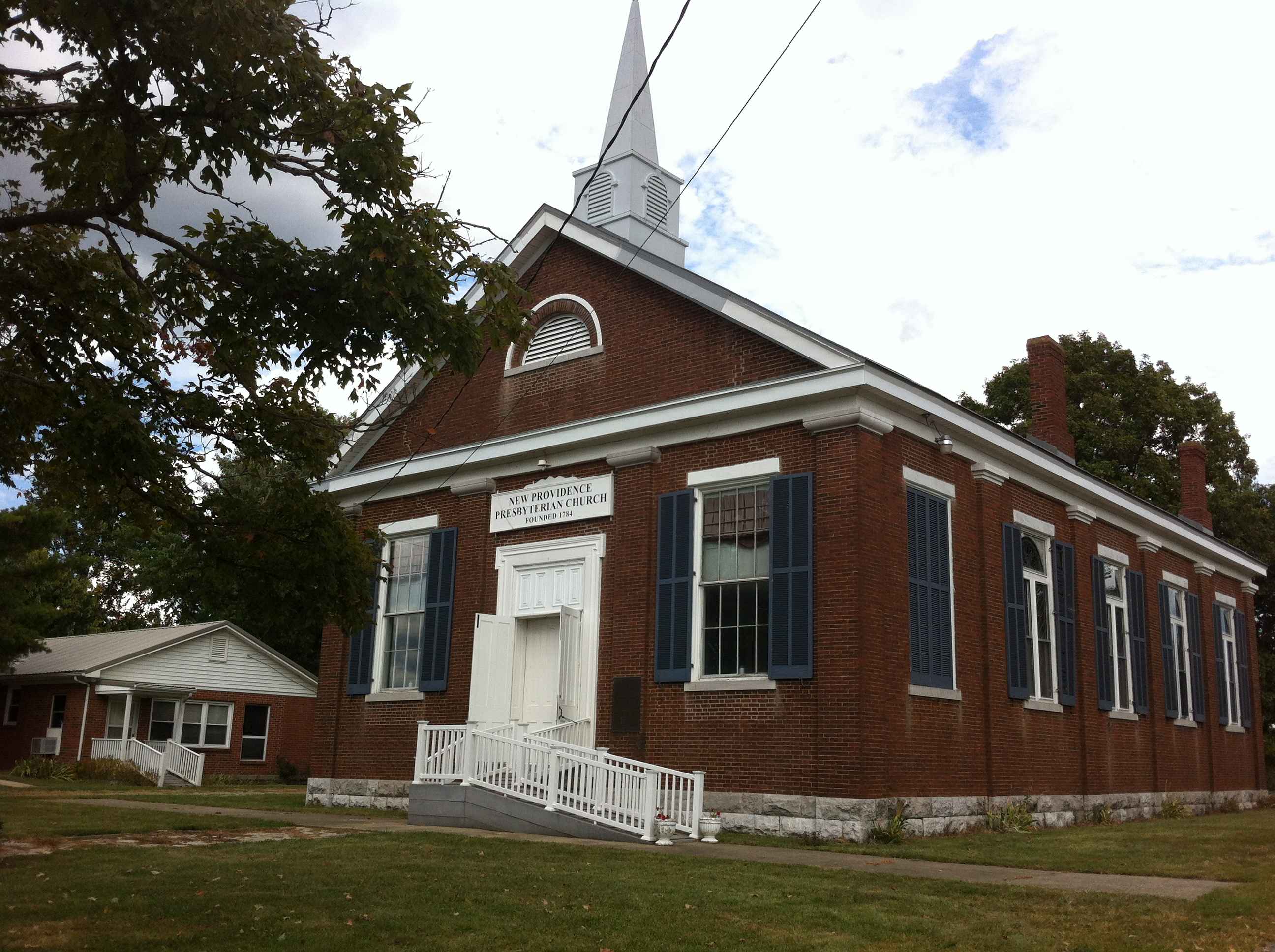

- Location within Kentucky Location within the United States
- Nearest city: Salvisa, Kentucky
- Coordinates: 37°51′53″N 84°51′10″W
- Area: 1 acre (0.40 ha)
- Built: 1862-65
- Architectural style: Greek Revival
- NRHP reference No.: 75000806
- Added to NRHP: October 10, 1975

The New Providence Presbyterian Church near Salvisa, Kentucky is a historic Greek Revival-style church built between 1862 and 1865. It was added to the National Register of Historic Places in 1975.

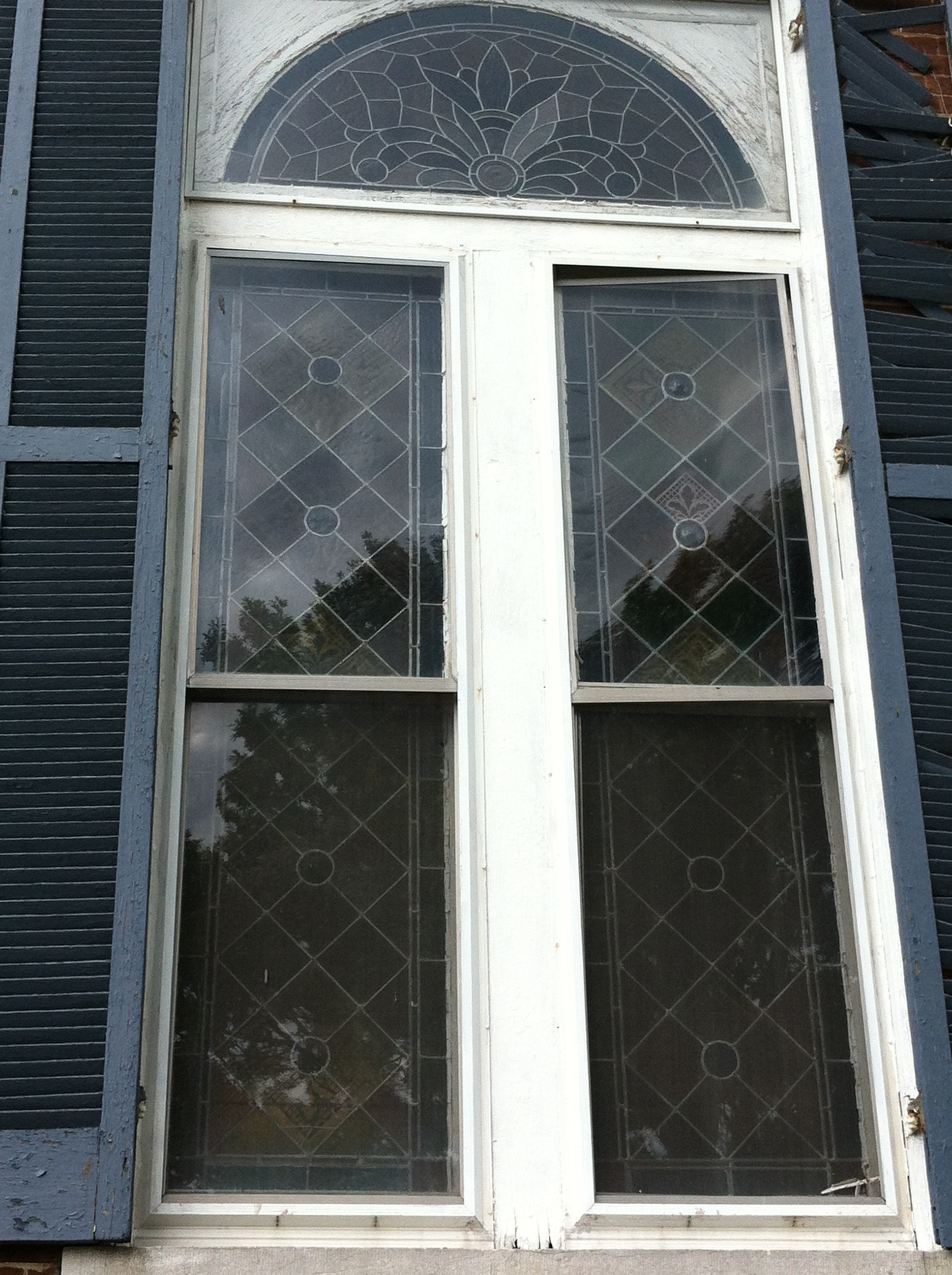
Detail of the church's stained glass windows

It is located 3 miles (4.8 km) south of Salvisa on U.S. Route 127, on the route of the Old Wilderness Road.

The church is one of the oldest Presbyterian churches in Kentucky. It was organized in 1785 and was one of the founding churches of the Transylvania Presbytery in 1786.
