= University of Pikeville =

Presbyterian university in Pikeville, Kentucky, US

Coordinates: 37.47910°N 82.52119°W

- Former names: Pikeville Collegiate Institute (1889–1909); Pikeville College (1909–2011)
- Motto: "The Leading University of Central Appalachia"
- Type: Private university
- Established: 1889; 137 years ago
- Accreditation: SACS
- Religious affiliation: Presbyterian
- Academic affiliations: Space-grant
- Chancellor: Paul E. Patton
- President: Burton Webb
- Students: 2,547 (fall 2024)
- Undergraduates: 1,540 (fall 2024)
- Postgraduates: 1,007 (fall 2024)
- Location: Pikeville, Kentucky, United States
- Campus: 500 acres (2.0 km^{2}); Remote town
- Newspaper: The Bear Facts
- Colors: Orange and black
- Nickname: Bears & Lady Bears
- Sporting affiliations: NAIA – Appalachian
- Mascot: Pikey the Bear
- Website: upike.edu
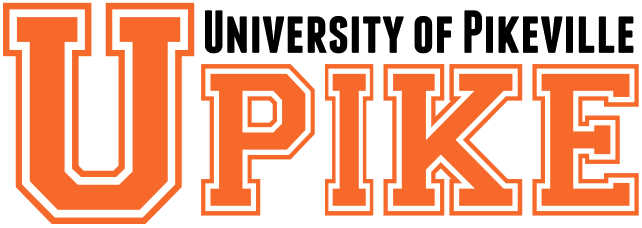

The University of Pikeville (UPIKE) is a private university affiliated with the Presbyterian Church (USA) and located in Pikeville, Kentucky, United States. It was founded in 1889 by the Presbyterian Church and is located on a 25-acre (10 ha) campus on a hillside overlooking downtown Pikeville.

The university is home to the Kentucky College of Osteopathic Medicine, one of three medical schools in the state of Kentucky. The university confers associate, bachelor's, master's and doctorate degrees through its six academic divisions and one medical college; enrollment was 2,366 students in fall 2016.

== History ==
The university was founded in 1889 by the Presbyterian Church as the Pikeville Collegiate Institute. It operated on the primary, secondary, and post-secondary levels, though its "college" offerings were not accredited and did not lead to a degree. Under the leadership of James Franklin Record, who was president of the school from 1899 to 1932, the high school was accredited, opened a teacher training institute, and expanded to include a junior college.

In 1909, the school was split into the Pikeville College Academy—a private school at the primary and secondary levels—and Pikeville College, which as an accredited junior college, offered the first two years with the expectation that students would transfer to another Presbyterian college for a higher degree. In 1955, the school became a degree-granting four-year college in its own right, and in 1957, the academy closed.

In 1997, the Pikeville College School of Osteopathic Medicine—now the University of Pikeville Kentucky College of Osteopathic Medicine—was established. This makes the college one of the smallest post-secondary institutions in the United States to have a medical school.

The purpose of the osteopathic medical school—though graduates are prepared to pursue further training in any medical specialty—is to train primary care physicians to fill the shortage of healthcare providers in Appalachia. Student recruitment is focused almost exclusively on students with a rural Appalachian background. It is one of 29 osteopathic colleges in the United States, and one of five in Appalachia. (Note: The other osteopathic colleges in Appalachia are located at Edward Via Virginia College of Osteopathic Medicine (Blacksburg, Virginia), Lincoln Memorial University (Harrogate, Tennessee), Ohio University (Athens, Ohio) and West Virginia School of Osteopathic Medicine (Lewisburg, West Virginia).)

On July 1, 2011, the school officially changed its name from "Pikeville College" to the "University of Pikeville". Late in the same year, voices were raised in the Kentucky General Assembly in favor of converting the university into a state-supported school. By the end of the following March, proponents abandoned their plans after deeming them politically impossible.

== Campus ==
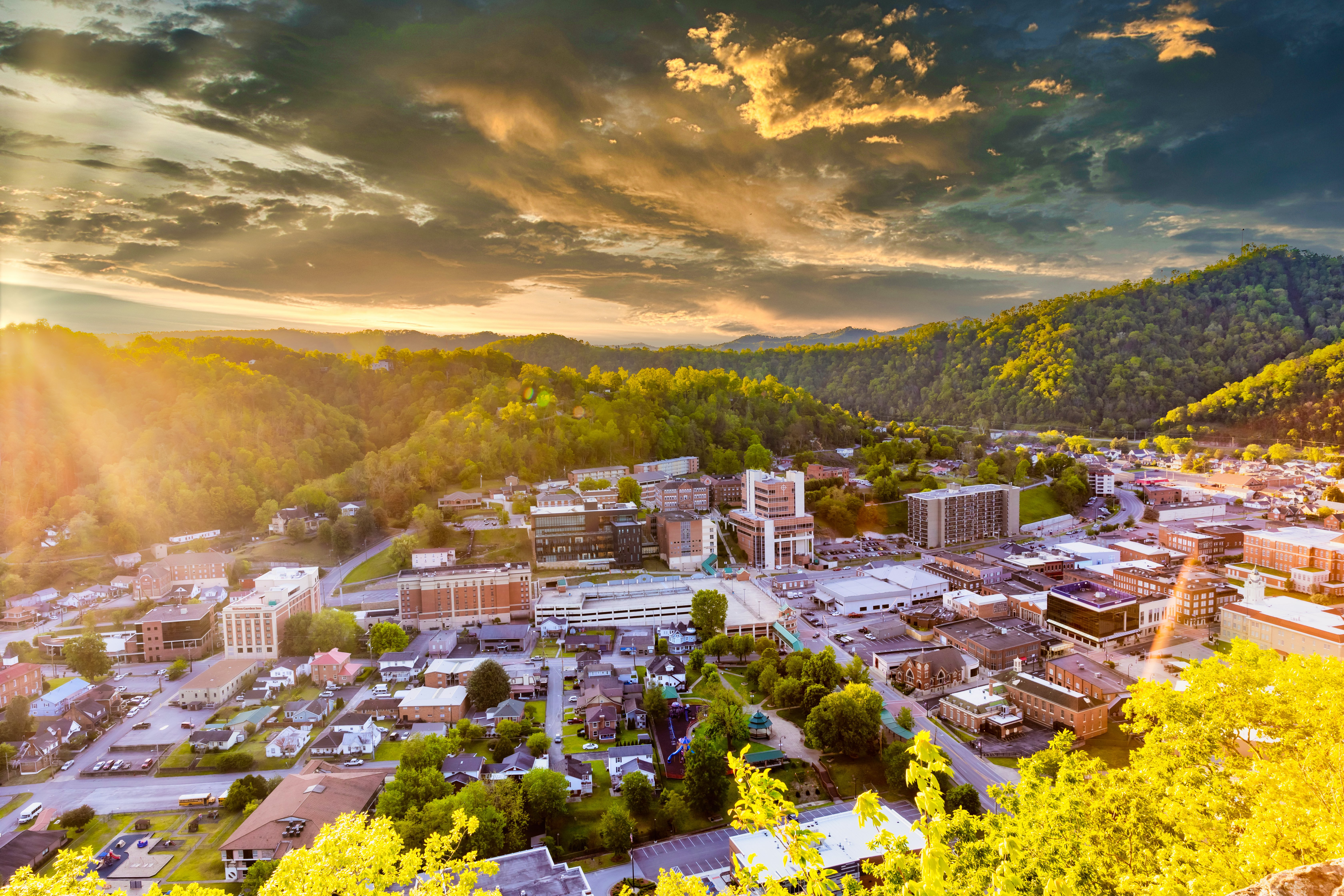
Campus from overlook

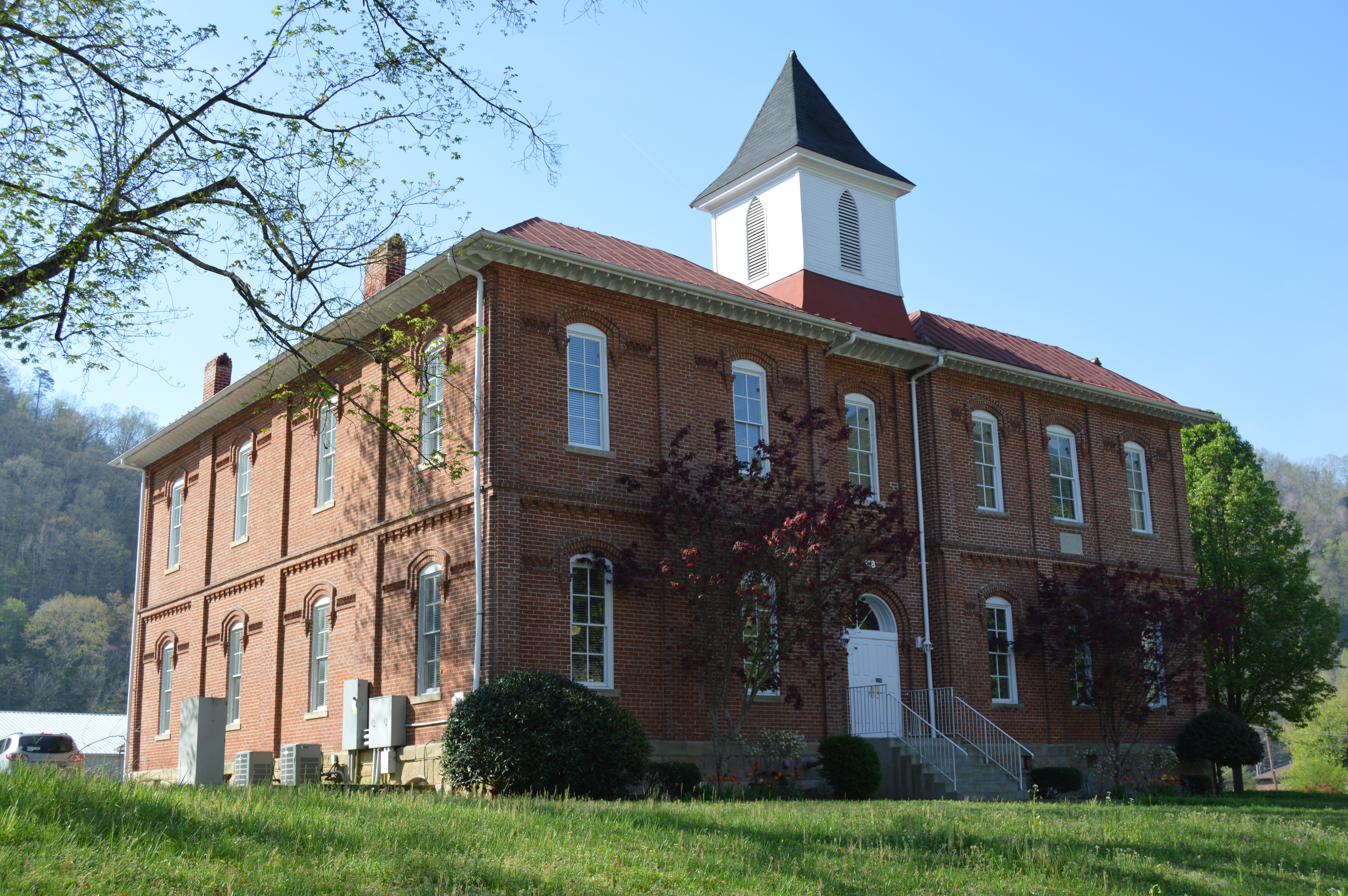
Training-Academy Building

The University of Pikeville is located on a 25 acres (0.10 km^{2}) hillside campus, overlooking Downtown Pikeville in Kentucky's Eastern Mountain Coal Fields region.

=== Academic buildings ===
- Armington Learning Center – A building which houses all undergraduate math and science classes, undergraduate labs, various faculty offices, Chrisman Auditorium, the Chrisman Appalachian Research Institute.
- Administration Building – The Administration Building houses the Patton College of Education.
- Allara Library – Dedicated in 1991, the Allara Library contains 3 floors of study rooms, books, a small cache of microfilm and microfiche, and the basement houses the University of Pikeville tutoring lab. The Allara Library was remodeled from the old Pikeville Hospital.
- Coal Building – This building houses the University of Pikeville Kentucky College of Osteopathic Medicine.
- Health Professions Building – This building houses the University of Pikeville Kentucky College of Optometry. Also, the building houses a Chick-fil-A and Einstein Bros. Bagels.
- Record Memorial Hall – This building serves as a connection between Hambley Boulevard and University of Pikeville and also contains Booth Auditorium, the Sturgill Board Room, the Elizabeth Akers Nursing Program, the Marguerite Weber Art Gallery, and the Ridenour Dance Studio. It was named in honor of a long-serving college president.
- Training-Academy Building – This is the oldest building on campus, and is listed on the National Register of Historic Places. It houses the Coleman College of Business.

=== Residential buildings ===
- Derrianna Hall – Has always been a female dorm and houses a mix of freshman and upperclassmen females.
- Condit Hall – Houses freshman female students exclusively. The campus safety office is also located in Condit.
- Page Hall – Although originally a dorm for female campus residents, it now houses all freshman males and also houses clubs and organizations that are registered with affinity housing
- Wickham Hall – Wickham Hall, like Page Hall, was originally a residence hall for female campus residents but now is a co-ed Hall. The ground floor of the building holds the student lounge.
- Kinzer Residential Center – Kinzer Hall houses both male and female upperclassmen (specifically junior and senior) campus residents.
- Spilman Hall – Located next to Page Hall, Spillman is a Co-Ed dorm that also holds handicap dorms on the first level.
- UPIKE South – Formerly a hotel, UPIKE South is the first off-campus housing and is only offered to graduate students.
- Bears Tower - Like UPIKE South, Bears Tower was formerly a hotel, and houses primarily upperclassmen and honors students.
- Gillespie Hall – Located next to Kinzer Hall, Gillespie Hall housed honors freshman students before it was demolished to make room for the Tanner College of Dental Medicine.
- College Square Residence Hall – College Square is a co-ed hall located by the campus gym. It houses primarily upperclassmen student athletes.

== Academics ==
The University of Pikeville award associate degrees, bachelor's degrees, master's degrees, and doctoral degrees. The university's Doctor of Osteopathic Medicine degree is awarded in collaboration with the University of Pikeville Kentucky College of Osteopathic Medicine and the Doctor of Optometry program began in 2016.

== Student life ==
The Marvin Student Center housed the campus bookstore, lounge, gameroom, post office, Upward Bound Program, and ROTC/National Guard Offices until it was demolished during the fall semester of 2010. A new building for the medical school called the Coal Building was built in its place. The new $34 million educational facility was dedicated on September 15, 2012.

UPIKE's men's and women's basketball teams play at the 5,700-seat Appalachian Wireless Arena adjacent to the campus in downtown Pikeville. The Expo Center opened in 2005 and replaced the UPike Gym as the home of the men's and women's basketball teams, although the women's volleyball team still uses the gym. The facility has also hosted the Mid-South Conference basketball tournament.

== Athletics ==
The Pikeville (UPike) athletic teams are called the Bears. The university is a member of the National Association of Intercollegiate Athletics (NAIA), primarily competing in the Appalachian Athletic Conference (AAC) since the 2023–24 academic year. The Bears previously competed in the Kentucky Intercollegiate Athletic Conference (KIAC; now currently known as the River States Conference (RSC) since the 2016–17 school year) from 1958–59 to 1999–2000 and in the Mid-South Conference between 2000–2001 and 2022–23.

UPike competes in 25 intercollegiate varsity sports. Men's sports include baseball, basketball, bowling, cross country, football, golf, soccer, swimming, tennis, track & field and wrestling; women's sports include basketball, bowling, cross country, golf, soccer, softball, swimming, tennis, track & field and volleyball; and co-ed sports include archery, cheerleading, dance and eSports.

Pikeville athletics have won numerous conference championships and three national championships: two in women's bowling in 2004 and 2008 and a NAIA DI men's basketball championship in 2011.

== Notable people ==
=== Alumni ===
- Kelly Coleman – All-American basketball player, all-time leading scorer in Kentucky High School history, drafted #11 overall by the New York Knicks in the 1960 NBA draft
- Walt Harris – former basketball player, current mixed martial artist for the UFC
- Rodney Hawkins – ABA basketball player for the Buffalo eXtreme
- Donnie Jones – graduated in 1988; former assistant and head basketball coach at Marshall University (1990–1996; 2007–2010, respectively), head basketball coach at University of Central Florida (2010–2016), and assistant basketball coach at the University of Florida (1996–2007), Wichita State 2017 and the University of Dayton 2018; currently the head basketball coach at Stetson University
- Judi Patton – former First Lady of Kentucky; wife of current university chancellor and former governor Paul E. Patton
- John Paul Riddle – graduated in 1920; pioneer aviator and co-founder of the Embry-Riddle Aeronautical University
- Will T. Scott – former justice of Kentucky's 7th Supreme Court District
- E.J. Underwood – former NFL, CFL, AFL and CIFL player
- Grady Wallace – attended in 1953–54 and 1954–55; went to the University of South Carolina afterward to play basketball and was named a consensus Second Team All-American and led the NCAA in scoring his senior season

=== Presidents ===
#	Name	Term begin	Term end	Notes	References
1	David Blythe	1889	1891	(Note: Principal of Pikeville College Institute or Pikeville College Academy.)	
2	Katherine B. Vreeland	1892	1894		
3	Tobias J. Kendrick	1894	1895		
4	James H. Hammett	1895	1898		
5	Thomas M. Cornelison	1898	1899		
6	James Franklin Record	1899	1911		
7	J.P. Whitehead	1911	1915		
8	James Franklin Record	1915	1932		
9	Frank D. McClelland	1932	1937		
10	Harry M. Crooks	1938	1940		
11	A.A. Page	1940	1962		
12	Burnice H. Jarman	1963	1965		
13	Thomas H. Johns	1967	1969		
14	Robert S. Cope	1969	1974		
15	Jackson O. Hall	1975	1985		
16	William H. Owens	1985	1997		
17	Harold H. Smith	1997	2009		
18	Micheal M. Looney	2009	2009		
19	Paul E. Patton	2009	2013	Governor of Kentucky from 1995 to 2003. Current university chancellor.	
20	James L. Hurley	2013	2015		
21	Burton Webb	2016			
