= Cardwellton =

- U.S. National Register of Historic Places
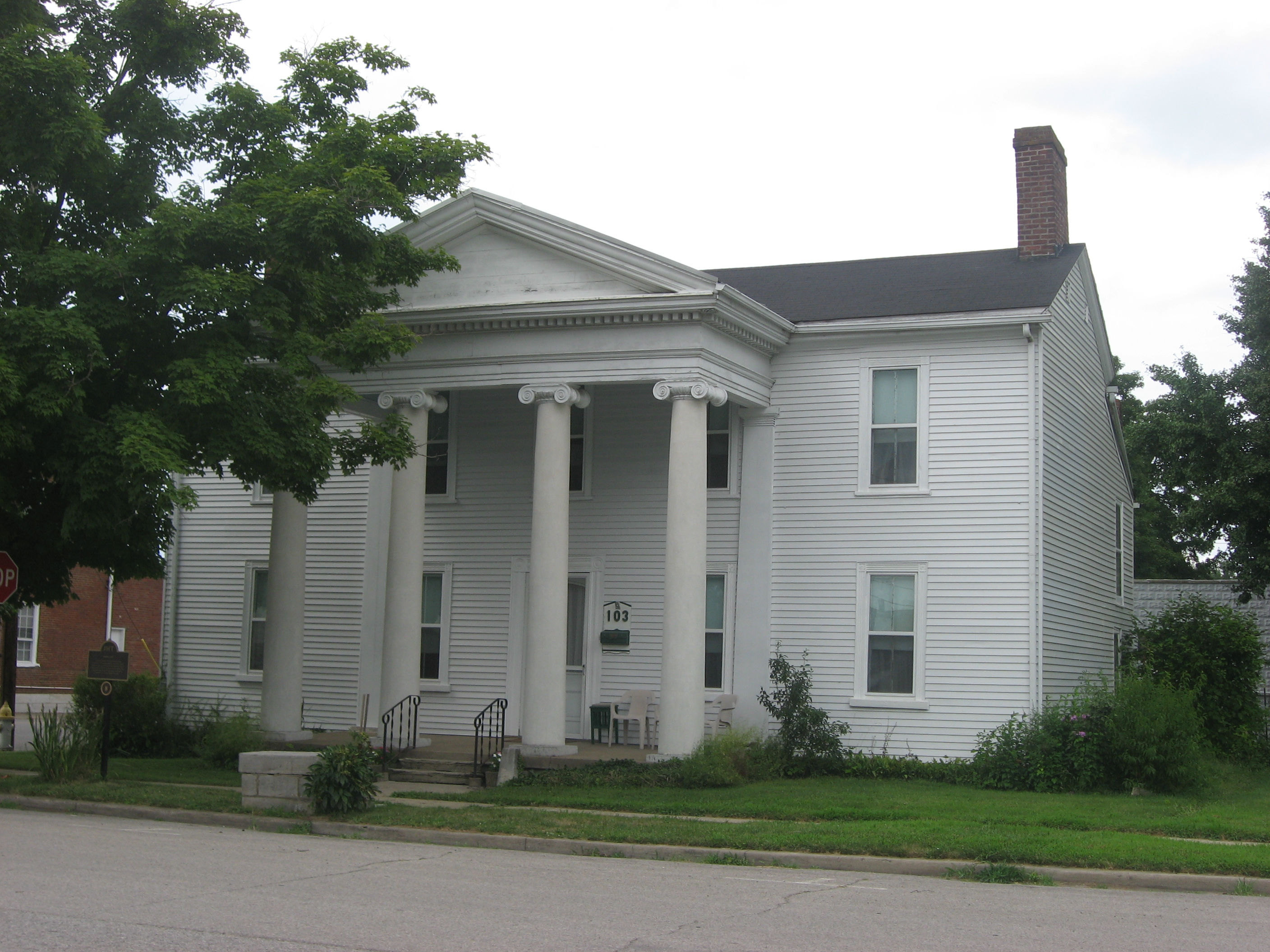

- Location within Kentucky Location within the United States
- Location: 103 E. Broadway, Harrodsburg, Kentucky
- Coordinates: 37°45′49″N 84°50′34″W
- Area: 1 acre (0.40 ha)
- Built: c.1785, c.1820
- Architectural style: Greek Revival, Federal
- NRHP reference No.: 77000636
- Added to NRHP: November 17, 1977

Cardwellton, at 103 E. Broadway in Harrodsburg, Kentucky, is a historic house which was begun in about 1785. It was listed on the National Register of Historic Places in 1977.

The "nucleus of the house" is a log cabin built around 1785. The main block of the house is believed to have been built around 1820. Its Greek Revival portico was added between 1831 and 1837. It includes elements of Greek Revival and Federal architecture.
