= USS Manlove =

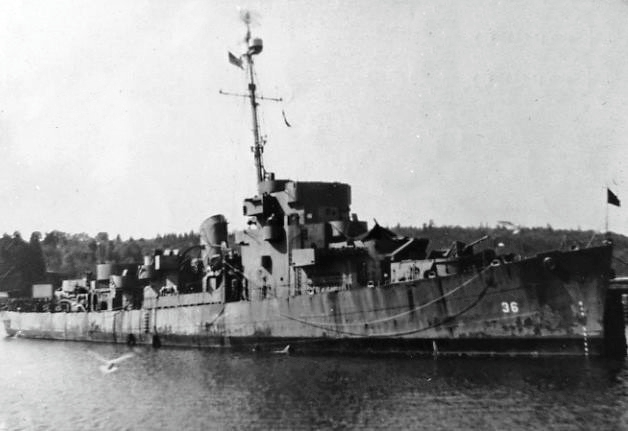
- Manlove c. September 1945

History

United States
- Name: USS Manlove
- Builder: Mare Island Navy Yard
- Laid down: 24 February 1943
- Launched: 28 July 1943
- Commissioned: 8 November 1943
- Decommissioned: 16 November 1945
- Stricken: 28 November 1945
- Honors and awards: 5 battle stars (World War II)
- Fate: Sold for scrapping, 9 February 1948

General characteristics
- Type: Evarts-class destroyer escort
- Displacement: 1,140 long tons (1,158 t) standard; 1,430 long tons (1,453 t) full
- Length: 289 ft 5 in (88.21 m) o/a; 283 ft 6 in (86.41 m) w/l
- Beam: 35 ft (11 m)
- Draft: 11 ft (3.4 m) (max)
- Installed power: 6,000 hp (4,500 kW)
- Propulsion: 4 × General Motors Model 16-278A diesel engines with electric drive; 2 × screws
- Speed: 19 knots (35 km/h; 22 mph)
- Range: 4,150 nmi (7,690 km)
- Complement: 15 officers and 183 enlisted
- Armament: 3 × 3"/50 Mk.22 dual-purpose guns; 4 × 1.1"/75 Mk.2 AA guns (1×4); 9 × 20 mm Mk.4 AA guns; 1 × Hedgehog Projector Mk.10 (144 rounds); 8 × Mk.6 depth charge projectors; 2 × Mk.9 depth charge tracks

USS Manlove (DE-36) was an Evarts-class destroyer escort of the United States Navy during World War II. She was promptly sent off into the Pacific Ocean to protect convoys and other ships from Japanese submarines and fighter aircraft. She performed dangerous work in numerous battle areas, and was awarded five battle stars.

== Design ==
The Evarts-class destroyer escorts were 289 ft 5 in (88.21 m) long overall, and they had a beam of 35 ft 2 in (10.72 m). They had an average draft of 10 ft 1 in (3.07 m) at their full load displacement of 1,416 long tons (1,439 t). Each ship had a normal crew numbered 156 officers and sailors.

Manlove was propelled by a pair of diesel motors manufactured by General Motors, which drove a pair of screw propellers. Her propulsion system was rated to produce 6,000 brake horsepower (4,500 kW) for a top speed of 19.5 knots (36.1 km/h; 22.4 mph). Oil storage amounted to between 131 and 197 long tons (133 and 200 t), which allowed a cruising radius of up to 6,000 nautical miles (11,000 km; 6,900 mi) at an economical pace of 10 knots (19 km/h; 12 mph).

The ship's armament consisted of a main battery of three 3-inch (76 mm) /50-caliber guns in individual pivot mounts, which could be used against air or surface targets. These were supported by a light anti-aircraft battery that initially consisted of four 1.1 in (28 mm) /75-caliber guns in a quadruple mount and nine 20 mm (0.79 in) Oerlikon guns. For attacks against submarines, the ship was equipped with a Hedgehog mortar, eight depth charge throwers, and two depth charge racks.

== Service history ==
Manlove was laid down as BDE-36, on 24 February 1943 by the Navy Yard, Mare Island, California. The ship was redesignated DE-36, on 16 June 1943 and renamed Manlove after Arthur Manlove, who had been killed aboard USS Arizona during the attack on Pearl Harbor. Manlove was launched on 28 July 1943, sponsored by the widow of the ship's namesake. The new destroyer escort was commissioned on 8 November 1943.

After post-shakedown repairs at San Francisco, California, Manlove escorted a convoy to Pearl Harbor and upon arrival, on 16 January 1944, commenced local training operations. The next month, she made one round trip voyage to Majuro, Marshall Islands, returning on 18 February. She again departed for the Marshalls on the 28th. From 5 March – 16 May, she cruised the Marshall Islands area on anti-submarine patrols and in hunter-killer (HUK) operations. On 24 March, during her first HUK assignment, she located the Japanese transport submarine I-32, then attempting to replenish the enemy garrison at Wotje. In the ensuing coordinated depth charge run, Manlove and her companion, PC-1135, sank the Japanese boat.

Manlove departed Majuro on 16 May for Kwajalein, beginning convoy escort duty between the two atolls. In mid-June, she extended her escort area and screened fleet oilers to a refueling rendezvous at sea off the Marianas. She then sailed to Eniwetok for a month of patrol. In early August, she returned to escort duty and joined a convoy headed for Hawaii. The convoy arrived Pearl Harbor on 29 August. Following repairs, Manlove participated in training operations with submarines in Hawaiian waters until her departure for the Marshalls on 8 October. The escort arrived Eniwetok on 17 October. From then until the following March, she was primarily engaged in screening convoys between Eniwetok and Ulithi, Caroline Islands. She briefly interrupted her cruises between these islands in early February 1945 for an escort convoy assignment to Manus, Admiralty Islands.

On 9 March, Manlove departed Eniwetok for Saipan to join units of the 5th Fleet assembling for the Okinawa campaign. She sailed with the invasion fleet on 26 March and arrived on patrol station off Okinawa on 2 April. There she assisted in repelling enemy air attacks until damaged on 11 April by an exploding Japanese airplane. After repairs at Guam, she returned to patrols off Okinawa. With only one break in this duty, escorting a convoy to the Philippines and back, she continued to contribute to the success of the Okinawa campaign until ordered back to the U.S. on 5 July.

Proceeding via Eniwetok and Pearl Harbor, Manlove arrived at Seattle, Washington, on 26 June 1945. She was inactivated at Puget Sound Naval Shipyard; decommissioned on 16 November 1945; and was sold for scrap to A. G. Schoonmaker Co., Inc., of New York City, on 4 December 1947.

== Awards ==
- Combat Action Ribbon (retroactive)
- American Campaign Medal
- Asiatic–Pacific Campaign Medal (with five service stars)
- World War II Victory Medal
