= Pikeville Commercial Historic District =

Historic district in Kentucky, United States

- U.S. National Register of Historic Places
- U.S. Historic district
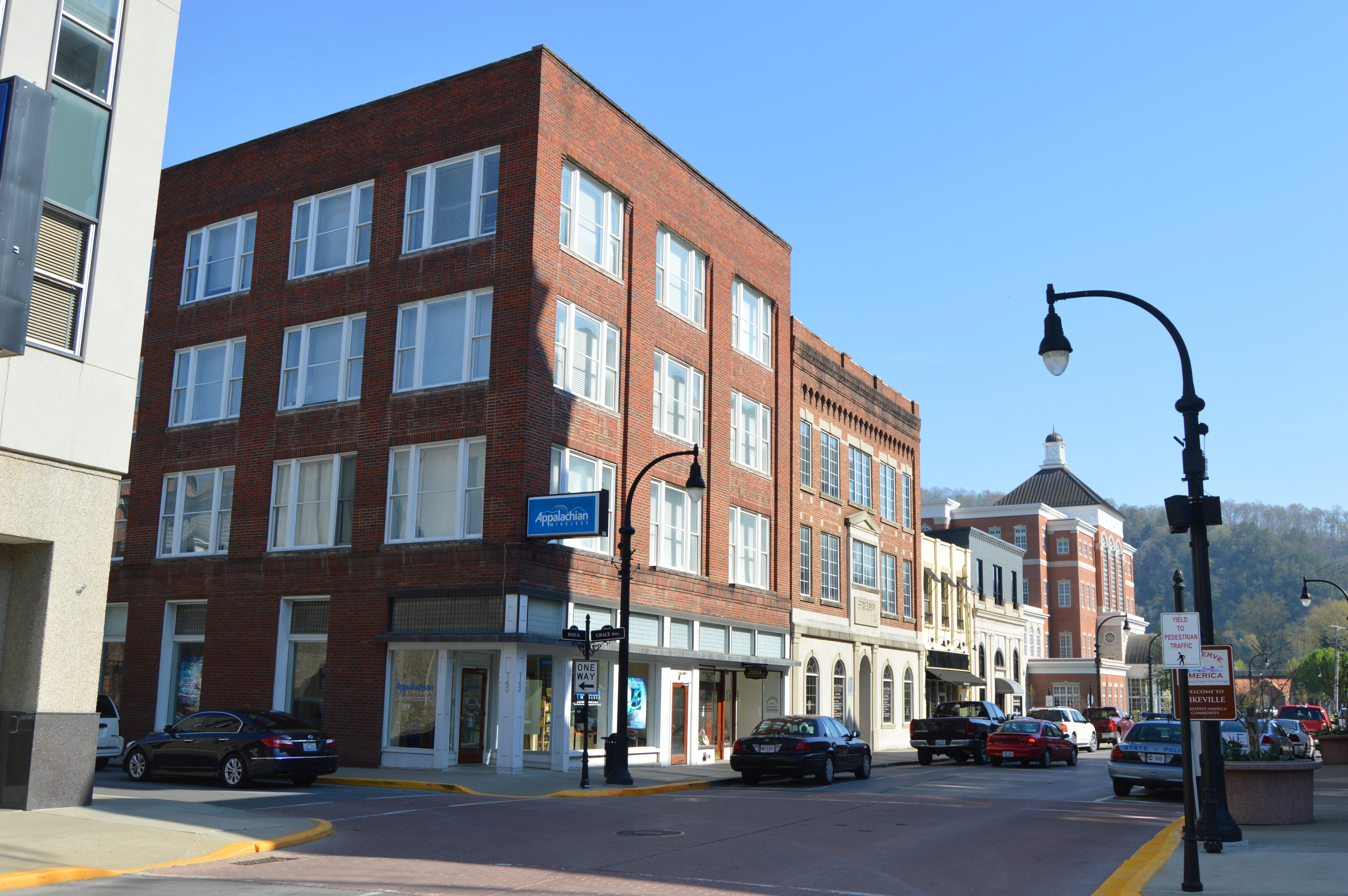

- Location within Kentucky Location within the United States
- Location: Main St. and Division Ave., Pikeville, Kentucky
- Coordinates: 37°28′45″N 82°31′04″W
- Area: 1.5 acres (0.61 ha)
- MPS: Pikeville MRA
- NRHP reference No.: 84001916 (original); 100010771 (increase)

Significant dates
- Added to NRHP: September 20, 1984
- Boundary increase: October 25, 2024

The Pikeville Commercial Historic District in Pikeville, Kentucky, located at Main St. and Division Ave., is a 1.5 acres (0.61 ha) historic district which was listed on the National Register of Historic Places in 1984. It included 10 contributing buildings and 12 non-contributing buildings.

It includes the four-story Pikeville Drug/Anthony Hotel building, built between 1920 and 1925.
