= Cornishville, Kentucky =

Unincorporated community in Kentucky, United States

Cornishville
- Unincorporated community
- Founded by George Doggett Cornish circa 1919
- Location within the state of Kentucky Cornishville (the United States)
- Coordinates: 37°48′01″N 84°59′37″W
- Country: United States
- State: Kentucky
- County: Mercer
- Elevation: 827 ft (252 m)
- Time zone: UTC-5 (Eastern (EST))
  - Summer (DST): UTC-4 (EDT)
- GNIS feature ID: 490127

Cornishville is an unincorporated community located in Mercer County, Kentucky, United States. Its post office is closed.

Cornishville was incorporated in 1847.
