= Pikeville College Academy Building =

- U.S. National Register of Historic Places
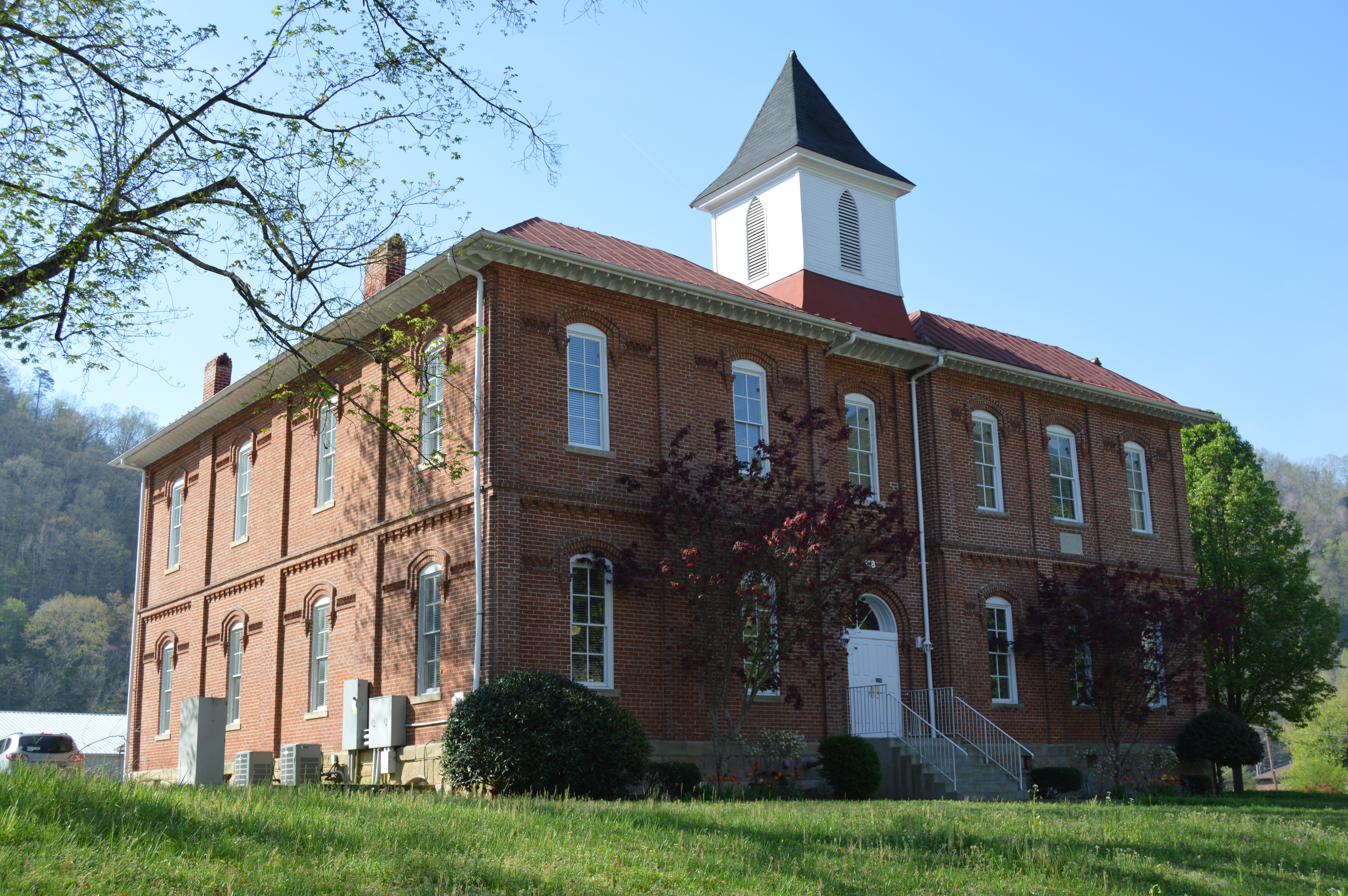

- Location within Kentucky Location within the United States
- Location: College St., Pikeville, Kentucky
- Coordinates: 37°28′33″N 82°31′18″W
- Area: 1 acre (0.40 ha)
- Built: 1890
- NRHP reference No.: 73000828
- Added to NRHP: February 16, 1973

The Pikeville College Academy Building, on College St. in Pikeville, Kentucky, was built in 1890. It was listed on the National Register of Historic Places in 1973.

It is the oldest building on the campus of what is now the University of Pikeville, and is in fact the oldest educational building in Pike County. It is a two-story brick building on a stone foundation; its bricks were made on site.

It has also been known as the Pikeville Collegiate Institute Building.
