= Salvisa, Kentucky =

Census-designated place in Kentucky, United States

Salvisa
- Census-designated place
- Location within Kentucky
- Coordinates: 37°55′16″N 84°51′42″W
- Country: United States
- State: Kentucky
- County: Mercer

Area
  - Total: 1.85 sq mi (4.78 km^{2})
  - Land: 1.84 sq mi (4.77 km^{2})
  - Water: 0.0077 sq mi (0.02 km^{2})
- Elevation: 801 ft (244 m)

Population (2020)
  - Total: 410
  - Density: 222.8/sq mi (86.03/km^{2})
- Time zone: UTC-5 (Eastern (EST))
  - Summer (DST): UTC-4 (EDT)
- ZIP code: 40372
- Area code: 859
- GNIS feature ID: 2629677

Salvisa is a census-designated place in Mercer County, Kentucky, United States. As of the 2020 census, Salvisa had a population of 410. Salvisa is located at the junction of U.S. Route 127 and Kentucky Route 1987, 10.7 miles (17.2 km) north of Harrodsburg. Salvisa has a post office with ZIP code 40372, which opened on April 4, 1825.

Salvisa was laid out in 1816.

== Demographics ==
Historical population
Census	Pop.	Note	%±
2020	410		—
U.S. Decennial Census

== Climate ==
The climate in this area is characterized by hot, humid summers and generally mild to cool winters. According to the Köppen Climate Classification system, Salvisa has a humid subtropical climate, abbreviated "Cfa" on climate maps.
