= Mercer County, Kentucky =

County in Kentucky, United States

- County
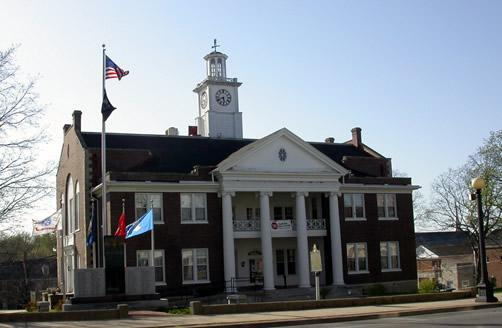
- Mercer County Courthouse in Harrodsburg

- Location within the U.S. state of Kentucky
- Coordinates: 37°48′N 84°53′W
- Country: United States
- State: Kentucky
- Founded: 1785
- Named for: Hugh Mercer
- Seat: Harrodsburg
- Largest city: Harrodsburg

Government
  - Judge/Executive: Sarah Steele (R)

Area
  - Total: 253 sq mi (660 km^{2})
  - Land: 249 sq mi (640 km^{2})
  - Water: 4.5 sq mi (12 km^{2}) 1.8%

Population (2020)
  - Total: 22,641
  - Estimate (2025): 23,733 ▲
  - Density: 90.9/sq mi (35.1/km^{2})
- Time zone: UTC−5 (Eastern)
  - Summer (DST): UTC−4 (EDT)
- Congressional district: 2nd
- Website: mercercounty.ky.gov

Mercer County is a county located in the central part of the U.S. Commonwealth of Kentucky. As of the 2020 census, the population was 23,772. Its county seat is Harrodsburg. The county was formed from Lincoln County, Virginia in 1785 and is named for Revolutionary War General Hugh Mercer, who was killed at the Battle of Princeton in 1777. It was formerly a prohibition or dry county.

== History ==
Harrodsburg was the first city formally chartered in Kentucky County, the Virginia district that later became the 15th state. It was originally the county seat of Lincoln County when it was formed in 1780, but it became the seat of Mercer County when it was created.

Pleasant Hill, also known as Shakertown, is the site of a former Shaker community, active especially in the years before the American Civil War. It is a National Historic Landmark District, consisting of more than 30 historic buildings. The district also includes acres of farm and parkland.

During the Civil War, the county was divided in sentiment. Union control permitted the organization of 2 Union regiments, the 19th Regiment Kentucky Volunteer Infantry and the 11th Regiment Kentucky Volunteer Cavalry. However, many county men also served in the Confederate Army. The 19th Kentucky Infantry (Union) was organized at Camp Harwood for a three-year enlistment commencing January 2, 1862, commanded Col. William J. Landram. Companies A, C, D, and F of the 11th Kentucky Cavalry (Union) were organized at Harrodsburg in July 1862. The remainder of the regiment was organized in Louisville, Kentucky, and mustered in for three years on September 26, 1862, under the Colonel Alexander W. Holeman. Following the Battle of Perryville, much of Harrodsburg and surrounding towns were converted into makeshift hospitals; 1600 sick and wounded Confederate soldiers were captured during a raid in Harrodsburg by the 9th Kentucky Cavalry on October 10, 1862. The city then remained under martial law for the remainder of the war.

The Louisville Southern Railroad reached Harrodsburg in 1888. Louisville Southern Railway's construction commenced in 1884 and ran from Louisville through Shelbyville and Lawrenceburg to Harrodsburg, which was reached in 1888. The rail yard and station were located at the corner of Office Street and Merimon Avenue. A spur was later constructed from the station to Burgin, where the Louisville Southern joined the Cincinnati Southern's Cincinnati, New Orleans and Texas Pacific Railway CNO&TP mainline which runs through the eastern part of the country from High Bridge of Kentucky to Burgin to Danville was opened in 1877. Now all run and operated by Norfolk Southern Railway.

Company D of the 192nd Tank Battalion, which took part in the World War II Battle of Bataan was from Harrodsburg.

== Geography ==
According to the United States Census Bureau, the county has a total area of 253 square miles (660 km^{2}), of which 249 square miles (640 km^{2}) is land and 4.5 square miles (12 km^{2}) (1.8%) is water.

Mercer County is located in central Kentucky in the Bluegrass region.

=== Adjacent counties ===
- Anderson County (north)
- Woodford County (northeast)
- Jessamine County (east)
- Garrard County (southeast)
- Boyle County (south)
- Washington County (west)

== Demographics ==
Historical population
Census	Pop.	Note	%±
1790	7,091		—
1800	9,646		36.0%
1810	12,630		30.9%
1820	15,587		23.4%
1830	17,694		13.5%
1840	18,720		5.8%
1850	14,067		−24.9%
1860	13,701		−2.6%
1870	13,144		−4.1%
1880	14,142		7.6%
1890	15,034		6.3%
1900	14,426		−4.0%
1910	14,063		−2.5%
1920	14,795		5.2%
1930	14,471		−2.2%
1940	14,629		1.1%
1950	14,643		0.1%
1960	14,596		−0.3%
1970	15,960		9.3%
1980	19,011		19.1%
1990	19,148		0.7%
2000	20,817		8.7%
2010	21,331		2.5%
2020	22,641		6.1%
2025 (est.)	23,733	▲	4.8%
U.S. Decennial Census; 1790-1960 1900-1990; 1990-2000 2010-2020

=== 2020 census ===
As of the 2020 census, the county had a population of 22,641. The median age was 43.4 years. 22.1% of residents were under the age of 18 and 19.9% of residents were 65 years of age or older. For every 100 females there were 96.3 males, and for every 100 females age 18 and over there were 93.7 males age 18 and over.

The racial makeup of the county was 89.5% White, 3.4% Black or African American, 0.3% American Indian and Alaska Native, 0.3% Asian, 0.1% Native Hawaiian and Pacific Islander, 1.6% from some other race, and 4.8% from two or more races. Hispanic or Latino residents of any race comprised 3.1% of the population.

43.2% of residents lived in urban areas, while 56.8% lived in rural areas.

There were 9,213 households in the county, of which 29.5% had children under the age of 18 living with them and 24.9% had a female householder with no spouse or partner present. About 26.8% of all households were made up of individuals and 13.2% had someone living alone who was 65 years of age or older.

There were 10,338 housing units, of which 10.9% were vacant. Among occupied housing units, 72.5% were owner-occupied and 27.5% were renter-occupied. The homeowner vacancy rate was 2.2% and the rental vacancy rate was 5.9%.

=== 2000 census ===
As of the census of 2000, there were 20,817 people, 8,423 households, and 6,039 families residing in the county. The population density was 83 per square mile (32/km^{2}). There were 9,289 housing units at an average density of 37 per square mile (14/km^{2}). The racial makeup of the county was 94.00% White, 3.69% Black or African American, 0.21% Native American, 0.47% Asian, 0.03% Pacific Islander, 0.63% from other races, and 0.96% from two or more races. 1.27% of the population were Hispanics or Latinos of any race.

There were 8,423 households, out of which 31.80% had children under the age of 18 living with them, 57.80% were married couples living together, 10.40% had a female householder with no husband present, and 28.30% were non-families. 25.10% of all households were made up of individuals, and 11.60% had someone living alone who was 65 years of age or older. The average household size was 2.45 and the average family size was 2.93.

By age, 24.40% of the population was under 18, 7.40% from 18 to 24, 29.10% from 25 to 44, 24.50% from 45 to 64, and 14.60% were 65 or older. The median age was 38 years. For every 100 females there were 94.00 males. For every 100 females age 18 and over, there were 89.70 males.

The median income for a household in the county was US$35,555, and the median income for a family was $43,121. Males had a median income of $33,657 versus $22,418 for females. The per capita income for the county was $17,972. About 10.00% of families and 12.90% of the population were below the poverty line, including 17.40% of those under age 18 and 12.00% of those age 65 or over.

== Politics ==
United States presidential election results for Mercer County, Kentucky
Year	Republican		Democratic		Third party(ies)	
Year	No.	%	No.	%	No.	%
1912	889	27.00%	1,792	54.43%	611	18.56%
1916	1,531	41.84%	2,093	57.20%	35	0.96%
1920	2,786	43.25%	3,623	56.24%	33	0.51%
1924	2,715	49.62%	2,698	49.31%	59	1.08%
1928	3,462	61.76%	2,140	38.17%	4	0.07%
1932	1,950	33.94%	3,759	65.43%	36	0.63%
1936	2,161	36.97%	3,659	62.59%	26	0.44%
1940	1,845	33.73%	3,606	65.92%	19	0.35%
1944	2,039	39.62%	3,086	59.97%	21	0.41%
1948	1,599	35.97%	2,682	60.34%	164	3.69%
1952	2,545	47.91%	2,740	51.58%	27	0.51%
1956	3,168	53.23%	2,767	46.49%	17	0.29%
1960	3,569	56.81%	2,713	43.19%	0	0.00%
1964	1,732	32.57%	3,564	67.03%	21	0.39%
1968	2,432	43.07%	1,950	34.54%	1,264	22.39%
1972	3,575	66.08%	1,707	31.55%	128	2.37%
1976	2,451	40.91%	3,411	56.94%	129	2.15%
1980	3,275	46.99%	3,528	50.62%	167	2.40%
1984	4,592	63.88%	2,516	35.00%	81	1.13%
1988	3,904	57.05%	2,832	41.39%	107	1.56%
1992	3,211	41.96%	3,010	39.33%	1,432	18.71%
1996	3,264	44.82%	3,179	43.66%	839	11.52%
2000	5,362	62.12%	3,092	35.82%	178	2.06%
2004	6,745	67.26%	3,224	32.15%	59	0.59%
2008	6,781	67.41%	3,159	31.40%	120	1.19%
2012	6,820	68.62%	2,966	29.84%	153	1.54%
2016	7,740	73.12%	2,395	22.63%	450	4.25%
2020	8,506	72.48%	3,033	25.85%	196	1.67%
2024	8,826	74.47%	2,838	23.95%	187	1.58%

=== Local government ===
County Judge/Executive

- Sarah Steele

County Magistrates

1. Stephen Elliott
2. Tim Darland
3. Jackie Claycomb
4. Susan Barrington
5. Kevin Hicks
6. Dennis Holiday

County Attorney

- Ted Dean

County Coroner

- Sonny Ransdell

Sheriff

- Ernie Kelty

County Clerk

- Chris Horn

Circuit Clerk

- Alison Buchanan

District Court Judge

- Jeff Dotson

Circuit Court Judge

- Darren Peckler

Family Court Judge

- Bruce Petrie

Jailer

- Brett Chamberlin

=== Elected officials ===
Elected officials as of January 3, 2025
U.S. House	Andy Barr (R)	KY 6
Ky. Senate	Amanda Mays Bledsoe (R)	12
Ky. House	Kim King (R)	55

== Local attractions ==
- Old Fort Harrod State Park, features a reconstruction of Fort Harrod, the first permanent settlement in the state of Kentucky.
- Shaker Village of Pleasant Hill, a living history museum.
- Herrington Lake

== Communities ==
=== Cities ===
- Burgin
- Harrodsburg

=== Census-designated place ===
- Salvisa

=== Unincorporated communities ===
- Bondville
- Bushtown (east)
- Bushtown (west)
- Cornishville
- Duncan
- Ebenezer
- Mayo
- McAfee
- Pleasant Hill
- Talmage

=== Ghost town ===
- Hilltop

== Education ==
School districts include:

- Burgin Independent School District
- Mercer County Schools

== Notable people ==
- John Adair (1757–1840), former member of the United States House of Representatives and United States Senate, and former governor of Kentucky
- Ralph G. Anderson, founder Belcan Corporation, philanthropist
- Jacqueline Coleman, 58th Lieutenant Governor of Kentucky (2019–)
- Maria Thompson Daviess (1872–1924), author
- Ann O'Delia Diss Debar, late 19th and early 20th century medium and criminal
- Jason Dunn, National Football League player
- David Winfield Huddleston, Christian author and minister
- Rachel Jackson, wife of President Andrew Jackson
- Frances Wisebart Jacobs, philanthropist
- Dennis Johnson, National Football League player
- William Logan, politician
- Beriah Magoffin, Governor of Kentucky (1859–1862) and namesake of Magoffin County, Kentucky
- William Sullivan, politician and lawyer
- John Burton Thompson, politician
- Al Wilson, actor and stunt pilot
- Craig Yeast, National Football League player

== See also ==
- National Register of Historic Places listings in Mercer County, Kentucky
