= Silas Harlan =

American settler (1753–1782)

- Born: March 17, 1753; Harlan's Run, Virginia Colony (present Berkeley County, West Virginia)
- Died: August 19, 1782 (aged 29); Battle of Blue Licks, Nicholas County, Kentucky
- Burial place: Blue Licks State Park Cemetery, Robertson County, Kentucky
- Occupations: Soldier, pioneer, surveyor, frontiersman, scout, longhunter
- Known for: Harlan County, Kentucky
- Relatives: Jacob Harlan (uncle); Capt. James Harlan (brother); Rep. James Harlan (nephew); John Marshall Harlan (great-nephew)
- Military career
- Allegiance: United States of America
- Branch: Kentucky Militia
- Service: 1774–1782 (8 years)
- Rank: Major
- Commands: Illinois Campaigns of 1779; Battle of Chillicothe; Battle of Blue Licks
- Wars: Dunmore's War; American Revolution; American Indian Wars

Silas Harlan (March 17, 1753 – August 19, 1782) was one of the early settlers of Kentucky, having arrived with James Harrod in 1774 to found Harrodstown – the oldest permanent white settlement in the territory (now Harrodsburg). Silas spent the majority of the American Revolution on the frontier fighting against the Indians, however, near the end of his life, he served under George Rogers Clark through the Illinois Campaigns of 1779 and died at the Battle of Blue Licks on August 19, 1782, fighting a mixed band of Natives, Loyalists and British troops.

Following his death, Silas' fiancée, Sarah Caldwell, married his brother James and was the grandmother of U.S. Supreme Court Justice John Marshall Harlan.

Harlan County, Kentucky is named in honor of Silas Harlan.

== Kentucky Settlement ==
Silas and his brother, James, accompanied James Harrod in founding Harrodstown, the oldest permanent white settlement in Kentucky, in May 1774 and is listed as a town resident in a census between December 1777 and October 1778, along with Squire Boone, younger brother to famous pioneer Daniel Boone. As a member of the Committee for the Defense of West Fincastle in 1776, Silas supported making Kentucky a county of Virginia rather than an independent state under the Transylvania Company, as did George Rogers Clark.

In 1778, Silas, with the help of his uncle, Jacob, and his brother, James, founded "Harlan's Station", a log stockade on the Salt River near Danville, about seven miles above Harrodsburg.

== Revolutionary War ==
While serving with the Kentucky militia, he was a scout and hunter and ultimately received the rank of major. January 2, 1777, at Harrodsburg, Silas Harlan was one of about thirty men raised by James Harrod to retrieve five hundred pounds of gunpowder from Three Islands in present-day Lewis County. George Rogers Clark and John Gabriel Jones had acquired and delivered this powder from Fort Pitt (present Pittsburgh) the preceding August for the Kentucky settlers and Colonel John Todd had attempted to retrieve the powder December 25, 1776, but failed, leaving Harrod to the task the following week. Harrod's company, which also included David Glenn, Isaac Hite and Simon Kenton among Harlan, then secured the powder and returned to Harrodsburg.

He commanded a company of scouts under General George Rogers Clark in the Illinois Campaigns of 1779, and proved himself a most active, energetic and efficient officer. Silas was also Captain of a company in John Bowman's raid on Old Chillicothe in 1779, and assisted Clark in establishing Fort Jefferson at the mouth of the Ohio River in 1780.

Major Silas Harlan died on August 19, 1782, leading the advance party at the Battle of Blue Licks, one of the last battles of the American Revolution and the last victory for the Loyalists and Native Americans during the frontier war. He was highly regarded by his contemporaries. General Clark, who was an older brother of the more famed William Clark, said of Silas: "he was one of the bravest and most accomplished soldiers that ever fought by my side."

In Ref. 10, Silas Harlan is entry #215. Silas's father George Harlan (1718 - c. 1762) is entry #45. George's father James Harlan (1692 - post-1760) is entry #11. James's father George Harlan (c. 1650 - 1714) is entry #3. George's father James Harland (c. 1625 - ?) is entry #1.
