= David Glenn (pioneer) =

American pioneer

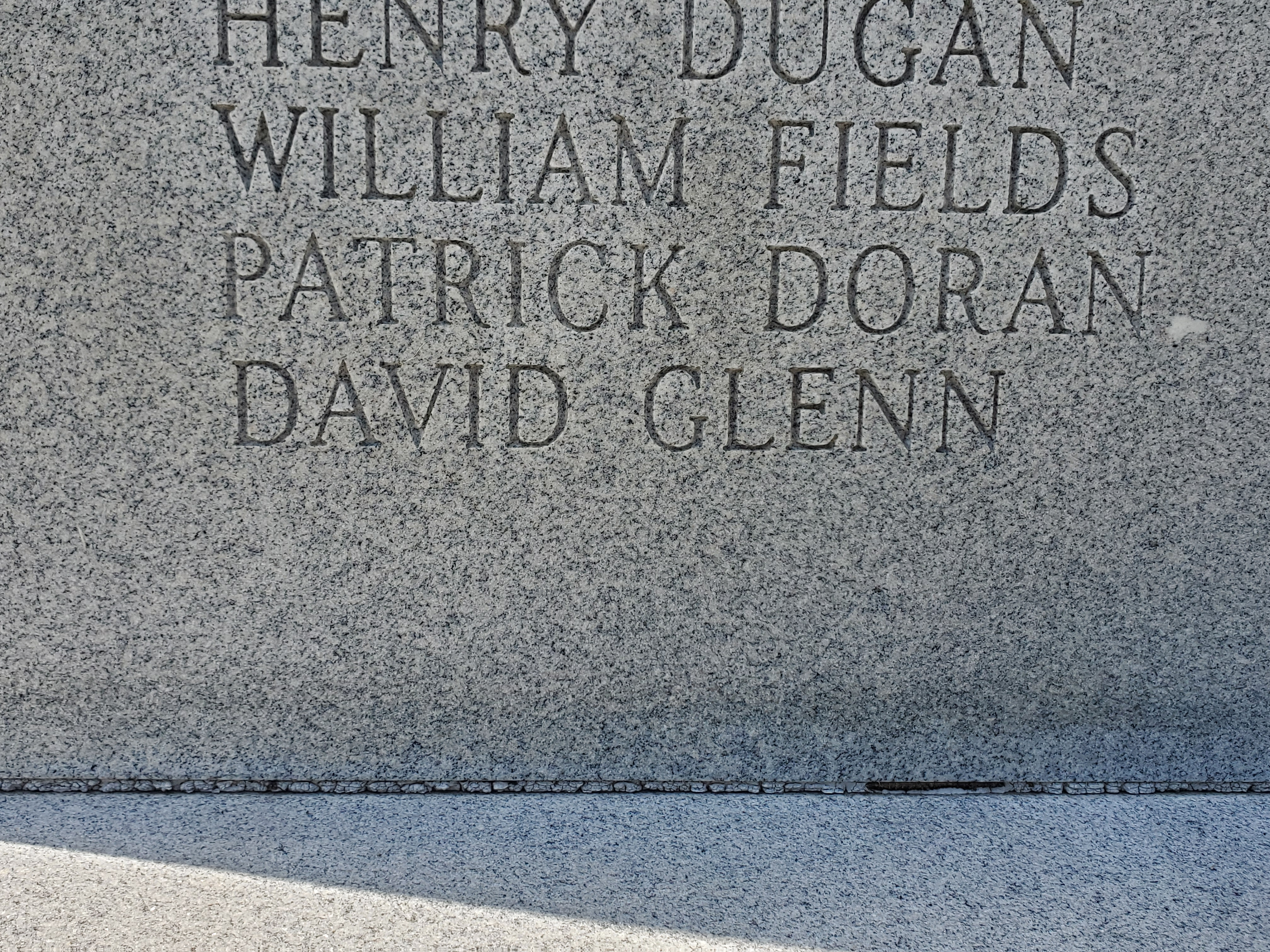
- David Glenn's name listed on the Harrodsburg Memorial
- Born: c. 1753; Pennsylvania, Virginia or North Carolina
- Died: c. March 1816 (about 63 years old); Daviess County, Kentucky
- Occupations: longhunter, frontiersman, soldier, justice of the peace, sheriff, commissioner
- Military career
- Allegiance: United States of America
- Branch: Kentucky Militia
- Service: 1774–1783 (9 years)
- Conflicts: Dunmore's War; Battle of Point Pleasant; American Revolution; Clark's Illinois Campaign; Raid on Old Chillicothe

David Glenn was of Scotch-Irish descent and was born around 1753 either in Pennsylvania, Virginia or North Carolina. He was one of the early settlers of Kentucky having accompanied James Harrod in founding Harrodstown in 1774, along with his older brother, Thomas. Today, Harrodsburg is considered the oldest permanent white settlement in Kentucky, being it was settled almost a full year before Boonesborough.

Throughout the Revolutionary War, David Glenn served as a hunter and soldier under General George Rogers Clark, accompanying him on his extraordinary expeditions to Kaskaskia and Vincennes during Clark's Illinois Campaigns in 1778–79. He was responsible for procuring supplies for Harrodsburg, maintaining a small cabin to store meat and provisions about 50 miles south of the fort on Russell Creek. This area eventually bore Glenn's name, originally called Glennsville and later known as Glens Fork, and it became a thriving town until suffering hard times and near-abandonment during the Civil War.

David Glenn was a fierce Indian fighter with many tales of narrow escapes from and acts of vengeance against the Wyandot, Mingo, Shawnee and Delaware tribes. He later moved west to Yellow Banks (present-day Owensboro) where he was instrumental in setting up then-Ohio County, serving as Trustee of Hartford Academy and Justice of the Peace. In 1815, when Daviess County was formed from Ohio County, David Glenn was appointed as one of the commissioners and later died in 1816 on his homestead.

== Harrod's Expedition ==
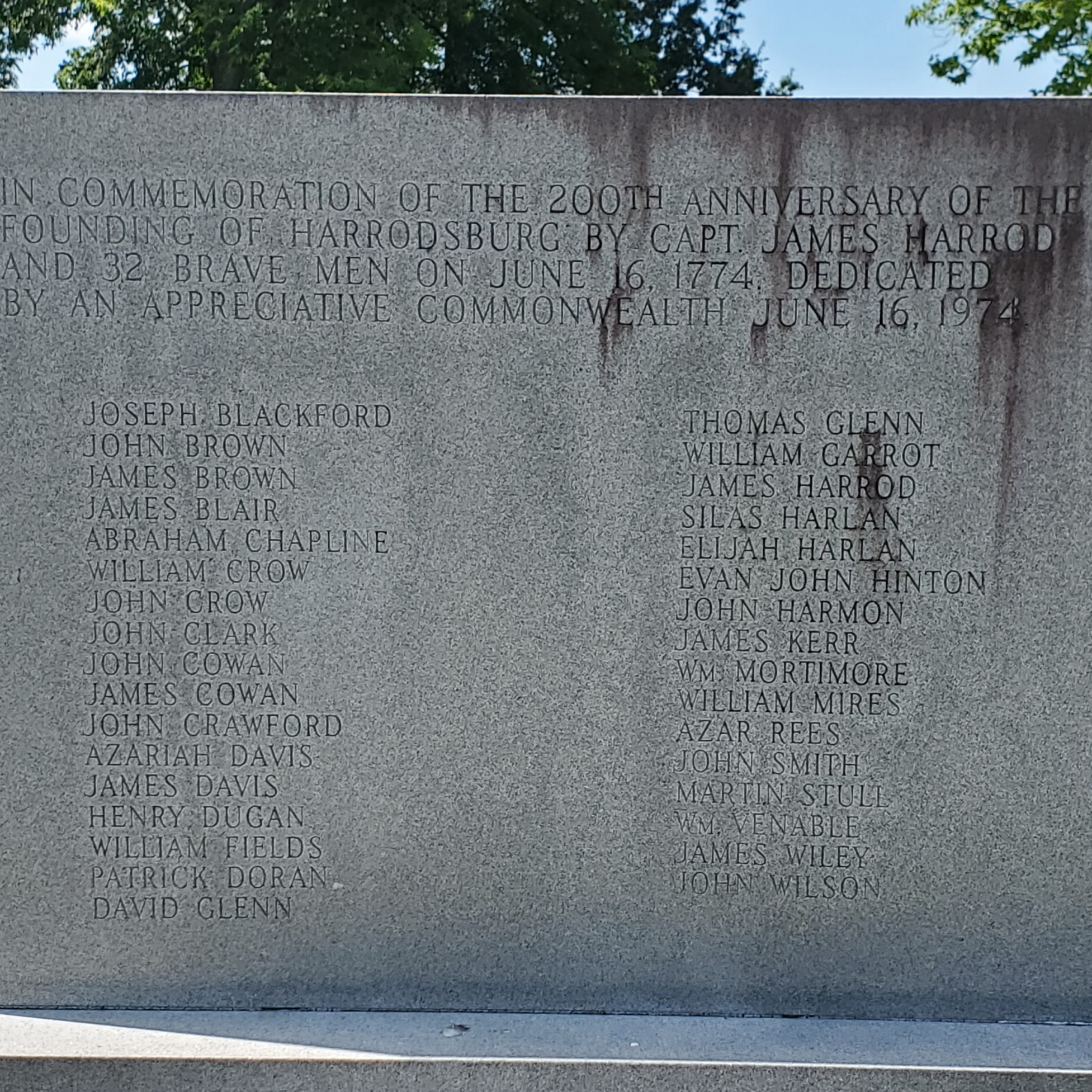
Harrodsburg Memorial

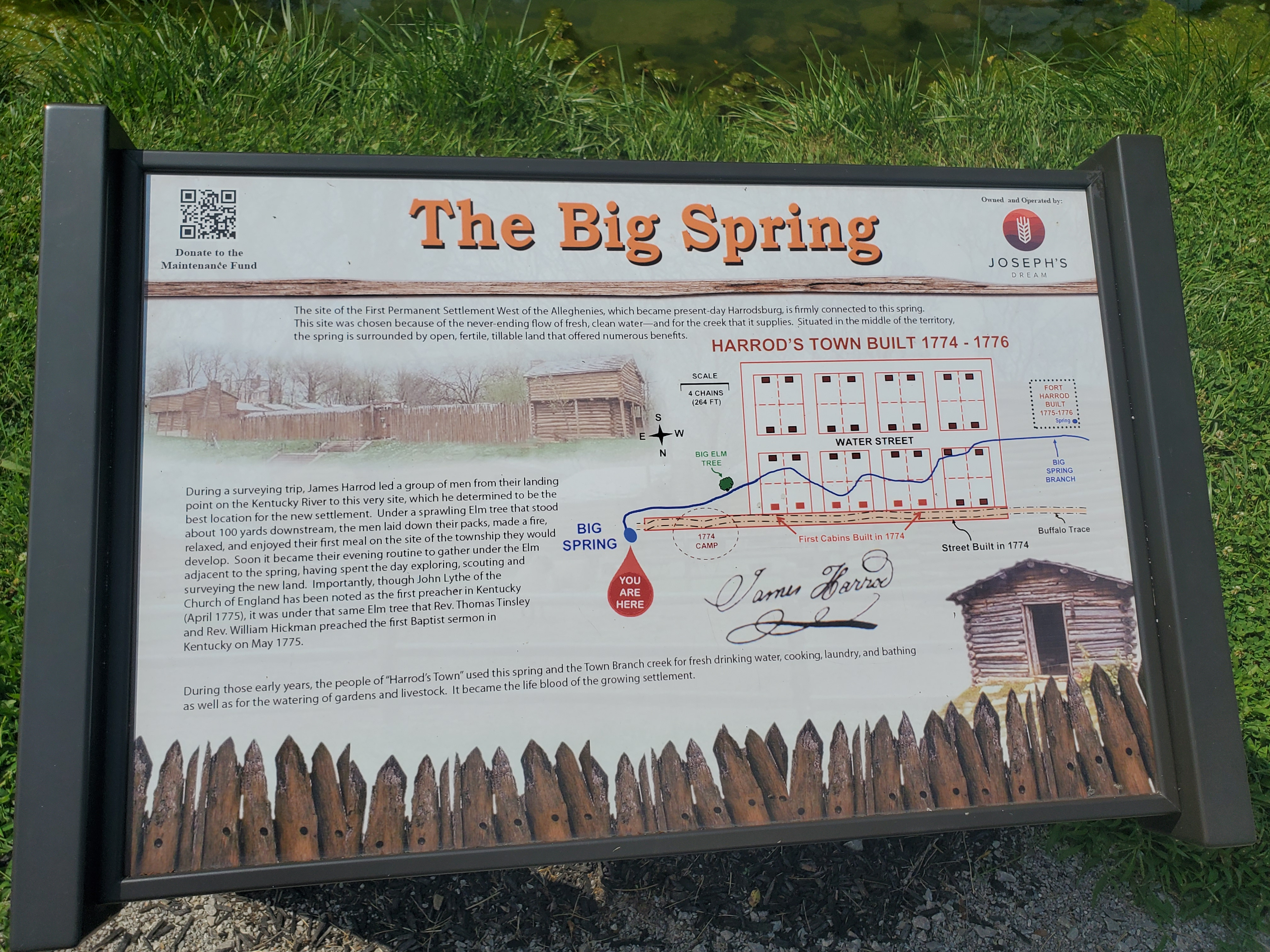
A plaque next to the Big Spring in Harrodsburg Kentucky

Following the Seven Years' War and the Treaty of Fort Stanwix approximately 200,000 acres in present-day Kentucky and West Virginia had been promised by the British Government to the colonial veterans. In 1774, Lord Dunmore ordered an expedition to survey the boundaries of these lands, sending out a few parties led by James Harrod, Thomas Bullitt, Hancock Taylor, and the three McAfee brothers - Robert, James and George.

Harrod departed from Fort Redstone in May, just south of Fort Pitt, and travelled down the Monongahela and Ohio Rivers. At Grave Creek, near present-Moundsville, he assembled his company of 32 men (including David and Thomas Glenn) and then went down the Kentucky River to the current site of Harrodsburg where they laid out the town on June 16.

Tensions had been high between the settlers and the Shawnee for a while, but after the Yellow Creek Massacre and Cresap's War, followed by Logan's retaliation in western Pennsylvania, war became imminent. Lord Dunmore then sent two experienced frontiersmen out to warn John Floyd, Deputy Surveyor of Fincastle County, and the other surveying parties that an Indian war had begun. These two men were Daniel Boone and Michael Stoner and they are said to have completed the round trip of 800 miles in just 64 days. When Boone arrived at Harrodstown, he stayed long enough to build himself a cabin and then went off to continue relaying Dunmore's message to the other surveyors in the area.

Harrod's company still remained at Fort Harrod until July 10 when one of their men was killed, at which point, they set out through the Cumberland Gap for the Holston Valley where they found recruiting for the Fincastle County Battalion. David and Thomas Glenn, along with the majority of the other men, enlisted in the battalion under Captain Harrod's company of Kentucky Pioneers commanded by Colonel Christian. While other battalions marched on to meet the Indians in battle, like General Lewis, who left on September 12, Colonel Christian's men stayed at Camp Union to guard the remaining provisions until the packhorses at Elk Creek could return. Christian's Battalion moved quicker than any of the others, leaving Camp Union on September 27 with supplies and covering 103 miles over eight days, arriving at the mouth of Elk River (now Charleston) on the 8th, 25 miles from the site of the battle. On October 10, still 12 miles away, Christian received a message from General Lewis requesting they hasten for the battle had just commenced. Although they hurried, they arrived at Point Pleasant at 11 o'clock just after the battle had ended.

== Revolutionary War ==
During the early part of the revolution, David Glenn spent the majority of his time exploring the rich Kentucky territory, planting corn along Glenn's Creek (named after his brother, Thomas) and making other improvements from Frankfort down to Russell Springs. However, at the close of 1776, Colonel John Todd had attempted to retrieve some gunpowder at Three Islands (near present-day Manchester) to resupply the Kentucky settlers, but was unsuccessful. In response, Harrod took his small company, which included David Glenn, and on January 2, 1777, they secured the powder and returned to Harrodsburg under the guidance of Simon Kenton, taking the Ohio River down to a hidden buffalo road to avoid conflict with the natives. Had the powder not been delivered to the settlers, they would have been left defenseless and vulnerable to the very frequent Indian attacks.

Glenn proved to be an effective hunter, being tasked with gathering provisions for Harrodsburg's population of ~200 people for quite some time, probably upwards to two years. He and his hunting partner, William Stewart (or Stuart), had a cabin about 50 miles south of Harrod's Station on Russell Creek used for storing meat and supplies where they had spent the winter of 1777-78 separated from the settlement, making several trips back and forth to stock the fort. This area later became Glennsville and is known today as Glens Fork. Interestingly enough, David Glenn is twice counted on the Harrodsburg census of that time, first as "David Glenn" and second as "Glenn and Stuart". Other notable residents of Harrod's Station at the time include Squire Boone, Hugh McGary, Silas Harlan and brothers Isaac and John Bowman.

By the summer of 1778, David Glenn had joined General Clark on his campaigns into the Illinois Territory. As part of Captain John Montgomery's company, he was one of the 175 men who captured Kaskaskia on the night of July 4, 1778 and one of the 170 volunteers who retook Vincennes the following February. Glenn remained in Clark's Illinois regiment at least until the spring of 1780 when he returned to the Falls of Ohio from a winter expedition at Natchez.

In 1780, David Glenn spent more time exploring the Kentucky region with William Stewart, particularly around present day Bardstown. He remained relatively close to Harrodsburg and was still active in the war. One account from 1781 mentions David Glenn avenging a fellow frontiersman, chasing an Indian almost a mile and tomahawking him.

"Samuel Adams, Nathan Linn and David Glenn were some distance below McAfee's Station. Linn was mortally wounded and taken to McAfee's and died that night; and Glenn pursued an Indian whose gun was empty, ran him down - nearly a mile - and tomahawked him." - Mrs. Thomas, who came to Kentucky in 1775.[11]

After the massacre at Blue Licks in 1782, General Clark called for every man on the frontier to volunteer and invade the Shawnee territory, assembling nearly 1,100 mounted rifleman. David Glenn served under Captain Charles Polk's company of militia, part of Colonel Cox's Battalion commanded by John Floyd. The Kentuckians moved quickly enough that the Shawnee weren't able to rally their allies and were routed near Chillicothe after Clark's men burned their villages and crops. This excursion was the last land battle of the Revolutionary War, ending November 10, 1782, with England and America's preliminary peace treaty signed just twenty days later on November 30.

== Personal life ==
Prior to the close of the American Revolution, in 1780, David Glenn claimed lands on behalf of his nephews belonging to his brother, Thomas, who was killed at the Siege of Fort Henry in 1777. Years later, he did the same for his old friend, William Stewart, who had died at the Battle of Blue Licks. Throughout the 1780s he was involved in a number of land disputes, mostly regarding property boundaries; in one instance some alleged Glenn had sold one of his cabin improvements on Glenn's Creek to two different people.

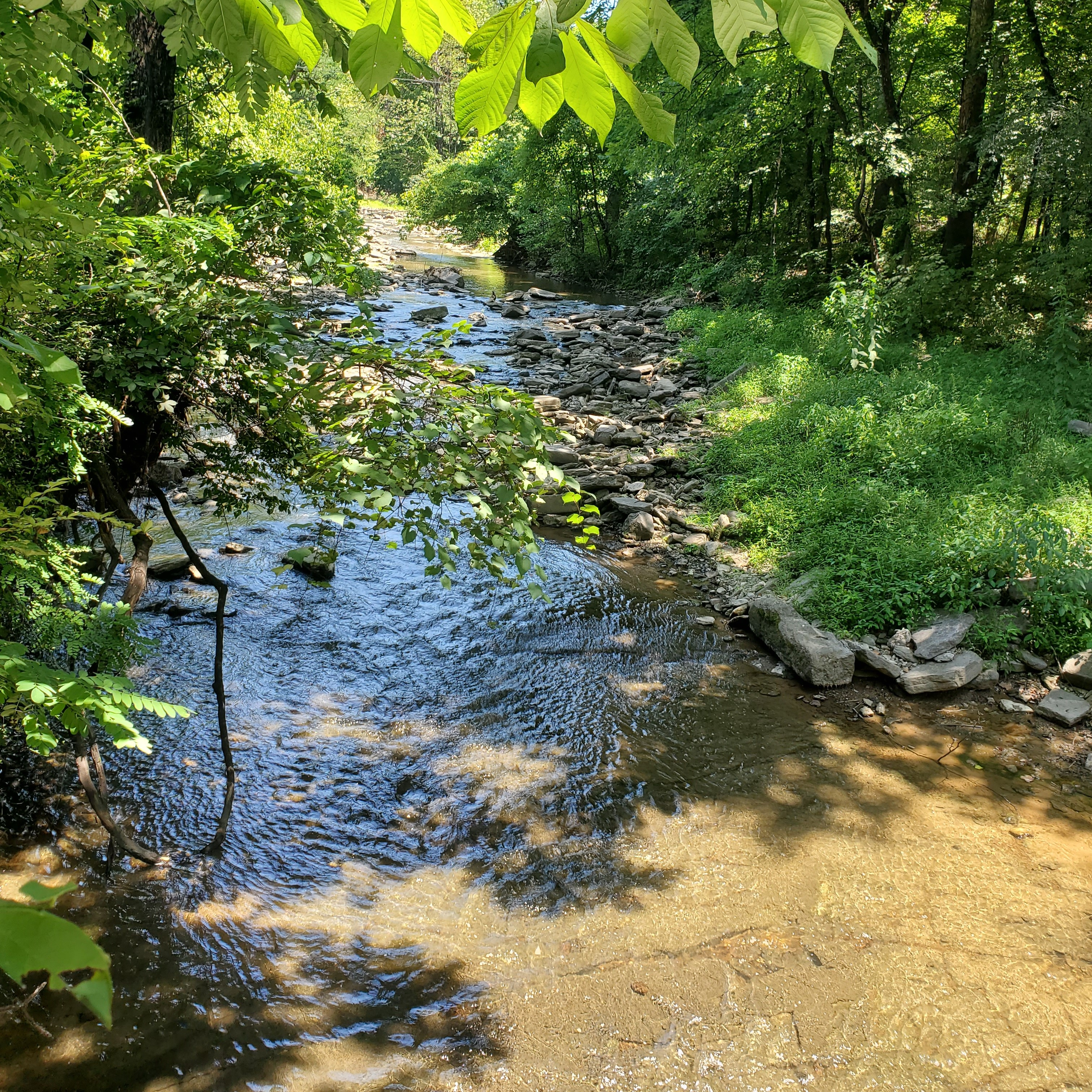
Glenn's Creek in 2020

By 1784 David had married Nancy Brooks in Nelson County and had his first son, moving further west to Yellow Banks in 1797 where he bought 1,200 acres of land close to Glenn's Bridge. As one of the proponents for establishing Ohio County, he was appointed Trustee of Hartford Academy in November 1798 and sworn in as Justice of the Peace in July 1799. He was also Sheriff of Ohio County in 1806. In 1810, Glenn was appointed one of the 14 Ohio County commissioner slots and when Daviess County was formed from Ohio County in 1815, he was again appointed one of the county commissioners.

While established in Yellow Banks, David befriended Bill Smothers and continued spending a good amount of his time hunting. David Glenn died in 1816 at his home in present-day Owensboro. His son William would later serve as colonel of the local "cornstalk" militia during the War of 1812 as well as a representative in the state legislature in 1817 and sheriff of Daviess County from 1821 to 1823.

David Glenn's descendants are the namesake of Glenville in McLean County.
