= Pluggy =

Mingo chieftain

- Tecanyaterighto
- Born: c. 1750
- Died: 29 December 1776 (aged c. 26) (now Georgetown, Kentucky, United States)

Pluggy (Mohawk: Tecanyaterighto, Plukkemehnotee) (c. 1750 - 29 December 1776) was an 18th-century Mingo chieftain and ally of Logan during Lord Dunmore's War. During the American Revolutionary War, he allied with the British and commanded a series of raids against American settlements throughout the Ohio Country and the western frontier of Virginia until his death at McClelland's Station in 1776.

== Life ==
Originally from a Mohawk band, Pluggy gathered a number of Mingo and Haudenosaunee followers and moved westward eventually setting on the site of Delaware, Ohio in 1772. During Lord Dunmore's War, he was one of the most active chieftains allied to the Shawnee conducting extensive raids against settlements as far as western Pennsylvania and western Virginia from his base at Pluggy's Town, 18 miles north of present-day Columbus, Ohio. Despite the peace following the Treaty of Camp Charlotte, Pluggy remained a fierce and particularly hostile enemy after finding "his blood relations lying dead" by Virginian colonists. Throughout the late-1770s, Pluggy's Town was used by Pluggy and other Ojibwe, Wyandots, and Odawas to stage raids against American settlements. In late 1775, he joined the British at the start of western operations in the American Revolution.

In December 1776, Pluggy led a band of thirty warriors up the Ohio and Licking Rivers attacking Harrod's Town on Christmas morning and, later that day, ambushed a 10-man party under John Todd and John Gabriel Jones. The men had been marching down the valley towards the Ohio River, where Jones and George Rogers Clark had stored 500 pounds of gunpowder, when they were attacked killing Jones and another man in the fusillade and capturing another four men in the final charge. The remaining four were able to escape, the story later being told by one of the survivors, pioneer and hunter David Cooper, in the 1987 book The Kentuckians by Janice Holt Giles.

Several days later, he arrived at McClelland's Station, a settlement of thirty families located in present-day downtown Georgetown and defended by twenty settlers including frontiersman Robert Todd, Robert Ford, Robert Patterson, Edward Worthington, Charles White and founder John B. McClelland. On 29 December, Pluggy led between forty and fifty warriors against the fort and retreated after several hours of fighting leaving a number of men dead including Charles White and John McClelland. During the retreat, Pluggy himself was shot and killed by four of the fort's defenders in retribution for the death of McClelland.

He was later buried by members of his tribe on a bluff overhanging the nearby spring and, for a number of years afterwards, a popular legend claimed that the echo heard in the area was the death cry of Pluggy.
