= Glens Fork, Kentucky =

Unincorporated community in Kentucky, United States

Glens Fork
- Unincorporated community
- Location within the state of Kentucky Glens Fork (the United States)
- Coordinates: 37°0′50″N 85°15′2″W
- Country: United States
- State: Kentucky
- County: Adair
- Elevation: 810 ft (250 m)
- Time zone: UTC-6 (Central (CST))
  - Summer (DST): UTC-5 (CDT)
- ZIP code: 42741
- Area codes: 270 and 364
- GNIS feature ID: 492906

Glens Fork is an unincorporated community located in Adair County, Kentucky, United States. Its elevation is 810 feet (247 m).

Glens Fork is located in a region of limestone, so the land is perforated by many sinkholes and small caves. Most of the area is a karst landscape, where rainfall drains directly into sinkholes rather than into streams. There are several undeveloped caves in the region, including the Helms Caves, which contain American Indian artifacts.

== History ==
This community has been variously known as Glens Fork, Glennsville or Glenville (not to be confused with Glenville in McLean County) and “Hardscratch.” It was named for its location on Glens Fork of Russell Creek, which was in turn named after David Glenn, whose hunting party camped in the vicinity while securing supplies for George Rogers Clark's Illinois Campaigns. Glenn and another hunter, William Stewart, were also tasked with supplying meat for the Harrodstown settlers, so they built a cabin here to store the meat at least as early as the fall of 1777 and they ran packhorse trains up to Fort Harrod to supply the commissary. David Glenn was one of Harrod's company of Kentucky Pioneers who founded Harrodsburg in 1774.

The first deed at the Adair County courthouse dates from June 29, 1802, with the post office established on September 2, 1857, and discontinued on July 31, 1863, because of the American Civil War. The post office was re-established on October 10, 1865, and has been in continuous operation since then. The name "Hardscratch" may refer to a Civil War campsite where living was hard.

On March 25, 1872, the town of Glenville was established by an act of the Kentucky General Assembly. The town boundaries were established as one-quarter of a mile in every direction from the northeast corner of the Masonic Hall, which was established as the center of town. At some point, the town government was discontinued, and Glens Fork became an unincorporated place again. The community is home to Archaeological Site 15 Ad 36, which is listed on the National Register of Historic Places.

== Geography ==
Glens Fork is located on Kentucky Route 55 at the northern terminus of KY 900 and the KY 768 overlap.
