= Alfred Francis Russell =

Liberian politician (1817–1884)

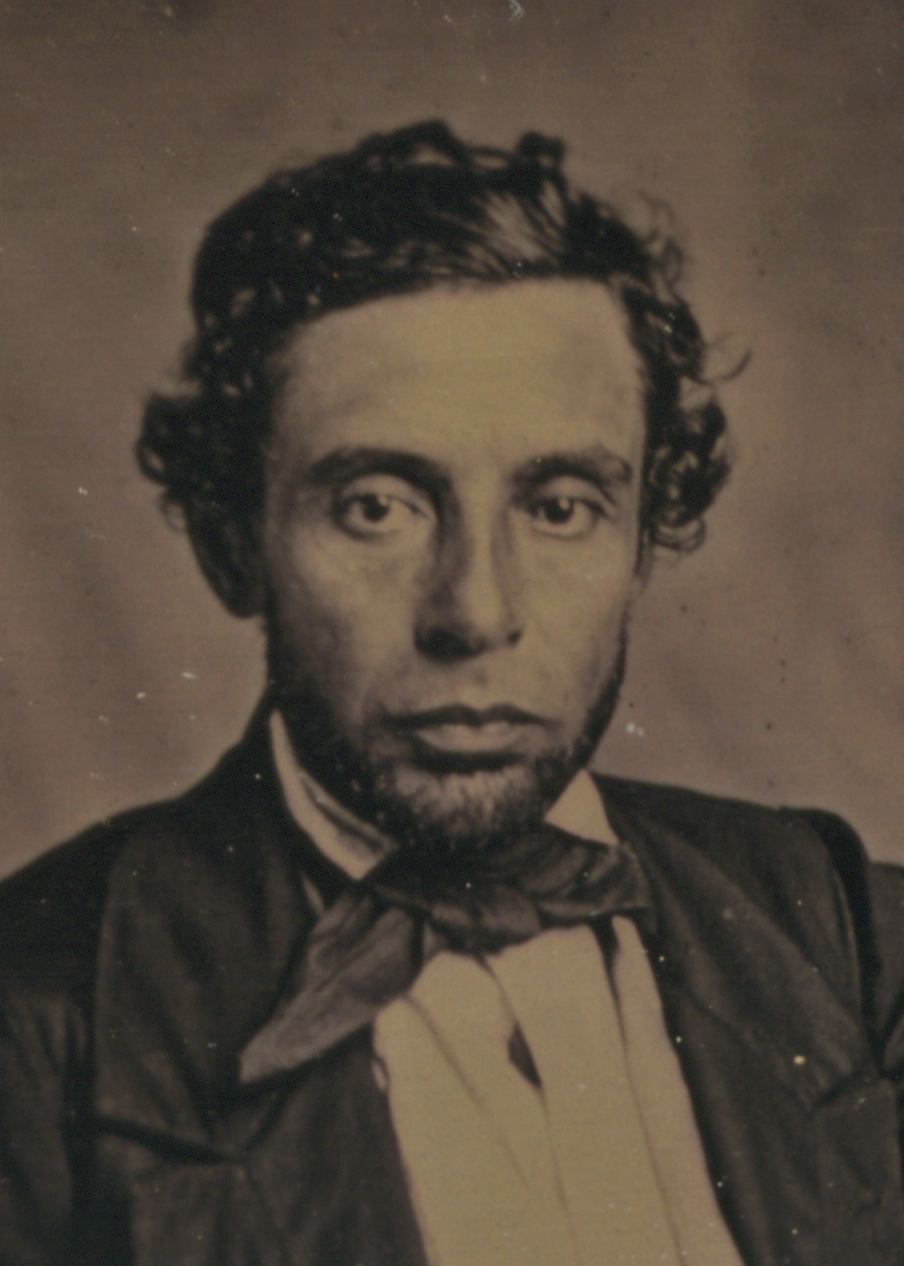

10th President of Liberia
- In office January 20, 1883 – January 7, 1884
- Vice President: None
- Preceded by: Anthony William Gardner
- Succeeded by: Hilary R. W. Johnson

11th Vice President of Liberia
- In office January 7, 1878 – January 20, 1883
- President: Anthony William Gardner
- Preceded by: Charles Harmon
- Succeeded by: James Thompson

Personal details
- Born: August 25, 1817 Lexington, Kentucky, United States
- Died: April 4, 1884 (aged 66) Liberia
- Party: True Whig

Alfred Francis Russell (August 25, 1817 – April 4, 1884) was an Americo-Liberian missionary, planter, and politician who served as the tenth president of Liberia from 1883 to 1884 after serving as vice-president under Anthony W. Gardner, whom he succeeded as president.

Born in Lexington, Kentucky, Russell was emancipated in 1833 (with his mother Amelie "Milly" Crawford) by their mistress Mary Owen Todd Russell Wickliffe (Russell's grandmother through his white father). Wickliffe also emancipated his cousin, Lucretia Russell, and her four children. Both families emigrated together from the United States to Liberia that year. Alfred F. Russell later married and had a daughter by the name of Julia Ann, who later married John Douglas Simpson one of the first black congressmen from Florida, United States. They both had several children including Alpha Douglas Simpson, father of future Liberian vice president Clarence L. Simpson Sr. Alfred Russell served as a Methodist missionary and later owned a large coffee and sugarcane farm. Russell continued to serve as a Methodist minister after entering politics; he was also elected to the Liberian Senate, and served as President Pro Tempore of the Senate of Liberia.

== Early life ==
Russell was born into slavery in 1817 Lexington, Kentucky, as the mixed-race, very white son of Amelie "Milly" Crawford, a mixed-race woman described as octoroon (meaning she was 7/8 European in ancestry). Their owner was Jane Hawkins Todd Irvine. Russell and his mother were the subjects of gossip in Lexington during Russell's youth. Robert J. Breckinridge published a pamphlet revealing that Alfred Francis Russell's father was John Russell, Irvine's grandson and Mary Owen Todd Russell Wickliffe's son from her first marriage. During a summer visit with his grandmother, John Russell, then a student at Princeton University, raped the enslaved octoroon Milly Crawford. Their son, Alfred, then, was overwhelmingly European in ancestry and appearance, reportedly being only 1/16 African.

After Irvine's death in 1822, Alfred Russell and his mother were sold to Irvine's daughter Mary Owen Todd Russell Wickliffe and her husband Robert. (Mary Wickliffe was the mother of John Russell by her late husband James Russell.) Alfred and his mother called their new mistress Mrs. Polly; she was a wealthy heiress of the frontiersman Colonel John Todd. He was the brother of Levi Todd, the grandfather of Mary Todd Lincoln.

In 1833, Mary Wickliffe emancipated Alfred (her grandson by blood) and his mother Milly; she also freed his cousin Lucretia (Lucy) Russell and her four children: Sinthia, Gilbert, George, and Henry, all of whom were of majority-white ancestry. They emigrated that year with nearly 200 other colonists to Liberia on the brig Ajax under auspices of the American Colonization Society; Alfred was fifteen years old when they arrived with other settlers in Liberia on July 11, 1833. Some 146 pioneers survived the voyage; about 30 children died during the voyage.

== Pioneers in Liberia ==
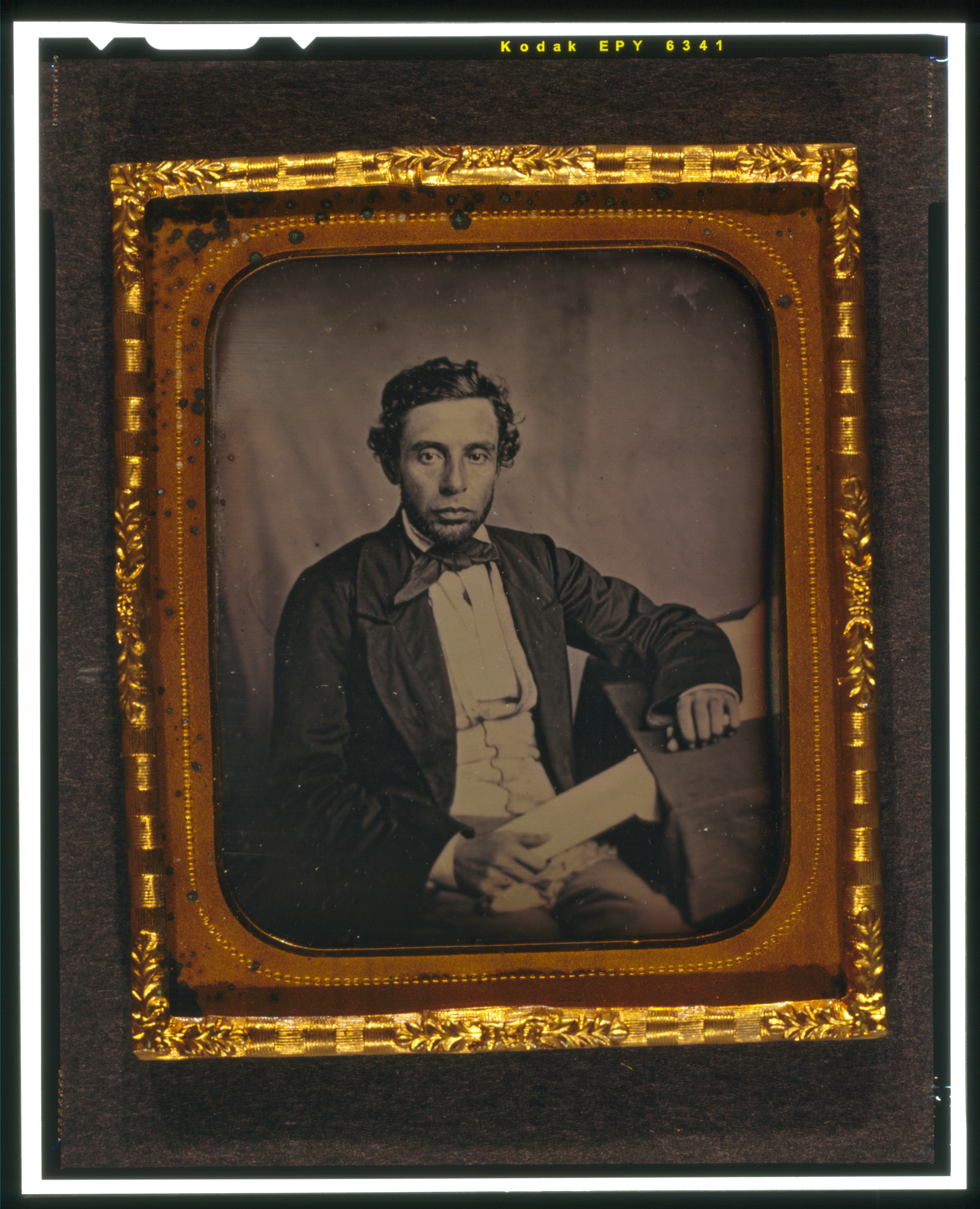
Photograph of Russell in the late 1850s

The Russells were among the last of 1,400 settlers to the colony. Conditions were very harsh for the pioneers; they suffered greatly from local diseases, including malaria, and supplies were extremely short in the colony for some time. "Housing was inadequate, food was scarce, and medical service was almost nonexistent." His cousin Lucy, her daughter Sinthia, and two eldest sons all quickly succumbed to the local fever, which caused ulcers. Sinthia died in 1836 and Gilbert in 1839. Alfred Russell also suffered from this disease, which resulted by 1835 in his having to use a crutch.

Russell's mother Milly married George Crawford, another immigrant. She died in 1845 of "dropsey", and he died the following year. Russell wrote in 1855 of their struggles in Africa: "It was so long before we could find Africa out, how to live in it, and what to do to live, that it all most cost us death seeking life."

Lucy Russell married a man by the surname of Briant. By 1857, she had learned to read and write, as she wrote to her former master Robert Wickliffe from Liberia, asking to be remembered to his daughters and other persons she knew.

== Political career ==
Russell was trained to be a teacher after having suffered an illness that caused an injury in one leg. He later became an Episcopal priest in the St. Paul River area, where he had 200 acres in the Clay Ashland district, purchased for the free people of color by the Kentucky Colonization Society, an affiliate of the ACS. He cultivated sugar cane and coffee, for which he hired indigenous workers.

Russell also became active in politics. In 1881, he ran for vice-president with Anthony W. Gardner, who won the presidency for a third term. When health issues resulted in Gardner's resignation three years later, Russell became president.

== Presidency (1883–1884) ==
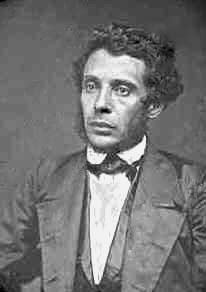
Undated photo

=== Territorial conflict with the British ===
The conflict with the British, which had reached a crisis during the Gardner administration, was still unsolved. Two months after Russell took office, in March 1883, the British Government annexed the Gallinas territory west of the Mano River and formally incorporated it into their colony of Sierra Leone, like Liberia established as a place of resettlement of free blacks and liberated slaves.

Whenever the British and French seemed intent on enlarging at Liberia's expense the neighboring territories they already controlled, periodic appearances by U.S. warships helped discourage encroachment. But successive American administrations rejected appeals from Monrovia for more forceful support. Russell, along with Gardner, has been notably blamed for Liberia's losing much of its territory to the British. This was likely why he was not re-elected to the presidency for a second term.

=== Economy ===
In the decades after 1868, escalating economic difficulties weakened the state's dominance over the coastal indigenous population. As conditions worsened, the cost of imports was far greater than the income generated by exports of coffee, rice, palm oil, sugar cane, and timber. Liberia tried desperately to modernize its largely agricultural economy.

== Death and legacy ==
Russell died, three months after he left office, on April 4, 1884.

Russell is survived by many descendants in Liberia and West Africa, and he was the paternal great-grandfather of Clarence Lorenzo Simpson and great-great-grandfather of Clarence Lorenzo Simpson Jr. He also has collateral paternal Russell relatives in U.S. states such as Maryland, Kentucky, and South Carolina.

== See also ==
- History of Liberia

Political offices
Preceded by Charles Harmon	Vice President of Liberia; 1881–1883	Succeeded by James Thompson
Preceded by Anthony W. Gardner	President of Liberia; 1883–1884	Succeeded by Hilary R. W. Johnson
