= Rocky Point Manor =

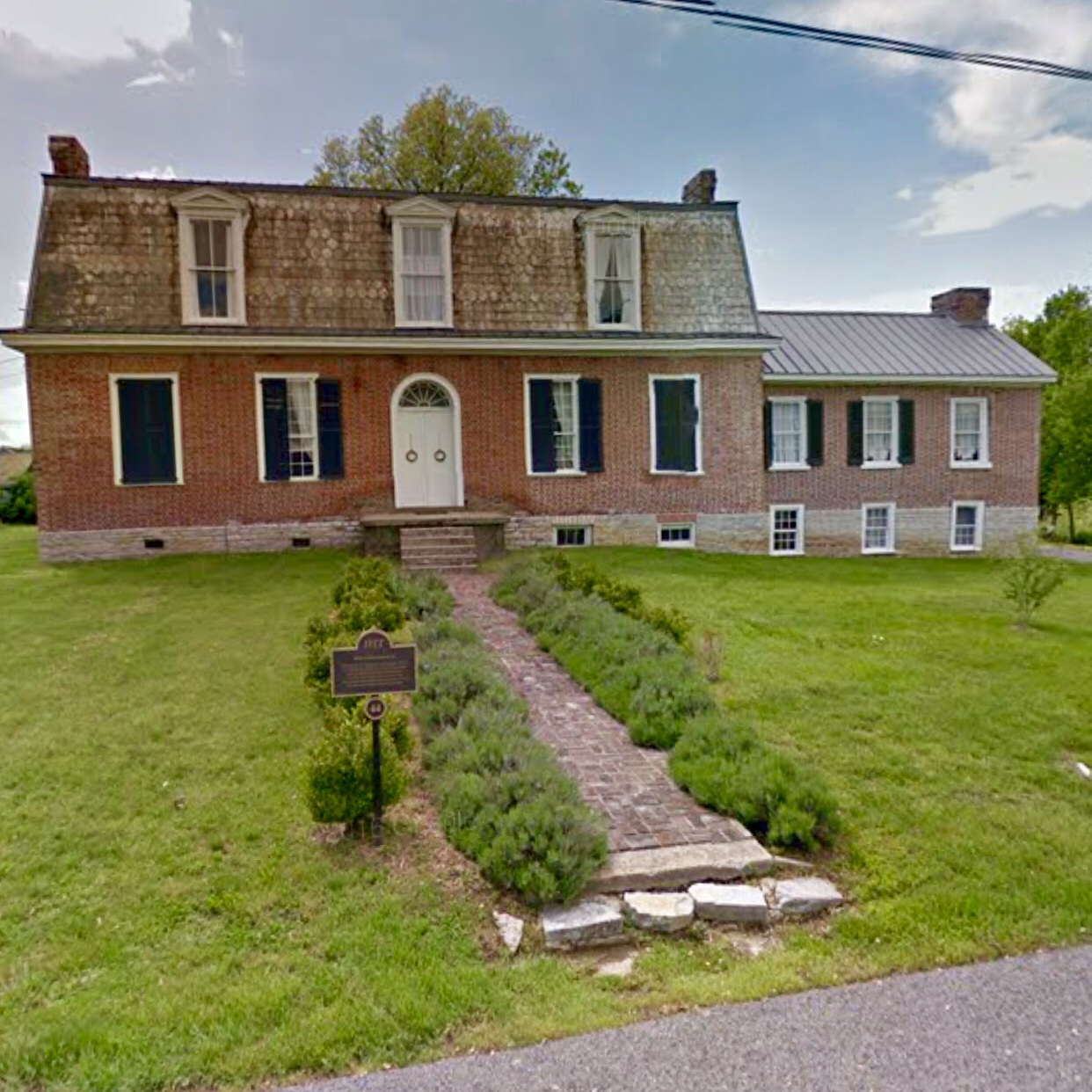
- Rocky Point Manor, Harrodsburg, Kentucky
- Interactive map of the Rocky Point Manor area

General information
- Type: House
- Architectural style: Federal; residual Georgian
- Location: Harrodsburg, Kentucky
- Coordinates: 37°45′40″N 84°50′54″W
- Construction started: 1810
- Governing body: Private

Rocky Point Manor is a Two Story mansion in Harrodsburg, Kentucky. It was built in 1810 for attorney and judge James Haggin. It was considered a grand home for Kentucky during the settlement period, its grounds spanning about 400 acres at the time, and stood next to the historic Fort Harrod.

Following the bloody Battle of Perryville, on October 8, 1862, Rocky Point served as an impromptu field hospital for the wounded, both Union and Confederate soldiers having been treated in its basement, and a crawlspace on the wall having been used as a temporary morgue.

== History ==
Captain John Haggin (1753–1825), was one of the earliest settlers in Kentucky, with his entrance in the spring of 1775. A famous "Indian fighter", he was on numerous occasions the hero attacks against pioneer settlements. Haggin set up a cabin in the place Rocky Point Manor stands today and lived there with his wife and children. The local Shawnee indians burnt his cabin down sometime in the late 18th century or early 19th century, and the family took refuge in the nearby Fort Harrod.

One of Haggin's sons, James Haggin, became a prosperous land attorney and circuit judge and, in 1809, purchased the property in which his father's cabin had once stood and had the manor house built there. The house was built in early Federal style with some residual Georgian features. The house was built with a relative lack of concern for expense and labor; due to cost, it was custom at the time to use common bond on the brickwork on the less significant façades and reserve Flemish bond for the main (front) façade — however, in Rocky Point, Flemish bond was used on all four sides. The woodwork and mouldings in the home, attributed respectively to Matthew P. Lowery, the most famous Federal craftsman of the time, and John Rogers, the most famous foreign architect in Kentucky, are also a testament to the costliness of the house. In around 1822, a wing with similar architectural features was added to the Northern side of the house and beneath it a slave kitchen with an enormous fireplace. A mansard roof was added over the structure sometime in the 1870s. There is also evidence of a summer kitchen, separated from the house (only one brick wall and outline foundation stand today), as well as a carriage house and slave quarters (now demolished).

In October 1862, the Battle of Perryville took place in a nearby field and, after the battle, the basement of the Manor was used as a field hospital and its grounds as a triage station. Many artifacts from that time have been discovered in the crawlspaces of the house or dug up from its backyard, such as Union and Confederate belts, artillery and tableware.

Ownership of Rocky Point Manor changed many times over the years. In the 1940s, the manor was partitioned into apartments, although nothing was ever repaired since, at least 1986, and water damage was rampant.

The house was left abandoned and lost much of its interest as its history became largely unknown. The James Harrod Trust bought it in 2001 for $75,000, but by August 2002, was described by the Kentucky New Era as being "hemmed into a working-class neighborhood of Harrodsburg — decaying and repeatedly vandalized" and was declared among the 12 most endangered historic places by Preservation Kentucky Inc., an advocacy group. It was bought again by a private citizen in 2008, the sister of Justin Engelhardt, which led a restoration of the property.

In 2011, the site was featured on the Travel Channel series Ghost Adventures, in which it was investigated for paranormal activity.
