= John Gabriel Jones =

American lawyer

- Born: June 6, 1752; Williamsburg, Colony of Virginia
- Died: December 25, 1776 (aged 24); Lower Blue Lick, Kentucky
- Occupations: Pioneer, lawyer and politician

John Gabriel Jones (June 6, 1752 – December 25, 1776) was a colonial American pioneer and politician. An early settler of Kentucky, he and George Rogers Clark sought to petition Virginia to allow Kentucky to become a part of the Colony of Virginia at the outset of the American Revolution.

He was named in honor of his uncle, the noted Virginian lawyer Gabriel Jones.

== Biography ==
Born to John Jones and Elizabeth Walker, John Gabriel Jones set out for Kentucky at a young age where he lived for several years and eventually became a prominent lawyer in the region. In June 1776, after a 7-day meeting in Harrod's Town lasting from June 8 to June 15, he and George Rogers Clark were elected by popular vote to represent western Fincastle County as members of the General Assembly of Virginia. Shortly before the two reached Williamsburg however, the state legislature had already adjourned and Jones instead turned back at Richmond to visit the settlements on the Holston River while Clark continued to the capital.

On October 8, Jones and Clark were both in attendance at the fall session and they were successfully able to use their influence to have Kentucky constituted as a county of Virginia by reconstituting Fincastle County into Montgomery, Washington and Kentucky counties, however they were not recognized as members of the assembly. While in Richmond, Clark visited Governor Patrick Henry and managed to acquire 500 pounds of gunpowder from Virginia which was ordered to be shipped to Pittsburgh. They later helped ship the gunpowder down the Ohio River and hid the cargo 11 miles outside of present-day Maysville, Kentucky.

In December, Jones and Colonel John Todd gathered a group of ten men to retrieve the gunpowder. On December 25, as they marched along the Ohio River, they were ambushed near the Lower Blue Lick by a group of warriors led by the Mingo chieftain Pluggy with Jones and several others being killed in the fighting.
