= Robert Todd (pioneer) =

American politician

- Born: April 1754; Province of Pennsylvania
- Died: March 1814 (aged 59); Lexington, Kentucky, United States
- Occupation: Politician
- Known for: Early pioneer and statesman of Kentucky; co-founder of Lexington, Kentucky
- Spouse: Nancy Ann Todd
- Children: Levi; John; Mary; Eliza; Thomas
- Relatives: John Todd (brother); Levi Todd (brother); Robert Smith Todd (nephew); Mary Todd Lincoln (great-niece)

Brigadier General Robert Todd (April 1754 – March 1814) was an 18th-century American pioneer, politician and soldier. As an officer in the Kentucky militia he took part in the western theater of the American Revolutionary War and the Northwest Indian War. Together with his brothers John Todd and General Levi Todd, he was involved in the early economic and political development of Kentucky prior to its admission into the United States in 1792.

== Biography ==
Born in the Province of Pennsylvania as the second son of David Todd and Hannah Owen, he lived with relatives in Virginia as a child and attended the school of his uncle Parson John Todd. He studied law, reportedly in the office of General Andrew Lewis, before moving to Kentucky in the spring of 1776. He was one of the founders of Lexington, Kentucky, and soon became involved in local politics and public affairs in the Fayette County area.

In Kentucky, Todd served in the militia in the western theater of the American Revolutionary War. On December 29, 1776, he was seriously wounded defending McClelland's Station against the Mingo chieftain Pluggy. As a captain, he served under George Rogers Clark during the Illinois campaign (1778–1779). He continued to be involved in defending the Kentucky frontier, participating in expeditions with General Charles Scott. After the death of his brother John at the Battle of Blue Licks in 1782, Robert Todd was elected to succeed his brother as trustee of Lexington on December 12, 1782. He was also assigned by the council to survey the town.

In the Northwest Indian War (1786–1795), he was part of a contingent of mounted volunteers from Lexington and Fayette County that included General James Wilkinson and Thomas Lewis. In 1787, acting on information by local Shawnees, he launched a preemptive strike against a Cherokee raiding party at Paint Creek, killing three warriors and taking seven others prisoner. These men would escape the following day, however. In June 1792, he was appointed a brigadier general and participated in the Battle of Fallen Timbers, commanding the 3rd Kentucky Mounted Volunteers. He kept a personal diary of his experiences in the campaign; it remains unpublished.

Todd served as a delegate for Kentucky County to the Virginia legislature and at least one of the conventions to draft a state constitution. He was also one of the commissioners selected to divide the land in Clark's Grant among the veterans of the Battle of Kaskaskia and Vincennes and later one of the original trustees of Clarksville, Virginia. In 1792, following Kentucky's admission into the United States, Todd represented Fayette County in the first Kentucky Senate, and served as a circuit judge for a number of years. He was again selected as one of three commissioners to choose a location of the new state capital. When the vote was tied between Frankfort and Lexington, he chose in favor of Frankfort as opposed to his hometown. As he possessed roughly 1,000 acres (4.0 km^{2}) near the settlement, he did not want his vote "to be governed by selfish considerations".

He died sometime in March 1814 at the home of his son, Dr. John Todd, in Lexington. Of his six children, his youngest son Thomas J. Todd was a member of the Indiana General Assembly representing Marion County in the Senate from 1843 to 1846. His daughter Eliza was the wife of General William O. Butler.
