= Levi Todd =

18th-century American pioneer (1756–1807)

- Born: October 4, 1756; Montgomery County, Pennsylvania Colony, British America
- Died: September 6, 1807 (aged 50); Lexington, Kentucky, U.S.
- Occupations: Businessman, farmer (Human Enslaver) and civil servant
- Known for: Early pioneer and businessman of Kentucky; co-founder of Lexington, Kentucky
- Spouses: Jane Briggs (m. 1779–1800) Jane Holmes (m. 1802–1807)
- Children: 11, including Robert
- Parent(s): David Todd; Hannah Owen Todd
- Relatives: John Todd (brother); Robert Todd (brother); Mary Todd Lincoln (granddaughter)

Levi Todd (October 4, 1756 – September 6, 1807) was an 18th-century American pioneer who, with his brothers John and Robert Todd, helped found present-day Lexington, Kentucky and were leading prominent landowners and statesmen in the state of Kentucky prior to its admission into the United States in 1792.

He was also the grandfather of Mary Todd Lincoln, the later wife of President Abraham Lincoln, born to his son Robert S. Todd, a longtime clerk of the Kentucky House of Representatives and later representative of Fayette County. His grandson John T. Stuart, born to his daughter Hannah Todd and noted Presbyterian preacher Rev. Robert Stuart, was a prominent Illinois lawyer and a later partner of Lincoln.

Two of his daughters married politicians, Jane Briggs marrying congressman Daniel Breck and Elizabeth Todd marrying Charles Carr, the son of Kentucky statesman Walter Carr.

== Biography ==
=== Early life ===
The youngest son of David Todd and Hannah Owen, Levi Todd was raised and educated with his brothers in Louisa County, Virginia and studied law under General Andrew Lewis. He later followed his brothers to Kentucky arriving with John Floyd to establish the settlement of Lexington in the summer of 1775. Following the completion of the stockade walls, Todd was elected one of four Gentlemen Trustees with David Mitchell, Henry McDonald and Michael Warnock following a town meeting held on March 29, 1776. Over the next year, Todd and the others would begin making plans for the construction of buildings and the eventual expansion of the settlement. In 1777, he was appointed the first clerk of Kentucky County.

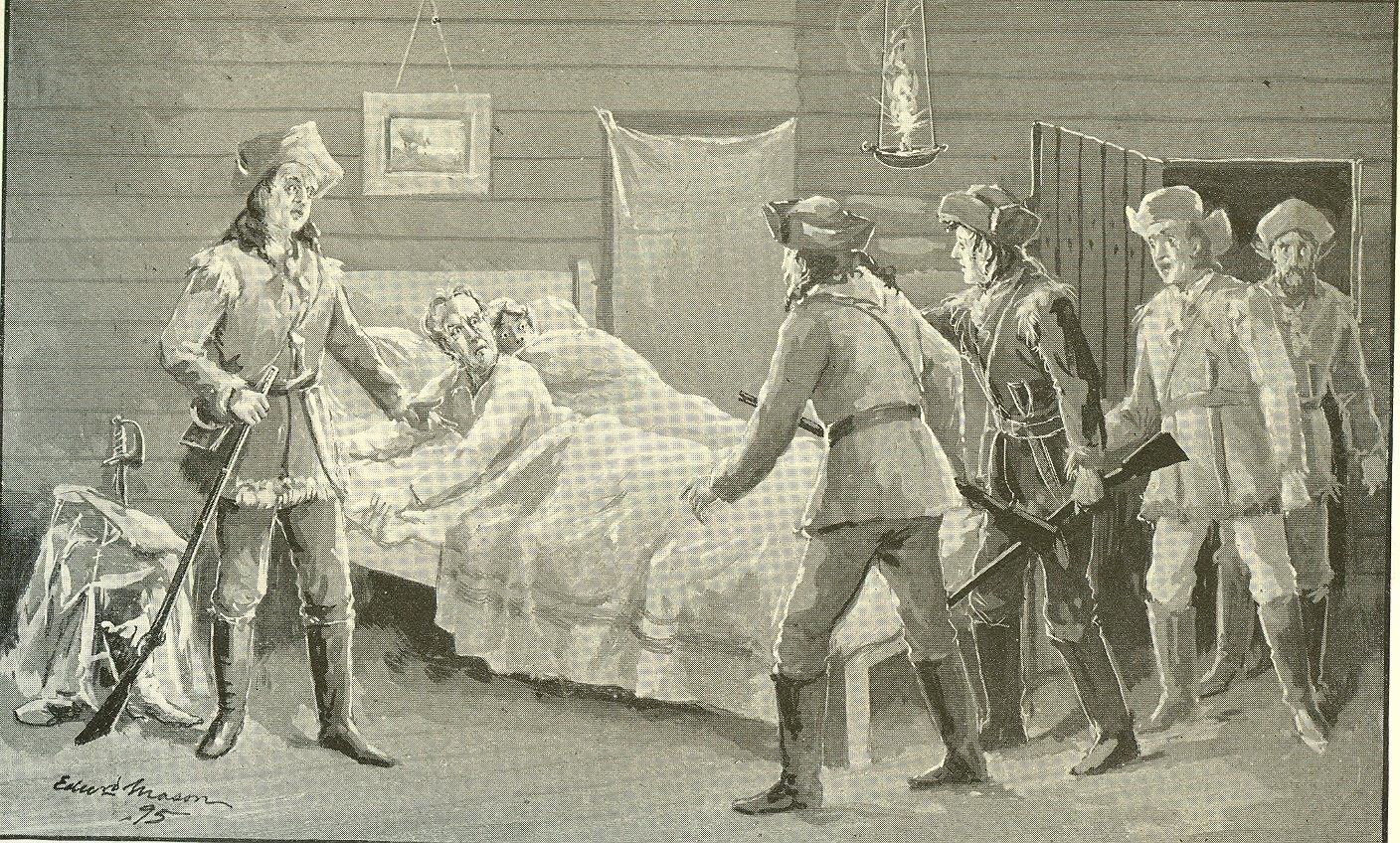
The capture of Rocheblave at Kaskaskia during the Illinois campaign.

Todd and his two brothers fought in the western theater of the American Revolutionary War under General George Rogers Clark during the Illinois campaign and, as a lieutenant, was present at the capture of Kaskaskia in 1778. He was also part of the detachment that captured British agent Philippe-François de Rocheblave and escorted him to Virginia as a prisoner-of-war. He was later awarded 2,156 acres (8.73 km^{2}) of land at Clark's Grant for his service during the campaign.

Following the campaign, Todd and his brothers returned to the settlement to encourage other pioneers to settle in Lexington as well as defend against occasional Indian attacks. He married his first wife, Jane Briggs, at St. Asaphs Fort in Lincoln County on February 25, 1779; they had eleven children. In April, commanding a militia company from Harrod's Town, he took part in Colonel John Bowman's expedition against the Shawnee town of Chillicothe.

During this time, Todd became a farmer as well opening a successful law practice. He accumulated large amounts of land which he bought cheap as land strips from veterans received in lieu of payment by the federal government. His small farm eventually grew to a plantation covering three counties.

That same year, he founded Todd's Station on the northern bank of South Elkhorn Creek on the road the mouth of the Dick's River. Only a short distance from Lexington, he was forced to abandon the station the following summer due to threats of Indian attacks and settled in Lexington permanently.

=== Militiaman and civil servant ===
In 1780, he was appointed court clerk of Fayette County by Governor Isaac Shelby. For twenty-seven years until his death in 1807, he was chiefly responsible for recording depositions, the relinquishment of dowers, furnishing and keeping records of road surveys, making lists of taxable property, issuing marriage licenses, drawing up and keeping deeds and mortgages among other administrative duties. He also acted as one of the first trustees to Transylvania University. Levi was one of the first recorded land holders when the city plans were finally adopted on December 26, 1781. In early 1782, the town council selected a new trustee board which included John Todd and William McConnell.

He also served as a major in the Fayette County Militia and, on August 16, 1782, he led 40 militiamen from Lexington and Boone's Station after receiving news that British Captain William Caldwell and an Indian war party were raiding Bryan's Station, a small fortification five miles (8 km) north of Lexington. Although 17 of his men were able to enter the fort, Todd and the others were forced to pull back. Caldwell attempted to burn down the fort, but was unable to force the Kentuckians to surrender. He eventually retreated the following day, being satisfied with destroying the crops and livestock left outside.

Shortly after this incident, Todd participated in the Battle of Blue Licks, in which his brother John Todd was killed. As county clerk, he wrote the first contemporary account of the battle the following day as directed by his brother Robert Todd. It is considered the more accurate of five accounts available on the battle. He later wrote another account, the fifth and last published, as requested for both civil and military officials as their official report of the battle and included the eyewitness testimony of himself and Daniel Boone. He succeeded Daniel Boone as commander of the militia becoming a major general.

He was also a delegate to the Kentucky statehood conventions in Danville, Kentucky on May 23, 1785, on August 8, 1785, and on September 18, 1787.

=== Later life ===
In 1787, he built the first brick house in Fayette County. Located on Richmond Pike outside Lexington, the house was named after the small Scottish village Ellerslie where the Todd family originated during the 16th century. Originally a one-room-deep, two-story square home on 30 acres (120,000 m^{2}), he hired the first arriving bricklayers and carpenters to expand the house, eventually turning it into a large country villa with an additional 20 rooms elaborately designed both inside and outside the home. The estate had a number of outbuildings, particularly a stone round house where Todd stored the public documents of Fayette County. In 1801, he also donated land on which the oldest standing Presbyterian Church in Fayette County, the Walnut Hill Presbyterian Church, was built.

In 1803, angry tenant farmers and squatters threatened to burn down the home, in an attempt to destroy court documents threatening their property rights as the result of a recent court decision. Although the Ellerslie estate itself was spared, his personal office was burned down by the mob on January 31. As a result, most of the early records of the settlement were destroyed. The remaining records still legible were later copied by a special committee.

At the time of his death in 1807, he owned 7,000 acres (28 km^{2}) in Fayette and Franklin County and was worth over $6,000. Among his possessions included silver, fine china and leather-bound books; his personal library also contained rare works by Mary Wollstonecraft, Edmund Burke and William Blackstone. He also owned twenty-one slaves (he enslaved twenty- one human beings), nine horses and other livestock, and a carriage. He was buried in Lexington Cemetery.

The family home was inherited by Robert S. Todd, who in turn left it to Margaret Preston in 1857, before its purchase by the Lexington Water Company in 1884. The company used several 100 acres (400,000 m^{2}) to build a reservoir as well as present-day Mentelle Park; the house itself existed until 1947 when it was torn down to build the now defunct Lexington Mall.
