= David Huddleston (disambiguation) =

David Huddleston (1930–2016) was an American actor.

David Huddleston may also refer to:

- David Huddleston (general), Canadian general
- David Huddleston (gymnast), Bulgarian gymnast
- David Huddleston (politician), American politician
- David Winfield Huddleston, American minister
