= Mercer County Senior High School (Kentucky) =

Location
- 1124 Moberly Road; Harrodsburg, Kentucky; United States
- Coordinates: 37°47′02″N 84°51′31″W

Information
- Former names: Harrodsburg High School; Mercer County High School
- Type: Public high school
- Motto: Always Compete
- Established: 2006; 20 years ago
- School district: Mercer County Schools
- Principal: Spencer Tatum
- Teaching staff: 41.00 (FTE)
- Grades: 9–12
- Enrollment: 753 (2023–2024)
- Student to teacher ratio: 18.37
- Campus: Rural
- Colors: Blue; Red
- Team name: Titans
- Website: mcsh.mercer.kyschools.us

Mercer County Senior High School is a public secondary school located in Harrodsburg, Kentucky, United States.

== Establishment ==
In May 2006, the Harrodsburg Independent School District and the Mercer County School District voted to consolidate with each other. The Harrodsburg District voted 4–1 and the Mercer County District voted 5–0. Due to the merger, Mercer County High School and Harrodsburg High School merged to form the new Mercer County Senior High School. The school was chartered in the 2006–2007 school year. In 2014, the school expanded its campus to include the 9th Grade, which formerly attended a separate building known as the Freshman Academy.

== Athletics ==
Several sports are offered at MCSHS including:

- Baseball
- Boys' Basketball
- Boys' Golf
- Boys' Soccer
- Boys' Tennis
- Boys' Track
- Cross Country
- Football
- Girls' Basketball
- Girls' Golf
- Girls' Tennis
- Girls' Track
- Softball
- Volleyball

== Football ==
In 2006, the football team won the KHSAA Class 2A State Championship under head coach Marty Jaggers. Even though the team consisted of two combined squads from the original Mercer County High and Harrodsburg High, the 2006 squad was allowed to compete in Class 2A because it was too late to alter football schedules for that season. The following year, the Kentucky High School Athletic Association updated Kentucky's 4-class system to a 6-class system, and Mercer County Senior High School was moved to Class 5A to reflect its merger with Harrodsburg High School.

== Band ==
The band won Class AA State Championships in 2005 and 2006 under the direction of Jeffrey Meadows. The squad returned to the state finals (4A) in 2008 and 2009, and finished fourth overall.

== Clubs ==
Several Clubs are offered at MCSHS including:

- 4-H Club
- Art Club
- Beta Club
- Book Club
- Drama Club
- FCA
- FCCLA
- FFA
- HOSA
- ITS
- Key Club
- NHS
- Poetry Club
- Music Club
- Republican Club
- Chess Club
- Y-Club
- Pep Club
