= Mercer County Schools =

Mercer County Schools may refer to:

- Mercer County Schools (Kentucky)
- Mercer County Schools (West Virginia)
