= Battle of Chillicothe =

1779 battle

Coordinates: 39°43′50″N 83°56′16″W

- Part of the American Revolutionary War
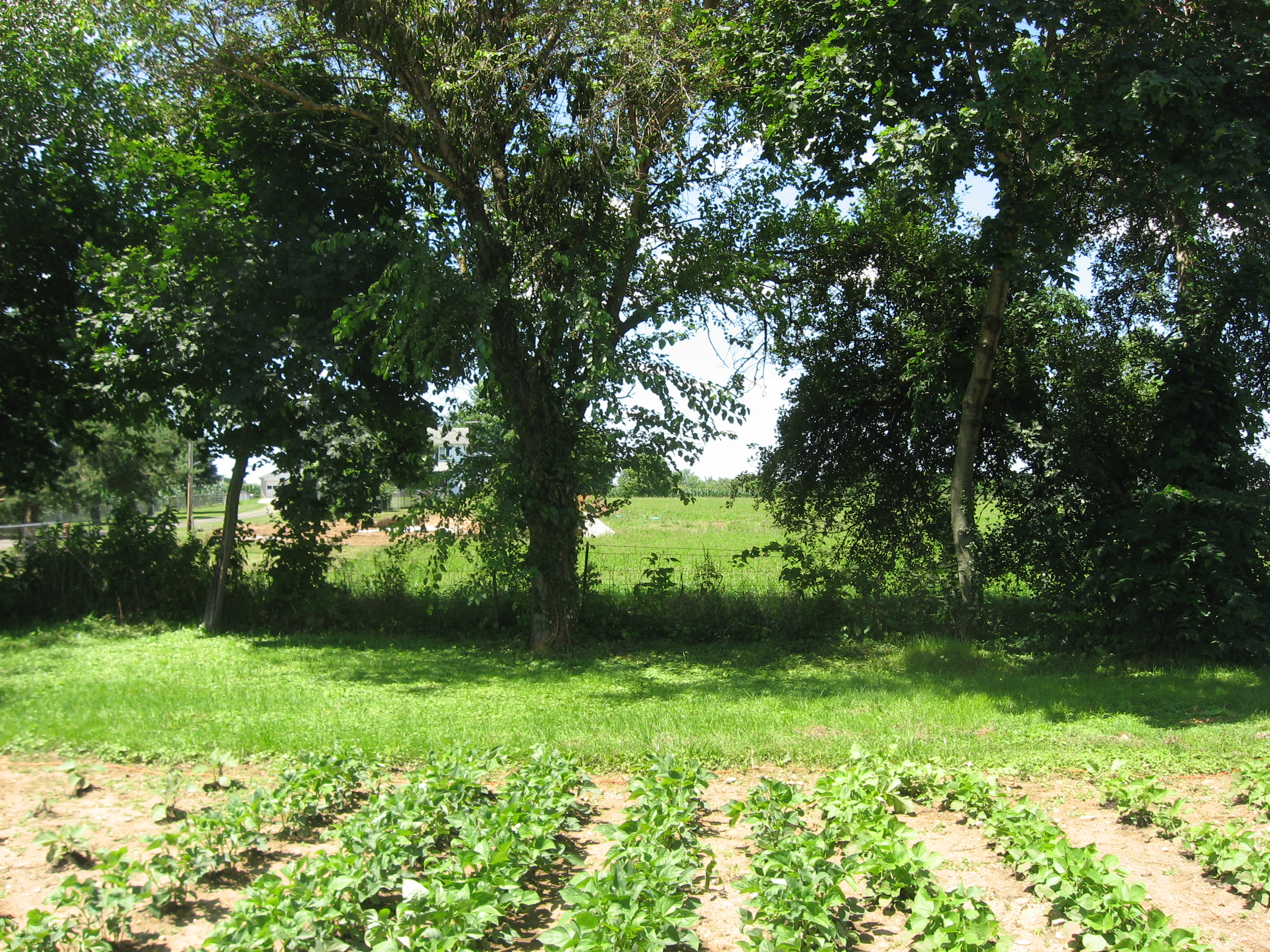
- A photograph of the site of Old Chillicothe
Date	May 29, 1779
Location	Old Chillicothe, Ohio Country
Result	American victory

Belligerents
United States	Shawnee

Commanders and leaders
John Bowman; Benjamin Logan; Levi Todd	Blackfish (DOW)

Strength
296 militia	Unknown

Casualties and losses
8 killed and 4 wounded	4–5 killed

The Battle of Chillicothe was a military engagement of the western theater of the American Revolutionary War. In May 1779, Colonel John Bowman of the Kentucky County militia, accompanied by Benjamin Logan and Levi Todd, led between 160 and 300 militiamen against the Shawnee settlement of Old Chillicothe. Dividing their forces, Bowman and Logan attacked the town from two sides but were eventually repulsed. Unable to draw the Shawnee from their single blockhouse, Bowman burned much of the town and left with 163 horses valued at $32,000. Although initially blamed for a defeat, as well as the dozen casualties suffered by the Americans, Bowman and Logan were eventually credited by some with a major victory for the Patriots. With the destruction of a major Shawnee settlement and the death of Blackfish, additional war parties were discouraged from moving against American settlers in Kentucky. According to Theodore Roosevelt in The Winning of the West, "the expedition undoubtedly accomplished more than Clark's attack on Piqua next year."
