= Jane T. H. Cross =

American novelist (1817–1870)

- Born: Jane Tandy Chinn; 1817; Harrodsburg, Kentucky, U.S.
- Died: October 1870 (aged 52–53); Elizabethtown, Kentucky, U.S.
- Occupation: author
- Spouses: James Pendleton Hardin (m. 1835; died 1842); Joseph Cross (m. 1848)
- Children: 3
- Writing career
- Language: English
- Genres: novel; short story; travel letters

Jane T. H. Cross (née, Chinn; after first marriage, Hardin; after second marriage, Cross; 1817 – October 1870) was an American writer. She was, for some years, an occasional contributor of prose and poetry to the religious journals of the South. She wrote a series of stories for children, which were collected and edited by Dr. Summers, and published in four small volumes, called, Wayside Flowerets, Heart Blossoms for My Little Daughters, Bible Gleanings, and Driftwood. Gonzalo de Cordova was a translation from the Spanish; Duncan Adair, was a novel; and Azile, was a story partly of Southern experiences during the American Civil War. Upon her return from Europe, her letters from abroad were collected and published.

== Early life and education ==
Jane Tandy Chinn was born in Harrodsburg, Kentucky, 1817. She was the oldest daughter of Judge Christopher Chinn (1789–1868), of that place. Her mother was Sarah W.S. (née Hardin) Chinn (1787–1864). Cross was educated at Shelbyville, Kentucky, at Mrs. Tevis's boarding-school.

Cross first learned to love letters and books when she was a child. she listened to the stories of "Cinderella", "Little Red Ridinghood", "Beauty and the Beast". Later, she read the works Sir Walter Scott, Lord Byron, Felicia Hemans, Mary Martha Sherwood, Hannah More, Maria Edgeworth, Amelia Opie, Edward Bulwer-Lytton, and Charles Dickens. When she was a young child, she had a fancy for writing rhymes, which she called poetry. When a Kentucky election would come on, she would sometimes write a handbill on a half-sheet of paper for some favorite candidate, to be read by the members of her family. The thought of writing a novel would sometimes cross her girlish mind, but in a very indefinite, far-off way. She had every educational advantage the state afforded and availed herself of them fully.

It is probable Cross wrote for newspapers and magazines from her girlhood.

== Career ==
She was scarcely eighteen when she married James Pendleton Hardin (1810–1842), of her native state. He was the son of Hon. Ben Hardin. After marriage, she accompanied him to Cuba, where he was forced to go for his health. He lived only seven years after marriage, leaving her with three young children to support, including Elizabeth Pendleton Hardin (b. 1839) and Jamesetta Pendleton Hardin (1840–1927).

In six years, she married Rev. Dr. Joseph Cross (1813–1893), then a prominent Methodist, later, a minister of the Methodist Episcopal Church, South, He was a professor belles-lettres at Transylvania University, Lexington, Kentucky. Cross was devoted to her church, and a helpmate to her husband. Two years were spent in Kentucky, two in Tennessee, five months in Alabama, and four years in South Carolina. Then they traveled in Europe a year and returning to Spartanburg, South Carolina, engaged in teaching. For twenty years, she devoted herself with success to the education of young women. In 1859, they moved to Texas, where she remained until she "refugeed" to Georgia during the American Civil War.

With the exception of an occasional New Year's Address, or a short story, Cross wrote nothing for publication until about the year 1851, when she commenced writing for a Sunday-school paper, edited by Dr. Summers, in Charleston, South Carolina. For that journal she wrote Wayside Flowerets, Heart Blossoms for My Little Daughters, Bible Gleanings, and Driftwood. These were afterwards published in book form, by Dr. Summers, and made four Sunday-school volumes. Her Southern sentiments were so intense in favor of the Confederacy that she and her daughters were imprisoned at Camp Chase for six months for waving their handkerchiefs to John Hunt Morgan's troops. Six Months under a Cloud, a series of letters filled with incidents of prison life, was written after they were released, and received with enthusiasm by her readers. She was known to the literary world before this, for while in Europe, she published a series of letters under the title of "Reflected Fragments" in the Christian Advocate, Charleston Courier, Nashville Southern Advocate, and other periodicals. She has also contributed for years to the Home Circle, of Nashville, Tennessee. While in Georgia, she published From the Calm Center.

Cross spoke French, Italian and Spanish fluently. Her translation of a Spanish story gives us an idea of her knowledge of that language. Her poetry is usually very sad. The poem "To Mariana Cross" was characterized as "touchingly beautiful". It was written in memory of her only child by her second marriage, Mariana Julia Cross (1853–1867), who died at the age of 14.

== Personal life ==
Cross was early a Christian, but in her mature years, grew more devout. She died in Elizabethtown, Kentucky, in October 1870. The following tribute was paid by one of her former pupils, Mrs. E. B. Smith, of Georgia:

"Mrs. Cross was a remarkable woman in many respects. Her genial feeling, and her elegant manners rendered her a delightful companion. As a conversationalist she was unequaled. She was for more than twenty years a teacher, and she was eminently qualified for that profession. She seemed to discover intuitively the mental caliber of her scholars, their strong and weak points, and inspired them with ambition and zeal. Her sympathy and interest in their duties, her lectures, reading and varied means of imparting information, assured her a success rarely equaled. Her personal magnetism was great, and she gave an impetus for good to many who have since taken their places as useful and exemplary members of society. Rest thee, sweet spirit! Thy blessed words, thy prayers, thy tears, thy holy life, will purify and point many to an immortality with thee in heaven."

== Selected works ==
- A trip to the Mammoth Cave, 1852
- Bible Gleanings, 1853
- Driftwood, 1855
- Wayside Flowerets, 1855
- Duncan Adair, or, Captured in escaping : a story of one of Morgan's men, 1864
- Azile, 1868
- Heart Blossoms for My Little Daughters, 1876
- Six Months under a Cloud
- From the Calm Center
- Gonzalo de Cordova
