= Walnut Hill Presbyterian Church =

Meeting house in Kentucky, United States

- Walnut Hill Church
- U.S. National Register of Historic Places
- Location within Kentucky Location within the United States
- Nearest city: Lexington, Kentucky
- Coordinates: 37°58′07″N 84°25′29″W
- Area: 9.5 acres (3.8 ha)
- Built: 1801, 1880
- NRHP reference No.: 73000801
- Added to NRHP: May 7, 1973

Walnut Hill Church is a historic Presbyterian church meeting house in Lexington, Kentucky. The church building was constructed in 1801 on land donated by Mary Todd Lincoln's grandfather Levi Todd.

It replaced a log meetinghouse which had been built in 1785. It is a stone 40 by 50 feet (12 m × 15 m) structure which had two rows of square windows. It was renovated in 1880; the renovation replaced the square windows with Gothic shaped ones. Stone front steps were donated in 1900.

The building was added to the National Register of Historic Places in 1973.
