= John Haggin =

Early settler of Kentucky

Captain John Haggin
- Born: c. 1753; Winchester, Virginia
- Died: 1 March 1825 (aged 71-72); Harrodsburg, Kentucky
- Resting place: Spring Hill Cemetery, Harrodsburg
- Known for: Early Kentucky settler
- Spouse: Agness Nancy Gibbs
- Parent(s): Samuel Haggin and Mary Florence Fairfax

Captain John Haggin (c. 1753 – 1 March 1825) was one of the earliest settlers of Kentucky, arriving in the spring of 1775 with his wife's uncle, Col. John Hinkston. A famous "Indian fighter", he was on numerous occasions the hero of attacks against pioneer settlements, was dispatched on many expeditions, and was involved in many other aspects of the New West.

== Biography ==
Haggin was born in about 1753, in Winchester, Virginia, son of Samuel Haggin and Mary Florence Fairfax. He moved to western Pennsylvania, where he married Agness Nancy Gibbs (later fathering twelve children). He served in Dunmore's campaign in 1774. He went to Kentucky the following spring, one of the first settlers of the state.

The next year he brought out his family and built a cabin on Hinkston's fork of the Licking River, but because of Indian hostilities he removed that summer to McClelland's Station, on the site of the modern Georgetown. He was camped with a group of "long rifles" on the site of present-day Lexington, Kentucky when they received news of the inauguration of the American Revolutionary War. The hunters named their encampment Lexington, after the Battle of Lexington. Haggin was very politically active in the movement toward Kentucky statehood and was a judge on the first Kentucky Court of Appeals.

Court records show that John Haggin had a racetrack in Harrodsburg before 1785, as there were prosecutions for disorderly behavior there, well before better known claims to the first racetrack in Kentucky (those made for William Whitley, who opened a track in 1788 in Lincoln County, and a Lexington track which opened in 1789). Haggin's track was thus one of the earliest if not the earliest racetrack in Kentucky.

By the time of his death he had acquired vast land holdings and great wealth. Unlike some of his fellow entrepreneurial contemporaries, he was seen as honorable and industrious and apparently instilled those values in his offspring.
