= Beaumont Inn =

Coordinates: 37°45′09″N 84°50′34″W

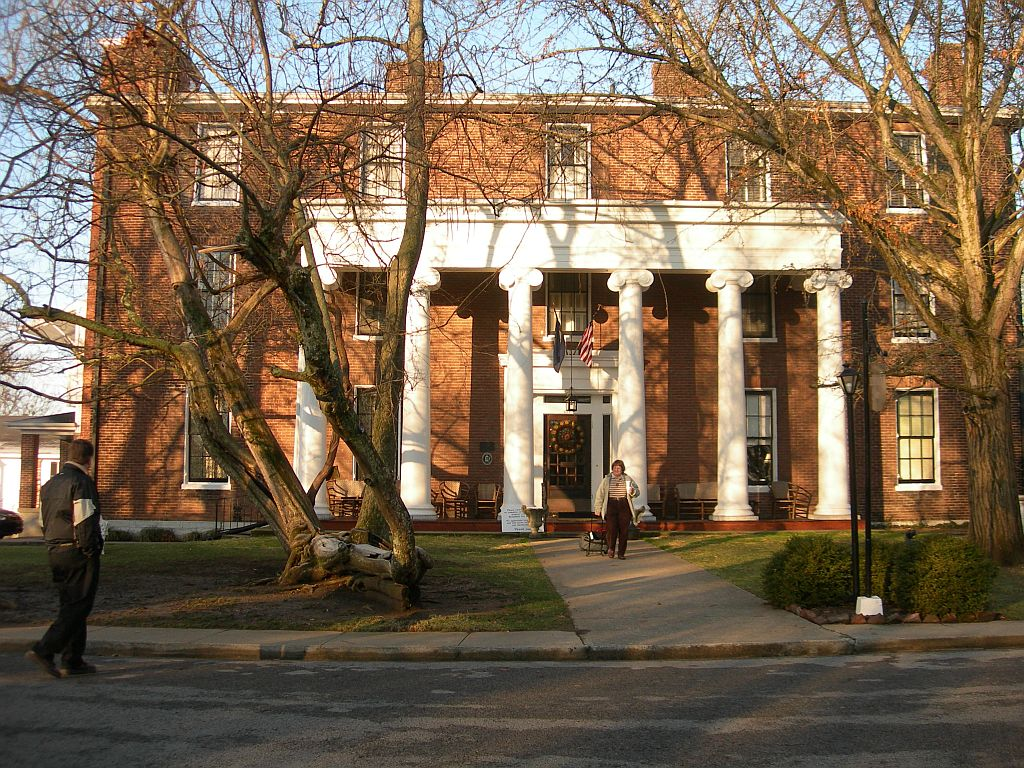
- Exterior of the building

General information
- Architectural style: Federal
- Location: Harrodsburg, Kentucky
- Address: 638 Beaumont Inn Drive
- Completed: c. 1845

Technical details
- Floor count: 3
- Awards and prizes: James Beard American Classic Award

The Beaumont Inn in Harrodsburg, Kentucky is a historic inn and restaurant established around 1845. It was the campus of several women's colleges until it was purchased by Annie Bell Goddard and converted into an inn in 1918.

== History ==
The inn is a three-story brick building in the Federal architectural style. It has a total of 31 guest rooms. The building was built around 1845, and was the campus of several women's colleges including the Greenville Institute, Daughters College and Beaumont College. Its construction cost a total of $10,000. At the time of its completion, it was described as "an elegant brick mansion" and was designed to accommodate around 100 students.

Two former alumni of the college, Annie Bell Goddard and May Pettibone Hardin, purchased the building for $7,800 in 1917, after Beaumont College had closed. Goddard had previously taught mathematics at the college and served as its dean. After Goddard became sole owner, she converted it into an inn in 1918 which catered to former alumni of the colleges. It has subsequently been operated by descendants of Goddard's daughter Pauline Dedman.

The inn is known for serving Southern cuisine. The restaurant originally served only two main dishes, country ham and fried chicken. In 1949, American food critic Duncan Hines described it as the best restaurant in Kentucky and wrote that "I’ll be happy to get home and eat two-year-old ham, cornbread, beaten biscuits, pound cake, yellow-leg fried chicken, and corn pudding." Hines included the inn in each volume of Adventures in Good Eating at Home. It received a James Beard American Classic Award in 2015.
