= Old Fort Harrod State Park =

Park in the U.S. state of Kentucky

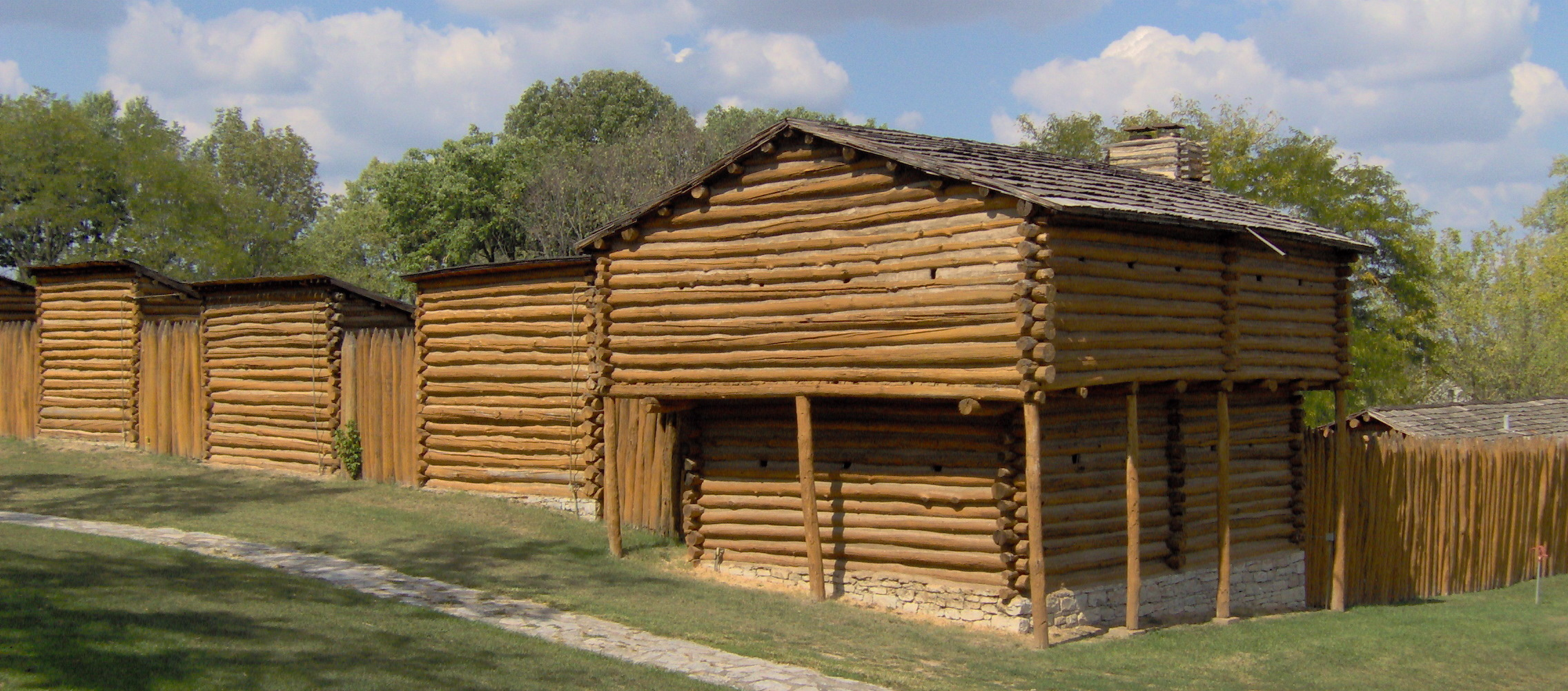
- The reconstructed fort at the center of Old Fort Harrod State Park

- Location within Kentucky Location within the United States
- Type: Kentucky state park
- Location: Harrodsburg, Kentucky, United States
- Coordinates: 37°45′43″N 84°50′56″W
- Area: 15 acres (6.1 ha)
- Elevation: 873 ft (266 m)
- Established: 1927
- Administrator: Kentucky Department of Parks
- Website: Official website
- Pioneer Memorial State Park
- U.S. National Register of Historic Places
- U.S. Historic district
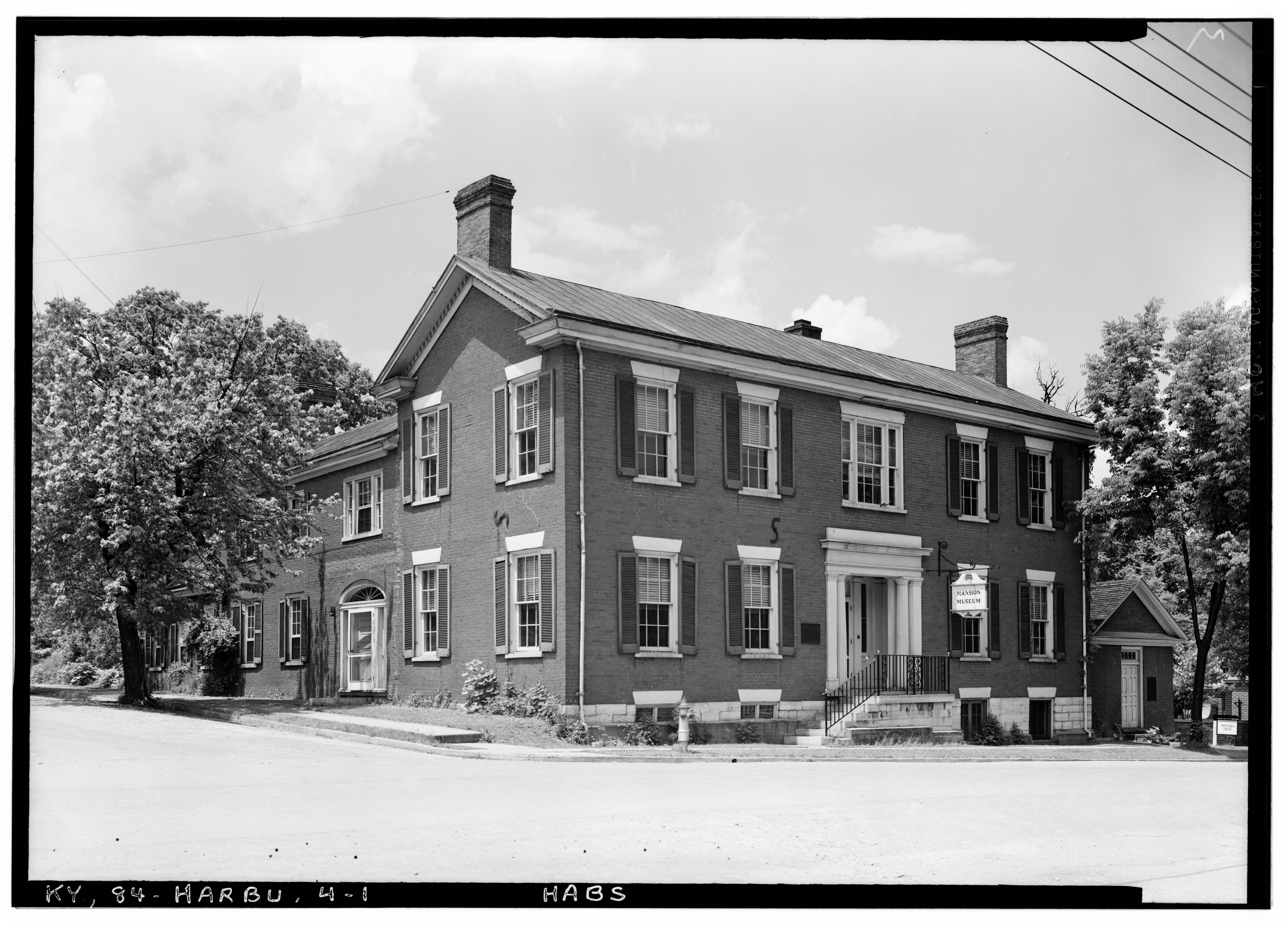
- The mansion in 1940
- NRHP reference No.: 88003377
- Added to NRHP: February 9, 1989

Old Fort Harrod State Park is a park located in Harrodsburg, Kentucky in the United States. The park encompasses 15 acres (6.1 ha) and features a reconstruction of Fort Harrod, the first permanent American settlement in the state of Kentucky. The fort was named after James Harrod, who led an early party of settlers into Kentucky.

The park was founded in November 1934 as Pioneer Memorial State Park, and dedicated by President Franklin D. Roosevelt and Governor Ruby Laffoon.

== Attractions ==
The park features several attractions: the replica of the old fort, the Mansion Museum, the George Rogers Clark Federal Monument, Lincoln Marriage Temple, and oldest cemetery west of the Alleghenies.

The reconstructed fort contains several log structures representing various aspects of military frontier life, including a militia blockhouse, a family blockhouse, several cabins demonstrating pioneer life, a blab school, the minister's cabin, and the leader's cabin. (The actual site of the original fort is under the current parking lot.)

The Mansion Museum is a Greek Revival home that contains American Civil War artifacts, a McIntosh gun collection, paintings, documents, music collections, Abraham Lincoln memorabilia and Native American artifacts.

The Lincoln Marriage Temple is a brick structure, housing the reconstructed log cabin where Abraham Lincoln's parents, Thomas Lincoln and Nancy Hanks, were married.

The George Rogers Clark Federal Monument (not to be confused with the George Rogers Clark National Historical Park in Vincennes, Indiana) was designed by architect Francis Keally and sculptor Ulric Ellerhusen.

The park also has the so-called 'Big Ole Tree', the largest Osage Orange tree in the US.

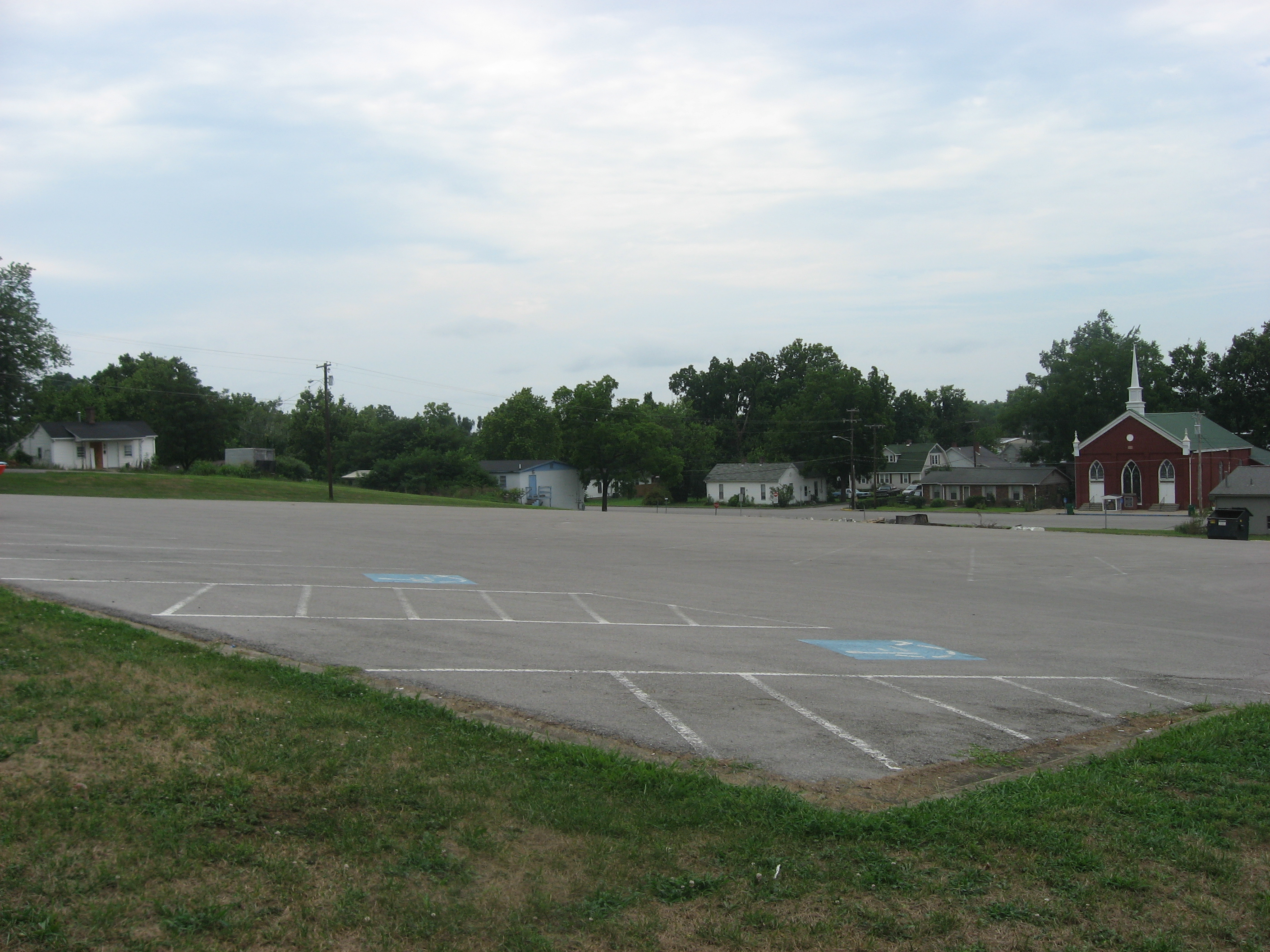
Parking lot for the fort, under which the actual fort site lies

== History ==
=== 1773–1774 ===
The history of Old Fort Harrod can be traced back to the year 1773, where it is said that Captain James Harrod felled the first tree that signaled the beginning of human habitation in the Kentucky territory. The fort itself was built in June 1774 by James Harrod, Abraham Hite, Jacob and James Sandusky, and thirty other men including General James Ray and Captain William Pogue. For the construction of the fort and Harrodsburg itself, one half-acre lot was laid out within the fort walls, and five acres of land were plotted outside the walls, one for each member of Harrod's crew. After the cabins were erected for each plot, they were distributed to each man in a lottery system.

=== 1780s–1790s ===
In 1780, after the establishment of Harrodsburg, the Kentucky territory had been separated into three counties: Fayette, Jefferson, and Lincoln; Harrodsburg was then a part of Lincoln County. In 1785, the counties were further divided and Harrodsburg was made a part of Mercer County, in which it remains today. Multiple county court meetings were held in the Harrodsburg courthouse between September 22, 1789, and April 27, 1790. Some of the most notable members of the court justices were Samuel McAfee and Samuel McDowell.

== Layout ==
The layout of the buildings within the fort remain the same, however, some of the landmarks, such as the springs are in different locations due to the forts relocation.

Fort Harrod itself spans an area of 264 square feet. The walls of the fort are composed of pickets measuring 14 feet tall and more than a foot in diameter; they are buried 4 feet in the ground, making the wall stand at about 10 feet tall all around. Gates are located on the North and West walls, spanning 10 feet wide.

Inside the fort walls, there are blockhouses sitting at the Southwest and Southeast corners, where the upper stories extend 2 feet beyond the walls; they were built this way to allow for gunfire along the walls, where other gunmen may not have been able to reach from the stockades. Between these blockhouses sit seven story-and-a-half tall houses, measuring 20 feet by 20 feet, with 10 feet of space between them. A single story tall cabin was built next to the east corner, which was used as a school. Two springs were located within the fort, one at the Northwest corner and one on the eastern side. Currently, the spring near the Northeast wall is the only one within the fort walls. A blacksmith shop is located on the southern wall of the fort.
