= David Winfield Huddleston =

Evangelical minister and author (born 1943)

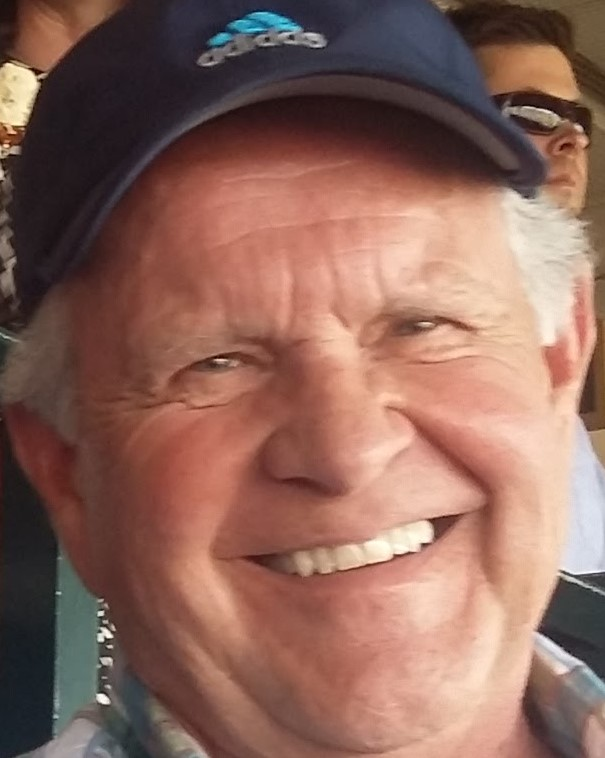

David Huddleston is an evangelical minister and Christian author. He was born in Harrodsburg, Kentucky on October 15, 1943. He has preached and ministered in more than 100 places in North America, Europe, and the Caribbean and is the author of Life's Spiritual Instruction Book, Spiritual Jetstreams and Holy Spirit, My Helper.

Huddleston is an alumnus of the University of Kentucky and Asbury Theological Seminary. He holds Master of Divinity and Doctor of Theology degrees and is a former pilot with Eastern Air Lines where he flew extensively throughout Latin America and the Caribbean while based in Miami, Florida.

== Early years ==
The third oldest of four children of James Irvin Huddleston Sr. and Lucile Gabhart Huddleston, David Huddleston grew up in Harrodsburg, Kentucky.

== Family ==
David and his wife of 53 years, Edie Huddleston, have two children and five grandchildreen.

== Bibliography ==
- Life's Spiritual Instruction Book (1994)
- Spiritual Jetstreams (2003)
- "Heart Talk", monthly Christian advice column in The Christian Voice (2000–2001).
- Holy Spirit, My Helper (2025)
