= Mentelle Park =

- U.S. National Register of Historic Places
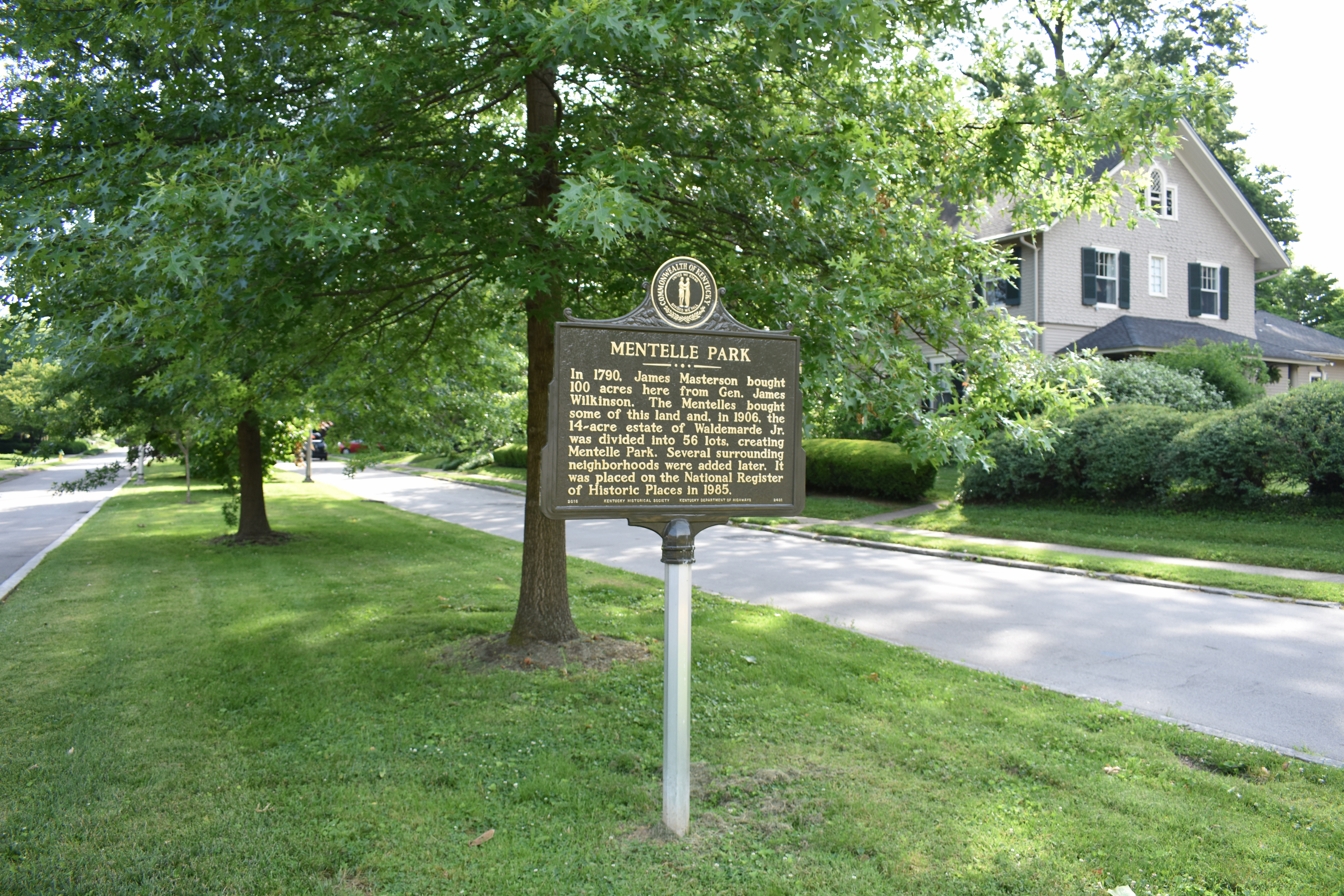
- Mentelle Park in 2019

- Location within Kentucky Location within the United States
- Location: Mentelle Pk., Lexington, Kentucky
- Coordinates: 38°02′06″N 84°28′48″W
- Area: 12 acres (4.9 ha)
- Architect: Multiple
- Architectural style: Colonial Revival, Bungalow/craftsman, American Foursquare
- NRHP reference No.: 85002973
- Added to NRHP: November 27, 1985

Mentelle Park in Lexington, Kentucky, is a boulevard district of the Mentelle neighborhood. The district includes 48 residential structures facing Mentelle Park between Richmond Road and Cramer Avenue. Entrances to Mentelle Park at Richmond Road and Cramer Avenue feature limestone pillars. The neighborhood was developed in 1905, and homes in the district were constructed 1906–1934. Four styles of architecture are evident, including American Foursquare, Colonial Revival, Colonial Revival Cottage, and Bungalow. Foursquare and Colonial houses are two stories, and Bungalows and cottages are 1 1/2 stories. The district was added to the National Register of Historic Places in 1985.

Mentelle Park is named for the Mentelle family, and developers purchased 14 acres from heirs of Rose Mentelle in 1905 and formed the Mentelle Company. Lexington mayor Thomas A. Combs was president of the company. The land was purchased by Waldemarde Mentelle Jr., in 1854 and deeded to his sister, Rose Mentelle, upon his death in 1886. The company developed 56 home sites along an extended block with a segmented median, and the 48 contributing resources in the district are part of the original development.

== See also ==
- Edme Mentelle, father of Waldemarde Mentelle Sr.
- Mary Todd Lincoln, Madame Mentelle's finishing school graduate
