= Mercer County Schools (Kentucky) =

School district in Kentucky, USA

Mercer County Schools is a school district serving Mercer County, Kentucky, headquartered in Harrodsburg.

Prior to 2006 Harrodsburg Independent Schools superintendent Dr. H.N. Snodgrass proposed a merger to the Mercer county school authorities because of the declining enrollment in his district; they were initially hesitant but later agreed. The Harrodsburg school system merged into the Mercer County Schools in 2006.

== Schools ==
- Mercer County Senior High School
- King Middle School
- Mercer County Intermediate School
- Mercer Elementary School
