= Harrodsburg Independent Schools =

Defunct school district in Kentucky

Harrodsburg Independent Schools was a school district headquartered in Harrodsburg, Kentucky.

It operated Evan Harlow Elementary School, Harrodsburg Middle School, and Harrodsburg High School, as well as the Harrodsburg Day Treatment Program.

Around 2006 the district had about 900 students. There were fewer students because newer housing was built in the boundaries of the Mercer County Schools instead of the independent school district. Harrodsburg superintendent Dr. H.N. Snodgrass proposed a merger to the Mercer county school authorities; they were initially hesitant but later agreed. The Harrodsburg school system merged into the Mercer County Schools in 2006. Its territory is now within the Mercer County School District.
