= James Harrod =

American pioneer

- Born: 1746; Bedford County, Pennsylvania
- Disappeared: February 1792 (aged 46); Kentucky
- Died: 1798 (aged 52)
- Occupation: pioneer
- Known for: Built the first permanent settlement in Kentucky
- Title: colonel
- Spouse: Ann Coburn McDonald
- Children: Margaret Harrod
- Parent(s): John Harrod and Sarah Moore

James Harrod (c. 1746 – c. 1798) was a pioneer, soldier, and hunter who helped explore and settle the area west of the Allegheny Mountains. Little is known about Harrod's early life, including the exact date of his birth. He was possibly underage when he served in the French and Indian War, and later participated in Lord Dunmore's War. He also rose to the rank of colonel in the local militia.

A contemporary of better known explorers, like Daniel Boone, George Rogers Clark, Benjamin Logan, and Simon Kenton, Harrod led many expeditions into the regions that are now a part of Kentucky and Illinois. He and a band of almost forty men founded the first permanent settlement in Kentucky on June 16, 1774, although it had to be abandoned the same year. Restored in 1775, the community was known as Harrodstown and then Harrodsburg in his honor.

In 1792, Harrod disappeared while on a hunting trip in the wilderness. While it is possible that he was killed by Indians or became ill and died of natural causes, some have suggested that he took a "wilderness divorce" from his wife, while his family maintained that he was murdered by one of his companions while secretly searching for the fabled silver mine of Jonathan Swift.

== Early life ==
James Harrod was born in Bedford County, Province of Pennsylvania, a British Royal Colony, now Bedford County, Pennsylvania, as one of twelve children born to John and Sarah Moore Harrod. His actual year of birth is disputed. When he volunteered as one of "Captain Cochran's Recruits" in June 1760, he listed his age at sixteen, but historian James C. Klotter notes that his listed height of 5 feet, 2 inches differed greatly from his adult height of over six feet and may suggest that he lied about his age in order to serve. Various sources list his birth year anywhere from 1742 to 1746, and the latter is most often considered correct.

He grew up a frontiersman, and became particularly adept at hunting, trapping, and fishing. His skill with a rifle was particularly noteworthy. His brother Sam and his father's first wife were both killed by Indians. In 1754, near the outset of the French and Indian War, Harrod's father died. The family relocated to Fort Littleton, where Harrod served as a ranger and a guard. James Harrod and his brother William served under John Forbes during the French and Indian War.

Despite his early experiences with the Indians, Harrod never developed a hatred of them. In fact, he developed a reputation of generosity, often using his hunting skills to provide food for those less skilled than himself. Early sources record that Harrod was illiterate, but Klotter points out that he is known to have kept written records and possessed books in his house.

In 1763, Harrod joined Henry Bouquet in his relief of Fort Pitt during Pontiac's Rebellion. Later, he ventured into the area now known as Illinois. While there, he lived among French traders and learned to speak their language. He also spent some time with the Indians in the area, and learned to speak their languages as well. From there he traveled into the areas that form present-day Kentucky and Tennessee. It was during these later expeditions that he first met Daniel Boone.

== Exploration of Kentucky ==
In 1774, Harrod was ordered by Lord Dunmore to lead an expedition to survey the bounds of land promised by the British crown to soldiers who served in the French and Indian War. Leaving from Fort Redstone, Harrod and 37 men traveled down the Monongahela and Ohio Rivers to the mouth of the Kentucky River, eventually crossing Salt River into what is today Mercer County, Kentucky. On June 16, 1774, the men established the first pioneer settlement in Kentucky, Harrod's Town. The men divided the land amongst them; Harrod chose an area about six miles (10 km) from the settlement proper, which he named Boiling Springs.

Just as Harrod's men had completed the settlement's first structures, Dunmore dispatched Daniel Boone to call them back from the frontier and into military service against the Indians in Lord Dunmore's War. Harrod enlisted in the militia, but arrived too late to participate in the war's only major battle – the Battle of Point Pleasant. His men arrived at the battle site at midnight on October 10, the day the fighting ended.

On March 8, 1775, Harrod led a group of settlers back to Harrodstown to stay. Within months, the town grew, and the original fortifications became inadequate. New structures were built on top of Old Fort Hill, which today is the site of Old Fort Harrod State Park. The settlers at Harrodstown joined other pioneers in the area at Boonesborough to formulate the first regulations to govern the area.

In 1778, Harrod married Ann Coburn McDonald at Logan's Station, a settlement established by fellow explorer Benjamin Logan. McDonald had come to Harrodstown in 1776; her first husband was killed by Indians later that year. Her father was also killed and scalped by Indians. The couple had one daughter, Margaret, who was born in September 1785. McDonald also had a son from her previous marriage, James, who was captured by Indians in November 1787 and burned at the stake.

Harrod successfully opposed Richard Henderson's colonization schemes for the area. Well respected in the settlement, he held several positions of political leadership. When Virginia created Kentucky County on December 31, 1776, Harrodstown was designated the county seat. In 1777, Harrod became a justice in Kentucky County, and was elected to the Virginia House of Delegates in 1779. Throughout the 1780s, he served as a trustee for the settlement that bore his name. In 1784, he attended the first of a series of meetings in Danville that eventually led to Kentucky's petition for statehood.

Harrod's political service was frequently interrupted by military necessity. In 1776 and 1777, he led two expeditions eastward to secure provisions for the fledgling forts of Kentucky. Harrod again served in the militia, and defended the settlement of Harrodstown from Indian attacks throughout the summer of 1777. Beginning as a captain, he attained the rank of colonel by 1779.

== Disappearance ==
As the settlement of Harrodstown grew, James Harrod became a wealthy farmer, owning more than 20,000 acres (80 km^{2}) across Kentucky. He also became increasingly socially detached and went to make long, solitary excursions into the wilderness. In February 1792, he and two other men entered the wilderness of Kentucky to hunt for beaver. Harrod never returned from the expedition.

=== Abandonment theory ===
Many theories have been proposed as to the fate of James Harrod. That he was killed by Indians or fell ill and died in the wilderness are among the common explanations. Several other theories hinge on the idea that Harrod abandoned his family and went to another part of the country. A legal deposition from Harrod's sister claims that Harrod came to live with her following his disappearance in Kentucky. Another tradition holds that Harrod had been married in Pennsylvania before his pioneer days, and that he simply returned to his first family. A third tradition holds that two pioneers from Kentucky who were being held captive by Indians near Detroit, Michigan saw a man enter the Indian camp. They claimed to recognize him, and addressed him as "Colonel Harrod." Upon returning to Kentucky, the pair indicated that Harrod had intended to return to his family, but had not said when. Ann Harrod offered the men one thousand dollars to take her to Harrod's location, but the men declined, stating that the trip was too dangerous.

In an interview with a historian half a century after Harrod's disappearance, a man named Henry Wilson claimed that Harrod had told him that he felt like his wife Ann had become too intimate with some of the other men in the town. Another man corroborated that Ann was not always a loving wife. Wilson claimed that Harrod told him "You will not see me here again," and that years later, someone had claimed to have seen Harrod in the northern United States.

Some historians doubt Wilson's account, since other things that he told the historian proved false. Also, in the will he made out just prior to his disappearance, he left everything to his "beloved wife" and daughter. Other settlers declared that Harrod "almost worshiped" his wife. Ann was granted an annulment of her third marriage in April 1804 on the grounds that her previous husband was still living. It is not clear whether Ann had contact with Harrod following his disappearance or if she was simply seeking a means of escaping an undesirable marriage.

=== Murder theory ===
Harrod's wife, daughter, and son-in-law believed that Harrod had been killed by one of his fellow hunters, a man named Bridges. The family claimed that Harrod and his companions had not been hunting beaver, but were instead searching for a silver mine that a man named Jonathan Swift had claimed to have discovered years before. Ann Harrod claimed that she had warned her husband that she feared that Bridges was planning to murder him because of a dispute over some property that the two had some years earlier. Although Harrod had said he was not afraid, he made out the will. He also allowed a fellow explorer and friend, Michael Stoner, to accompany him on the trip.

According to Stoner's account, the group had camped on the Three Forks of the Kentucky River (Beattyville, Kentucky) near an area where Harrod had found an abundance of beaver. One morning, Stoner was making breakfast while Harrod and Bridges checked their traps. Suddenly, Bridges rushed back to the camp, claiming that he heard a shot from Harrod's vicinity. When Harrod did not return, Bridges offered to look for him. He soon returned and claimed that he had seen fresh signs of Indian activity in the woods, and was sure Harrod must have been killed. Stoner wanted to look for Harrod, but Bridges insisted that it was too dangerous. Eventually, Stoner acquiesced. Soon after the expedition, Bridges went to Lexington where he sold some furs and some silver buttons engraved with the letter "H" at a local shop. The shopkeeper sent the buttons to Ann Harrod, who said they belonged to her husband.

Later, while searching the area where Harrod was last seen, some of Harrod's friends found some bones in a cave. The bones were still tightly wrapped in sedge grass, which appeared to have been used to help transport the body to its present location. Some of the friends claimed that the bones were wearing Harrod's shirt, and that the buttons were missing. Others claimed there was no shirt at all. Regardless, when the men returned, Bridges had fled the area. Harrod's family claimed that Bridges' flight proved that Harrod's friends had found Harrod's body in the cave and feared that he would be implicated in his death. However, when Ann applied for Harrod's pension, she swore he had died in a hunting accident and that his clothes had been found in a nearby river.

== See also ==
- List of people who disappeared mysteriously (pre-1910)
