= Kentucky County, Virginia =

Former county in Virginia, United States

Coordinates: 37°37′N 83°27′W

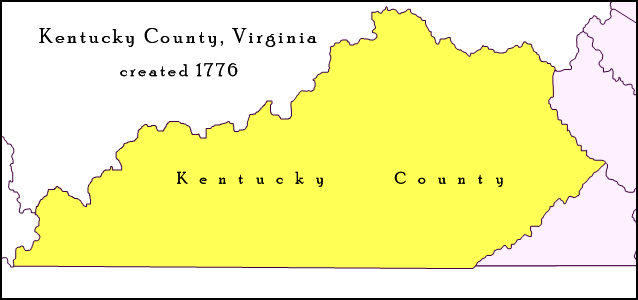
Kentucky County, 1776–1780, as established by the Virginia General Assembly.

Kentucky County, also known as Kentucke County and the District of Kentucky, was the westernmost county in the Commonwealth of Virginia from 1776 until it was admitted to the Union as the 15th state in 1792.

The name of the county was taken from a Native American place name that came to be associated with a river in east central Kentucky, and gave the Kentucky River its name and eventually the U.S. state of Kentucky. During the almost four years of Kentucky County's existence, its seat of government was Harrodstown (then also known as Oldtown, later renamed Harrodsburg).

The entire existence of Kentucky County was in the context of the Western theater of the American Revolutionary War. Except for the old French settlements in Illinois country, Kentucky was the western theater, and several major battles of the War occurred during its existence including the siege of Boonesborough, siege of Logan's Fort, and Bird's invasion of Kentucky. Other events include the invalidation of Transylvania Colony and the survey of Walker's Line, Kentucky's southern boundary. The Cherokee-American wars were initiated in Kentucky in 1776 by disgruntled Cherokee. General George Rogers Clark conducted his infamous Illinois Campaign from his base at the Falls of the Ohio in 1778–79. During its 4 years, the population of Kentucky County rose from about 300 to a little less than 1000 in 1780.

In the Land Act of May 3, 1779, the Virginia General Assembly allocated the Military District in Kentucky County. What had been necessity became policy: Virginian Revolutionary War veterans as well as veterans from the French and Indian War and Lord Dunmore's War, would receive land grants in lieu of pay for their service in either the Virginia militia or the Continental Army. The District was defined to lie between the Green River and the Carolina line stretching from the Tennessee and Ohio Rivers in the west and tapering to a point near the Cumberland Gap in the southeast. Most of it except a wedge adjacent to the Cumberland Mountains, lies in the geographic region of the Pennyroyal, and occupied over 35% of the land area of Kentucky County. Legitimate claims held under the Transylvania colony were excluded from allocation, as well as the grant to Richard Henderson along the Green River. The District remained a separate area when Kentucky County was divided into subsidiary counties in 1780. Later, in 1784, Virginia allocated another district north of the Ohio River, because it was afraid that the Kentucky district was inadequate. Claims resulted in a warrant for a specified number of acres depending on the soldier's rank and length of service. A claim was validated by building a cabin and planting corn. A survey establishing the bounds would be made, and a patent thereafter issued. In December 1795, an act of the Kentucky Legislature required military claims to be presented before January 1796 or become void (although the Act was amended several times to grant extensions). Thereafter, unclaimed areas of the Military District were open to general settlement.

Kentucky County was abolished effective November 1, 1780, when it was divided into Fayette, Jefferson, and Lincoln counties. Afterward, these counties and those set off from them later in that decade were designated collectively as the District of Kentucky by the Virginia House of Delegates. On March 7, 1789, the Virginia General Assembly officially changed the spelling of Kentucke to Kentucky. The counties of the district frequently petitioned both the Virginia legislature and the Continental Congress seeking statehood. Finally successful, the Commonwealth of Kentucky was admitted to the United States as the 15th state in 1792. Harrodsburg, which had become the seat of government for Lincoln County and then Mercer County, was the seat of the federal court for the district until the legislature of the new state designated Frankfort as its capital in 1792.

Militia officers

The county militia was organized as follows:

- John Bowman – Colonel – County Lieutenant of Kentucky County, Virginia 12/1776 & 11/1779
- George Rogers Clark – Major
- Anthony Bledsoe – Major
- John Todd – Captain – Virginia
- Benjamin Logan – Captain – Kentucky County, Virginia
- Daniel Boone – Captain – Boonesborough, Kentucky
- James Harrod – Captain – Harrodsburg, Kentucky

== See also ==
- Illinois County, Virginia
- History of Kentucky
- List of former counties, cities, and towns of Virginia
- Trans-Appalachia
- Wilderness Road
- Overmountain Men
- Tennessee County, North Carolina
