= John Todd (Virginia soldier) =

American politician

- Born: March 27, 1750; Montgomery County, Pennsylvania Colony
- Died: August 19, 1782 (aged 32) near Robertson County, Kentucky, United States
- Cause of death: Killed in action
- Occupations: Politician, military officer
- Known for: Early pioneer and statesman of Kentucky; co-founder of Lexington, Kentucky
- Spouse: Jane Hawkins (m. 1780–1782)
- Children: Mary Owen Todd born 1781
- Parents: David Todd (father); Hannah Owen (mother)
- Relatives: Robert Todd (brother); Levi Todd (brother); Robert Smith Todd (nephew); Mary Todd Lincoln (great-niece)

John Todd (March 27, 1750 – August 19, 1782) was an American military officer and politician who fought during the Revolutionary War and became the first administrator of the Illinois County of the U.S. state of Virginia before that state ceded the territory to the federal government.

== Early life ==
Todd was born in Montgomery County, Pennsylvania, the son of David Todd and the brother of Robert and Levi Todd, the latter being grandfather of Mary Todd Lincoln. He was educated in Virginia at a school run by his uncle, the Rev. John Todd. After obtaining a license to practice law, Todd settled in Fincastle, Virginia. He and his two brothers all owned slaves.

== Career ==
In 1774, Todd served in the Battle of Point Pleasant, which was fought near present-day Point Pleasant, West Virginia and is celebrated in West Virginia as the first battle in the American Revolutionary War. He was then drawn west into the recently opened frontier of Kentucky where he purchased land near Lexington.

Todd served in the Virginia legislature in 1776 and then participated in the expedition led by George Rogers Clark against Kaskaskia and Vincennes that captured the Illinois Country from the British in 1778. With Clark as commandant of the entire territory north and west of the Ohio river, Todd was appointed as County Lieutenant and Civil Commandant of "Illinois County", which had been organized by the Virginia legislature in 1778 with the government based in Kaskaskia.

In 1780, Todd returned to Richmond, Virginia, as a delegate from the Kentucky County to the Virginia Legislature, where he married Jane Hawkins. His wife settled on their property in Lexington, while he left to administer affairs in Illinois County. Because of his duties on the frontier, he was seldom home. In 1780, the Virginia Legislature divided the original Kentucky County into three counties: Lincoln, Jefferson, and Fayette. Colonel Todd was placed in charge of Fayette County militia with Daniel Boone as lieutenant colonel.

In 1782, Todd was killed fighting in the Battle of Blue Licks in Robertson County, Kentucky, one of the last battles of the Revolutionary War.

=== Legacy ===
Todd County, Kentucky is named after him.

== Sources ==
- Family of Mary Todd Lincoln see Generation Four.
- Origin of Todd County, Kentucky
- A brief history of St. Clair County, Chapter III of Transition to American Rule by Prof. W. C. Walton
- Allen, William B. (1872). A History of Kentucky: Embracing Gleanings, Reminiscences, Antiquities, Natural Curiosities, Statistics, and Biographical Sketches of Pioneers, Soldiers, Jurists, Lawyers, Statesmen, Divines, Mechanics, Farmers, Merchants, and Other Leading Men, of All Occupations and Pursuits. Bradley & Gilbert. pp. 55–57.
- Colonel John Todd's record Book of 1779
