= Harrodsburg, Kentucky =

- City
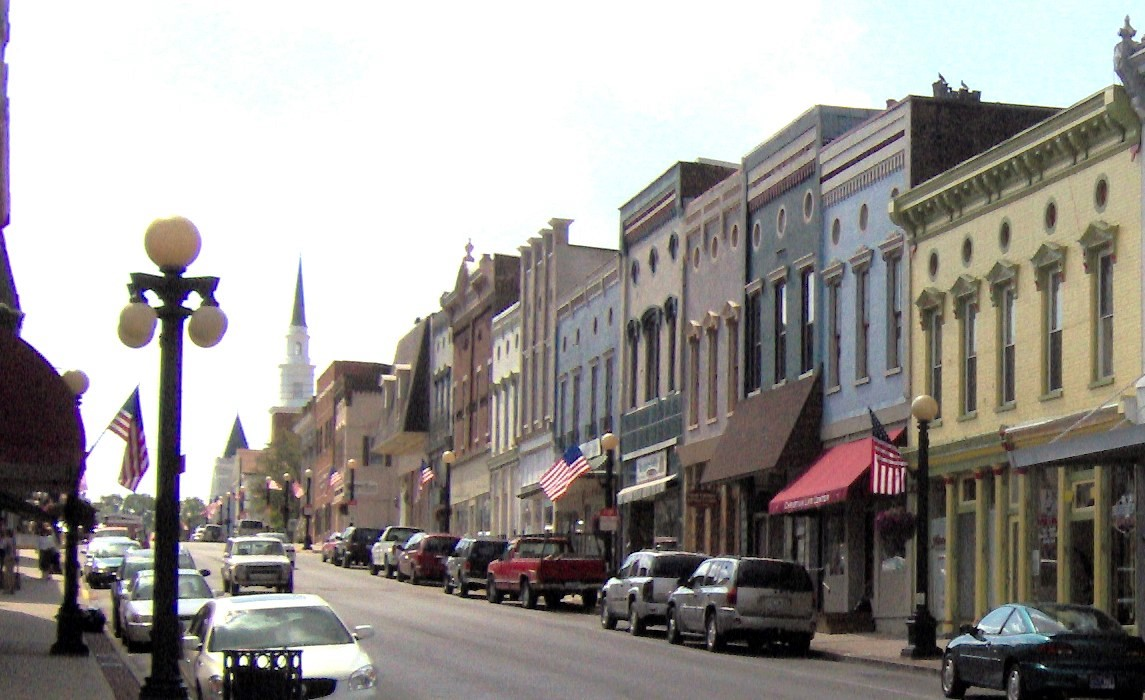
- Downtown Harrodsburg, 2007

- Location of Harrodsburg in Mercer County, Kentucky.

- Location Harrodsburg (the United States)
- Coordinates: 37°45′56″N 84°50′51″W
- Country: United States
- State: Kentucky
- County: Mercer
- Founded: June 16, 1774
- Incorporated: March 1, 1836
- Named after: James Harrod

Government
  - Mayor: Bob Williams

Area
  - Total: 6.94 sq mi (17.98 km^{2})
  - Land: 6.92 sq mi (17.93 km^{2})
  - Water: 0.019 sq mi (0.05 km^{2})
- Elevation: 837 ft (255 m)

Population (2020)
  - Total: 9,064
  - Estimate (2024): 9,491
  - Density: 1,309.6/sq mi (505.63/km^{2})
- Time zone: UTC-5 (Eastern (EST))
  - Summer (DST): UTC-4 (EDT)
- ZIP code: 40330
- Area code: 859
- FIPS code: 21-34966
- GNIS feature ID: 2403806
- Website: https://www.harrodsburgky.gov/

Harrodsburg is a home rule-class city in and the county seat of Mercer County, Kentucky, United States. The population was 9,064 at the 2020 census.

Although Harrodsburg was formally established by the Virginia House of Burgesses after Boonesborough and was not incorporated by the Kentucky legislature until 1836, President Franklin D. Roosevelt honored it as the oldest permanent American settlement west of the Appalachians.

== History ==
=== 18th century ===
Harrodstown (originally called Harrod's Town) was laid out and founded by James Harrod on June 16, 1774. Harrod led a company of adventurers totaling 31 men, beginning in the spring of 1774 at Fort Redstone in Pennsylvania down the Monongahela and Ohio Rivers in canoes and through a series of other rivers and creeks to the town's present-day location.

Later that same year, amid Dunmore's War, Lord Dunmore sent two men to warn the surveyors of imminent Shawnee attacks, Daniel Boone and Michael Stoner, who are said to have completed the round trip of 800 miles in 61 days. Regardless, the pioneers remained for a few weeks until a man was killed by the natives, when the settlement was abandoned and resettled the following year by March. It was one of three settlements in present-day Kentucky at the time the Thirteen Colonies declared independence in 1776, along with Logan's Fort and Boonesborough. Also known as Oldtown, Harrodstown was the first seat of Virginia's Kentucky (1776), Lincoln (1780), and Mercer (1785) Counties upon their formations. It remains the seat of Mercer County in Kentucky.

A census taken between Dec. 16, 1777, and Oct. 16, 1778, lists 52 residents, several of whom were well-known pioneers and frontiersmen, including Daniel Boone's younger brother, Squire Boone, Silas Harlan, the Kentucky county's namesake, James Harrod, Hugh McGary, Isaac Hite and his cousins, Isaac and John Bowman, and David Glenn, who later travelled further west and settled in Yellow Banks (present Daviess County). David Glenn, along with his brother Thomas, and Silas Harlan, with his brother James, had accompanied Harrod on his initial expedition in 1774.

The settlement was formally established by the Virginia General Assembly in 1785 as Harrodsburg. Four years later, it was named the location for the newly created United States District Court for the District of Kentucky by the Judiciary Act of 1789.

=== 19th century ===
The Kentucky General Assembly incorporated Harrodsburg in 1836.

During the Civil War, the town was generally pro-Confederate, however Union control permitted the organization two Union regiments, the 19th Regiment Kentucky Volunteer Infantry and the 11th Regiment Kentucky Volunteer Cavalry. The 19th Infantry as organized at nearby Camp Harwood for a three-year enlistment commencing January 2, 1862, under the command of Colonel William J. Landram. Companies A, C, D, and F of the 11th Kentucky Cavalry were organized at Harrodsburg, Kentucky, in July 1862. The remainder of the regiment was organized in Louisville, Kentucky, and mustered in on September 26, 1862, for three years service under the command of Colonel Alexander W. Holeman. Following the Battle of Perryville, much of the city was converted into makeshift hospitals; 1600 sick and wounded Confederate soldiers were captured during a raid by the 9th Kentucky Cavalry under Lieutenant Colonel John Boyle on October 10, 1862. The city then remained under martial law for the remainder of the war.

The Louisville Southern Railroad network reached the city in 1888. Its construction commenced in 1884 and ran from Louisville through Shelbyville and Lawrenceburg to Harrodsburg, which was reached in 1888. A spur was constructed to Burgin, where the Louisville Southern joined the Cincinnati Southern's Cincinnati, New Orleans and Texas Pacific Railway CNO&TP mainline. Now all run and are operated by Norfolk Southern Railway.

=== 20th century ===
Pioneer Memorial Park (now Old Fort Harrod State Park) was opened on June 16, 1927. In 1936, President Franklin Delano Roosevelt honored the city with a monument honoring the "first permanent settlement west of the Appalachians".

Company D of the 192nd Tank Battalion in the Battle of Bataan was from Harrodsburg.

== Geography ==
According to the United States Census Bureau, the city has a total area of 6.9 sq mi (17.9 km^{2}), all land.

== Transportation ==
U.S. 127 runs north–south through Harrodsburg. U.S. 127 Bypass goes around Harrodsburg. U.S. 68 runs east–west through the city, but U.S. 68 turns onto U.S. 127 some of the time in Harrodsburg. KY 152 also runs east–west through the area.

== Economy ==
- Hitachi Astemo has its Registered Head Office in Harrodsburg.
- Corning Incorporated has a plant located in Harrodsburg that makes Gorilla Glass.

=== Corning / Apple Collaboration ===
In August 2025, Apple announced a $2.5 billion investment with Corning to increase production for cover glass to supply 100 percent of worldwide manufacturing needs for all iPhones and Apple Watches. Corning is now officially dedicating the entire Harrodsburg facility solely to Apple manufacturing, as well plans for increasing Corning's manufacturing and engineering workforce by 50 percent.

== Climate ==
Harrodsburg is in the humid subtropical climate zone, although verging on a humid continental climate. Summers are hot and humid, and winters are cool with mild periods.

Average high is 87 °F in July and August, the warmest months, with the average lows of 26 °F in January, the coolest month. The highest recorded temperature was 105 °F in September 1954. The lowest recorded temperature was −18 °F in January 1985. Average annual precipitation is 45.73 inches (1,162 mm), with the wettest month being May, averaging 4.68 inches (119 mm).

Climate data for Harrodsburg, Kentucky
Month	Jan	Feb	Mar	Apr	May	Jun	Jul	Aug	Sep	Oct	Nov	Dec	Year
Mean daily maximum °F	41	46	56	66	74	82	86	85	79	68	56	44	65
Mean daily minimum °F	24	27	34	44	54	63	67	65	57	46	36	28	45
Average precipitation inches	3.36	3.52	4.28	3.81	4.68	4.29	4.56	3.85	3.09	2.95	3.45	3.89	45.73
Mean daily maximum °C	5	8	13	19	23	28	30	29	26	20	13	7	18
Mean daily minimum °C	−4	−3	1	7	12	17	19	18	14	8	2	−2	7
Average precipitation mm	85	89	109	97	119	109	116	98	78	75	88	99	1,162
Source: The Weather Channel

== Demographics ==
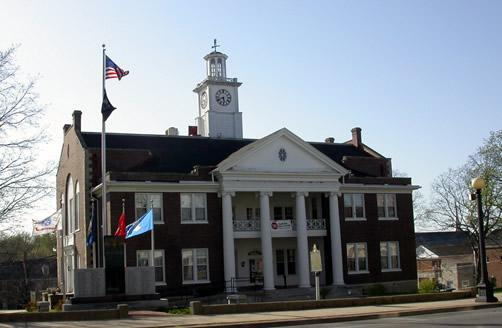
Mercer County Courthouse, 2006

Historical population
Census	Pop.	Note	%±
1800	122		—
1810	313		156.6%
1830	1,051		—
1840	1,254		19.3%
1850	1,481		18.1%
1860	1,668		12.6%
1870	2,205		32.2%
1880	2,202		−0.1%
1890	3,230		46.7%
1900	2,876		−11.0%
1910	3,147		9.4%
1920	3,765		19.6%
1930	4,029		7.0%
1940	4,673		16.0%
1950	5,262		12.6%
1960	6,061		15.2%
1970	6,741		11.2%
1980	7,265		7.8%
1990	7,335		1.0%
2000	8,014		9.3%
2010	8,340		4.1%
2020	9,064		8.7%
2024 (est.)	9,491		4.7%
U.S. Decennial Census 2020

=== 2020 census ===
As of the 2020 census, Harrodsburg had a population of 9,064. The median age was 38.8 years. 24.1% of residents were under the age of 18 and 18.1% of residents were 65 years of age or older. For every 100 females there were 88.9 males, and for every 100 females age 18 and over there were 84.4 males age 18 and over.

99.2% of residents lived in urban areas, while 0.8% lived in rural areas.

There were 3,796 households in Harrodsburg, of which 32.3% had children under the age of 18 living in them. Of all households, 38.4% were married-couple households, 18.1% were households with a male householder and no spouse or partner present, and 33.9% were households with a female householder and no spouse or partner present. About 33.1% of all households were made up of individuals and 15.3% had someone living alone who was 65 years of age or older.

The population density was 1,309.6/sq mi (505.6/km^{2}). There were 4,128 housing units, of which 8.0% were vacant. The homeowner vacancy rate was 2.7% and the rental vacancy rate was 5.4%.

Racial composition as of the 2020 census
Race	Number	Percent
White	7,604	83.9%
Black or African American	582	6.4%
American Indian and Alaska Native	29	0.3%
Asian	48	0.5%
Native Hawaiian and Other Pacific Islander	6	0.1%
Some other race	238	2.6%
Two or more races	557	6.1%
Hispanic or Latino (of any race)	446	4.9%

=== Demographic estimates ===
In 2021, the city's age distribution was 20.6% under 18, 9.2% from 18 to 24, 7.7% from 25 to 29, and 25.9% who were 60 or older. The median age was 39.5 years. Female persons comprised 48.7 percent of residents in 2020.

=== Households and housing ===
In 2021 ACS estimates, there were 4,088 households; 27.1% had children under 18 living with them, 31.0% were married couples living together, 33.1% had a female householder with no spouse present, and 31.4% had a male householder with no spouse present. About 25.7% of all households were made up of individuals, and 6.8% had someone living alone who was 65 or older. The average household size was 2.16, and the average family size was 3.16.

=== Income and poverty ===
The median income for a household in the city was US $41,839 (in 2021). The per capita income for the city was $24,242. About 15.5% of the population was below the poverty line, including 20.8% of those under age 18 and 21.6% of those age 65 or over.

== Education and libraries ==
=== Primary and secondary education ===
Public education is provided by the Mercer County Schools. The Harrodsburg Independent Schools, which operated Harrodsburg High School, merged into the Mercer County Schools in 2006. These schools located are within the Mercer County district:

- Harrodsburg Area Technology Center
- Mercer County Senior High School
- Kenneth D. King Middle School
- Mercer County Intermediate School
- Mercer County Elementary School
- Harlow Early Learning Center

=== Higher education ===
Harrodsburg's Beaumont Inn (1917–present) was known as the Christian Baptist School (1830–1833), Greeneville Institute (1841–1856), Daughters' College (1856–1893), Young Ladies College (1893–1894), Beaumont College (1895–1915), and Daughters' College (1916), prior to becoming Beaumont Inn.

Campbellsville University established a branch campus at the Conover Education Center in 2016.

=== Libraries ===
Harrodsburg has a lending library, the Mercer County Public Library.

== Notable people ==
- Ralph G. Anderson, founder Belcan Corporation, philanthropist
- Jane T. H. Cross (1817–1870), author
- Maria T. Daviess (1814–1896), author; grandmother of Maria Thompson Daviess
- Maria Thompson Daviess (1872–1924), author
- Jason Dunn, National Football League player
- David Winfield Huddleston, Christian author and minister
- Rachel Jackson, wife of President Andrew Jackson
- Frances Wisebart Jacobs, philanthropist
- Dennis Johnson, National Football League player
- William Logan, politician
- Beriah Magoffin, Governor of Kentucky (1859 − 1862) and namesake of Magoffin County, Kentucky
- William Sullivan, politician and lawyer
- John Burton Thompson, politician
- Al Wilson, actor and stunt pilot
- Craig Yeast, National Football League player

== See also ==
- Low Dutch Station
- Rocky Point Manor
