= Killbuck Island =

Former island at the confluence of the Allegheny and Ohio rivers in Pennsylvania

Coordinates: 40.446°N 80.015°W

Killbuck Island, also known historically as Smoky Island or Nelson Island, was a former island in the Ohio River at its confluence with the Allegheny River, near the Point in present-day Pittsburgh, Pennsylvania. The island was associated with the Delaware chief Gelelemend, known to English speakers as John Killbuck Jr., and was the site of the Tradesmen's Industrial Exposition in the late 19th century before disappearing due to flooding and land alteration.

== Geography ==
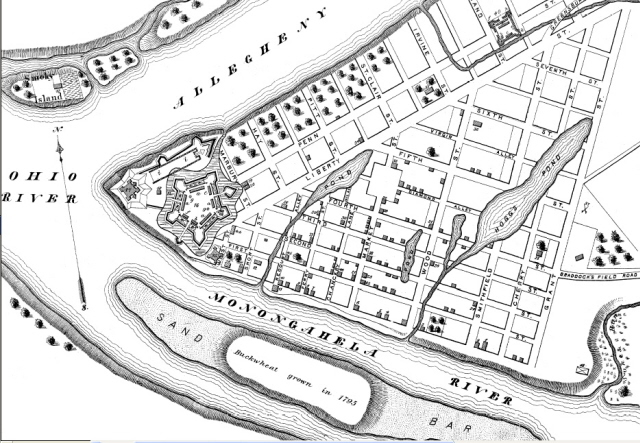
This 1795 street map of Pittsburgh shows an inhabited "Smoky Island," along with some accessory islands.

The island was first recorded on a 1755 map by Gaspard-Joseph Chaussegros de Léry, chief engineer of New France, during his survey of Fort Duquesne and surrounding topography. It lay near the northeastern shore of the confluence of the Allegheny and Ohio rivers.

Early maps and accounts depict one large island with two smaller islets nearby. A 1960s article in the Pittsburgh Post-Gazette stated that the largest was properly called "Smoky Island," while the smaller ones were known as "Killbuck" and "Nelson" islands; in other sources, however, these names appear to have been used interchangeably for the same landmass. Others have suggested that a stream once ran through the center of the island, dividing it into two separate landforms: Smoky or Killbuck Island and Nelson's Island. Still another name that appears in connection with the main island or its islets is Low Island.

In 1786, Hugh Henry Brackenridge described the island in the following terms:

At the distance of about 400 or 500 yards from the head of the Ohio is a small island, lying to the northeast side of the Allegheny river, at a distance of about 70 yards from the shore. It is covered with wood, and at the lowest point is a lofty hill, famous for the number of wild turkeys which inhabit it. The island is not more in length than one-quarter of a mile and in breadth about 100 yards. A small space on the upper end is cleared and overgrown with grass. The savages had cleared it during the late war, a party of them, attached to the United States, having placed their wigwams and raised corn there. The Ohio, at the distance of about one mile from its source, winds round the lower end of the island and disappears.

The main channels of both rivers were on the south side of the island, toward Pittsburgh, while a smaller channel on the north side separated it from the mainland. Historical testimony described the main shore as a "perpendicular bluff" with a narrow path known as Bank Lane (later South Avenue) running along its top. At low water, the channel on the north side narrowed to a slough only a few feet wide, but at higher stages could expand to several dozen feet.

The island's reported size varied: in Killbuck's conveyance to Abner Barker it was described as about 30 acres (12 ha), while an 1851 survey for William Reed gave an area of 43 acres and 127 perches.

== History ==
=== Early history ===
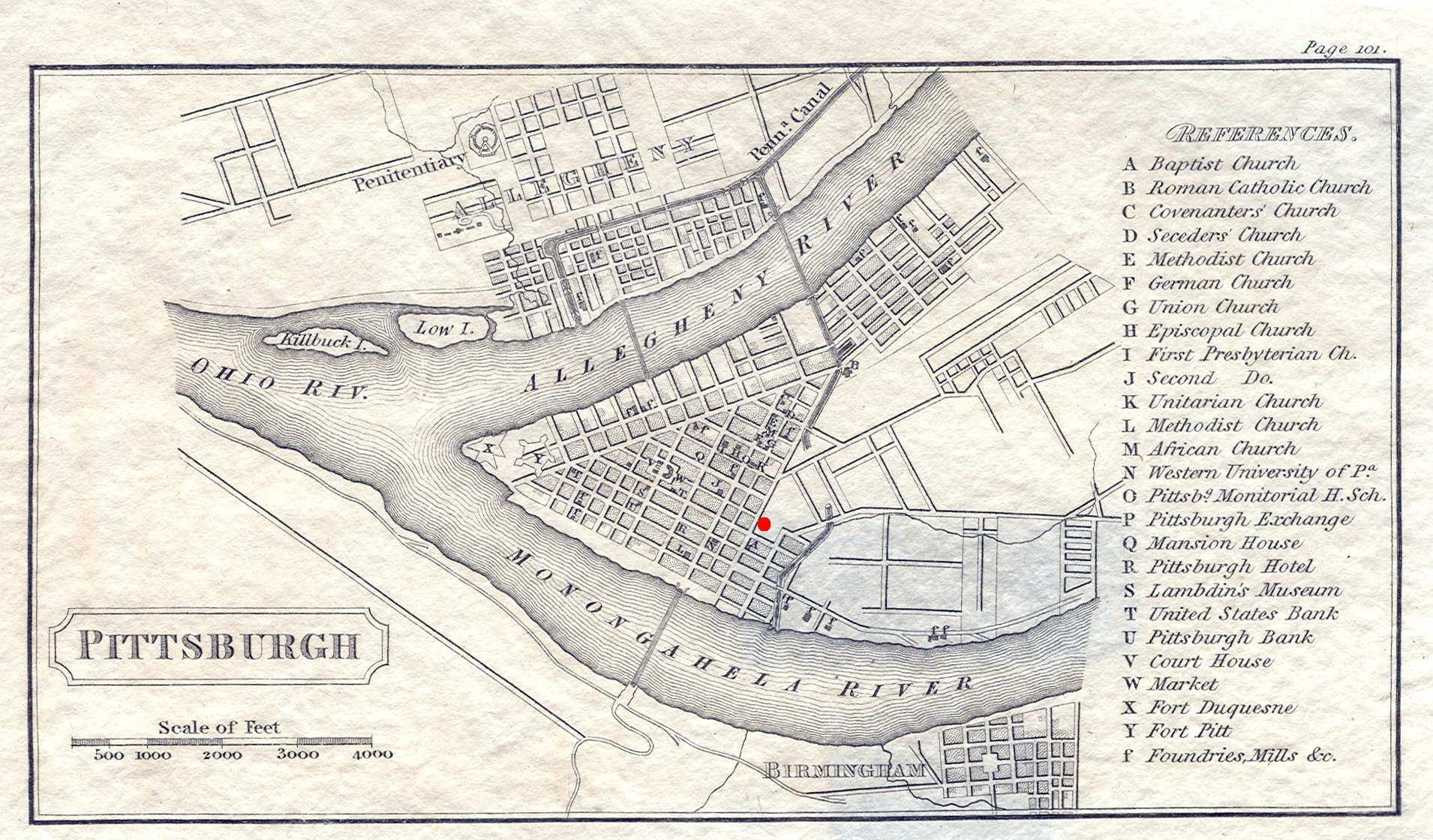
An 1828 map of Pittsburgh depicts both Killbuck I. and Low I.

A tradition recorded by historian Leland Baldwin holds that during the Seven Years' War, following the 1755 defeat of Edward Braddock, Delaware and Shawnee captors used the island to torture and burn English prisoners. Some accounts suggest this episode gave rise to the name "Smoky Island." Other sources ascribe the name less dramatically to "low-lying river mists and the smoke of Indian campfires." Still another source ascribes the name to rubbish fires, from a period when the island served as a dump for the City of Allegheny.

The island later took an alternate name from Gelelemend, or John Killbuck Jr., a leader of the Lenape (Delaware) people who was allied with the United States during the American Revolutionary War. In recognition of his service, the island was given to him by Colonel John Gibson on behalf of the Commonwealth of Pennsylvania.

In 1782, while Killbuck was still living on the island, a group of Scotch-Irish settlers from the Chartiers Creek area marched to attack the friendly Delaware community there. The assault occurred on Sunday morning, March 24; a small guard of regular soldiers from Fort Pitt stationed on the island was surprised and taken prisoner, but Killbuck and several of his warriors escaped to the fort. In the confusion of the attack, Killbuck is said to have lost the only known copy of the so-called "Great Treaty" between William Penn and Tamanend, which had come into his possession through the Turtle Clan leadership.

=== Settlement and occupancy ===
In 1803 Killbuck conveyed the island to Abner Barker for $200. By 1817, David Morgan and his family had settled there, camping at first before building a shanty in 1818. In October 1820 a fire destroyed their home, killing the Morgans' four children.

Zenas Neel acquired title on September 24, 1829, residing there with his family and operating a foundry. A major flood in 1832 washed away most of the topsoil of the island and another flood about a decade later further eroded the land, although apparently a school operated there in 1837.

Some historians have held that the island disappeared altogether during the floods of the 1830s and 40s, while another suggests its disappearance was gradual as sediment filled the channel. One late-19th-century account described how the flood of 1832 swept away both Neel's foundry and much of the island itself, leaving only a small portion at its lower end; subsequent river surges gradually eroded this remnant until nothing remained but a sandbar visible at low water.

Certainly by 1849, observers noted that Smoky Island was increasingly indistinguishable from the mainland, as the channel between them had grown shallow and was navigable only during high water. In the same year, William Reed applied to the Pennsylvania Land Office for a patent to Killbuck Island, but after a survey and legal dispute, the courts ruled the tract was largely "a mere sand-bar, having no land capable of sustaining vegetation," and his claim was denied. Ownership later passed to a group including Andrew Fulton, John E. Parke, and James K. Moorhead. In 1873, the Pennsylvania legislature passed Act No. 941, confirming their title to the property.

=== Tradesmen's Industrial Exposition ===
In November 1874, while litigation was pending, the Tradesmen's Industrial Institute leased the island from the City of Allegheny for fifteen years, rent-free, to hold a permanent exposition of arts, sciences, and industry. Architect Edward M. Butz designed an exhibition hall, and the first exposition opened on October 7, 1875, with premiums valued at $50,000 and displays ranging from inventions to livestock. In 1877, the city's first telephone was demonstrated at the exposition. The exposition was later taken over by the Pittsburgh Exposition Society. On October 2, 1883, however, a fire destroyed the exposition buildings. Newspapers described the destruction as total and the society chose not to rebuild on the site, as its lease was due to expire within a few years.

=== Disappearance ===
Following the fire, the site briefly hosted Exposition Park, home field of the Pittsburgh Alleghenies baseball club, before flooding forced its abandonment in 1884.

Natural flooding and human alteration had for decades progressively filled in the north channel, joining the island to the mainland. For much of the 19th century it was noted that the channel was "incapable of being used at all except in times of high water." By the early 20th century, contractors on Pittsburgh's North Side had dumped excavation fill into the 70-yard (64 m) channel between the mainland and the island. This definitively erased the channel and joined the island's former landmass to the shore.

The filled land eventually became part of a railyard operated by the Pittsburgh and Western Railroad, which in 1923 was labeled in a city plat as the "Smoky Island Yard." In 1932, a long-running ejectment case initiated by the Pittsburgh and Western Railroad against the Equitable Gas Company was resolved in favor of the railroad after eight years of litigation.

The site once occupied by the island is now roughly covered by the Kamin Science Center, Acrisure Stadium, and Stage AE on Pittsburgh's North Shore.
