= Battle of Great Cacapon =

Engagement of the French and Indian War

Coordinates: 39°19′36″N 78°26′01″W

- Part of the French and Indian War
Date	April 18, 1756
Location	near present-day Capon Bridge, Hampshire County, West Virginia
Result	Shawnee-Lenape victory

Belligerents
Shawnee; Lenape	Great Britain

Commanders and leaders
Killbuck	John Mercer †

Strength
Over 100	Approximately 60 Virginia militia

Casualties and losses
Unknown	More than 18 killed All but 6 killed according to Killbuck

The Battle of Great Cacapon — also known as Mercer's Massacre — was fought on April 18, 1756 between members of Colonel George Washington's Virginia Regiment and French-allied Shawnee and Lenape (Delaware) Indians. Captain Mercer and a company of his men were pursuing some Indians when they were ambushed by a larger number of Indian raiders. Mercer and at least 16 of his men were killed.

== Background ==
Following the outbreak of the French and Indian War in 1754, and the failure of British General Edward Braddock's expedition in 1755, French commanders in the Ohio Country encouraged their Indian allies to raid British colonial settlements. Northwestern Virginia (an area including what is now the state of West Virginia) was one area subjected to frequent Indian raids. In an attempt to defend against these raids, Virginia Governor Robert Dinwiddie ordered a series of defensive fortifications to be constructed. These forts were manned by members of Virginia provincial militia under the overall command of Colonel George Washington.

== Battle ==
A Lenape leader named Bemino, known as John Killbuck to the whites, a number of years after the incident, described how he and a band of Indians (probably composed of Lenape and Shawnee) killed two men near Fort Edwards, not far from the Cacapon River in what is now Hampshire County, West Virginia. Deliberately leaving a trail of corn meal, they established an ambush along a high stream bank. Captain John Mercer led a band of militia (said to number from forty to one hundred, depending on sources) in pursuit. When they passed the concealed Indians, the trap was sprung, and the Indians opened a murderous crossfire, killing Mercer and 16 men. More of the militia were chased down and killed, with Killbuck claiming that only six men escaped.

Indians continued to raid in the area throughout the war.
