= Treaty of Fort Pitt =

1778 treaty between the United States and Lenape

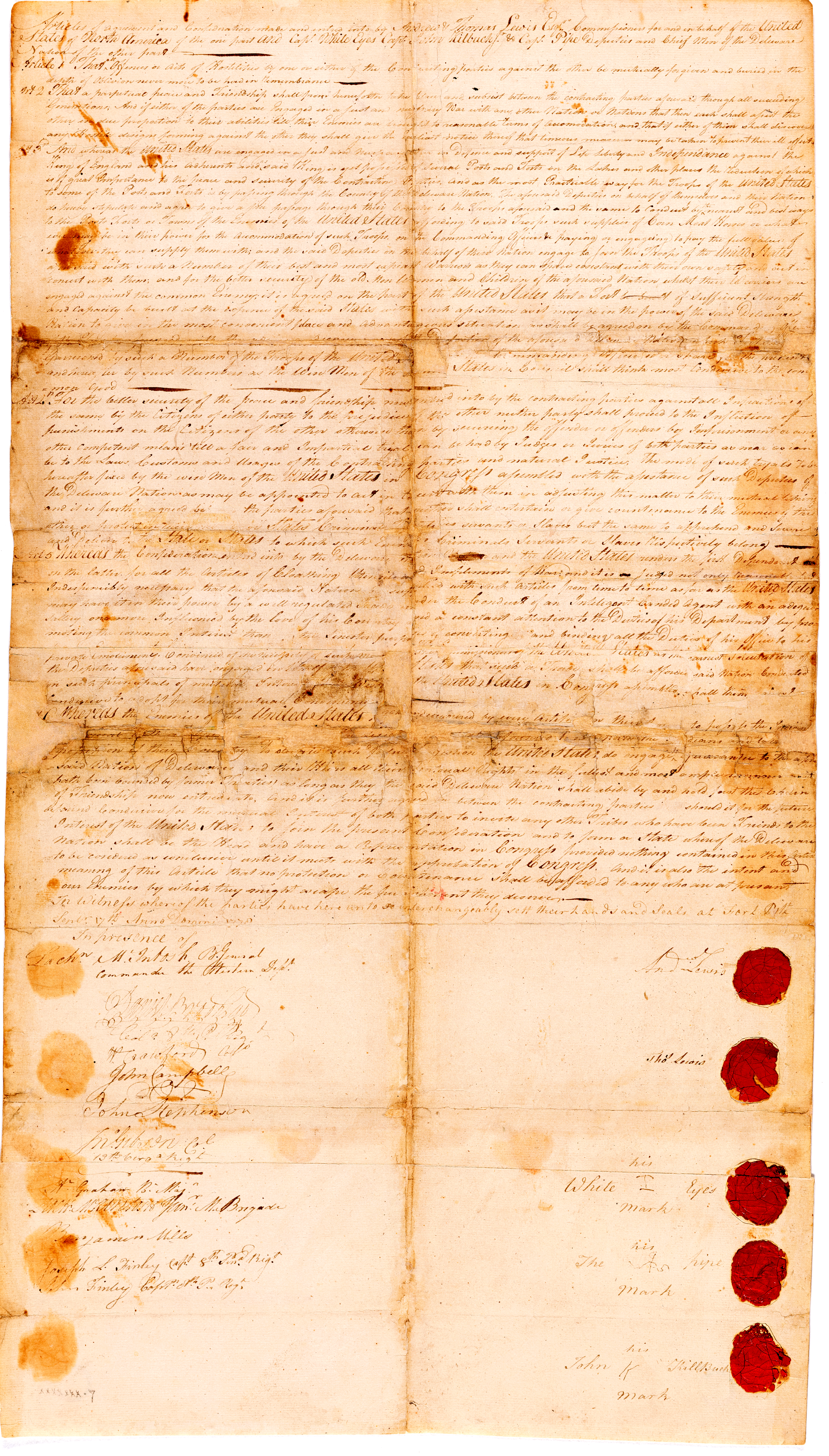
The Treaty of Fort Pitt

The Treaty of Fort Pitt, also known as the Treaty With the Delawares, the Delaware Treaty, or the Fourth Treaty of Pittsburgh, was signed on September 17, 1778; it was the first formal treaty between the new United States of America and any Native American groups, in this case the Lenape, called the Delaware by white settlers. Although there were informal agreements between Native Americans and the Americans during the American Revolutionary War, the first one that resulted in a formal document was signed at Fort Pitt, Pennsylvania, now the site of Downtown Pittsburgh. It was essentially a treaty of military alliance between the Lenape Nation and the United States.

== Background ==
In 1778, the Continental Army started to contemplate an expedition against the British to the west of the Appalachian Mountains, in particular at Detroit. For that end the patriots had to march through the Ohio Valley where Lenape tribes resided. Continental Congress decided to negotiate a formal treaty to secure free passage. It appointed three diplomatic commissioners and appropriated $10,000 (equivalent to $172,564 in 2025) to purchase trade goods for the Lenapes.

== Negotiations ==
The commissioners arrived to Pittsburgh in March 1778. It took time to initiate and pursue negotiations. They were conducted by Koquethaqechton (also White Eyes), Hopocan (also Captain Pipe), and Gelelemend (also John Kill Buck) on the Lenape side, and for the fledgling United States on the other side by Andrew Lewis and Thomas Lewis. After the treaty was finally approved and signed, it was witnessed by Brigadier General Lachlan McIntosh, Colonel Daniel Brodhead, and Colonel William Crawford.

== Treaty ==
The treaty gave the United States permission to travel through the Lenape territory and called Lenape to afford American troops whatever aid they might require in their war against Great Britain, including participation of Lenape warriors. The United States was planning to attack the British fort at Detroit, and Lenape assistance was essential for success.

In exchange, the United States promised "articles of clothing, utensils and implements of war" and to build a fort in Delaware country "for the better security of the old men, women and children... whilst their warriors are engaged against the common enemy." Although not part of the signed treaty, the commissioners pointed out the American alliance with France and intended that the Lenape would become active allies in the war against the British. The possibility of creation of a new Native American state was discussed.

The treaty also recognized the Lenapes as a sovereign nation, guaranteed their territorial rights, and even encouraged the other Ohio Country Indian tribes friendly to the United States to form a state headed by the Lenapes with representation in the Continental Congress. The treaty extended membership to "any other tribes who have been friends to the interest of the United States, to join the present confederation, and to form a state whereof the Delaware nation shall be the head, and have a representation in Congress." The treaty was buried in committee in Congress and never fulfilled. The lead Lenape negotiator White Eyes died in November 1778, and was later believed to have been murdered by a white militiaman.

According to historian Jessica Choppin Roney, the treaty highlights that there was a possibility for an American state that was not purely governed by Anglo-American white settlers:

in the earliest years of nation building, some people in the United States imagined a union that included polities distinct from those of Anglo-America and instead rooted in their own local precedent, history, and culture, making space for diverse communities, including Indigenous polities and Catholic Quebec. This form of union was brief—tragically so—but that it existed at all bears examination. It disrupts a narrative that settler colonialism was an unthinking or inevitable force. U.S. policy makers did not fail to conceive of political union with Indigenous nations; they deliberately rejected it.

== Implementation ==
According to Daniel K. Richter in Facing East from Indian Country, the Lenape perceived the agreement "merely as free passage" of revolutionary troops and the building of a protective fort to defend white settlers. The American leaders intended to use the fort for offensive campaigns and wrote into the treaty that the Lenape would attack their native neighbors.

Within a year, the Lenape were expressing grievances about the treaty. White Eyes, the tribe's most outspoken ally of the United States, allegedly died of smallpox. However, since he already had smallpox in the past, it was believed that he was killed by the American militiamen near Detroit (according to George Morgan). A Lenape delegation visited Philadelphia in 1779 to explain its dissatisfaction to the Continental Congress, but nothing changed, and the peaceful relations between the United States and the Lenape Nation collapsed and the tribe soon joined the British in the war against the American revolutionaries. The Gnadenhutten massacre in 1782 destroyed the remaining goodwill.

== Commemoration ==
The 2013 Sacagawea dollar commemorates the Treaty of Fort Pitt. The coin depicts a turkey, a howling wolf, and a turtle, symbols of the Lenape. Its design was created by Susan Gamble, as part of the Artistic Infusion Program, and engraved by Phebe Hemphill.

== See also ==
- List of Native American treaties
- Timeline of United States diplomatic history
