= Fort Seybert =

18th c. fort in the Allegheny Mountains

Coordinates: 38.695130°N 79.190110°W

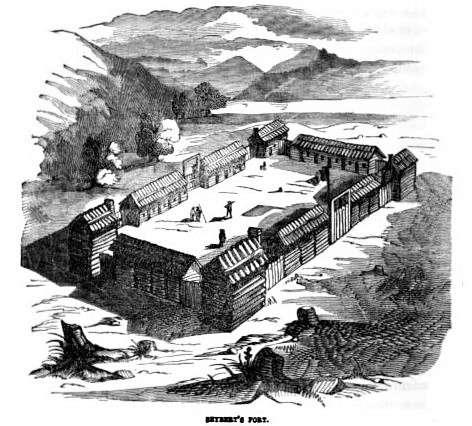
1851 wood engraving of Fort Seybert, published by Wills De Hass

Fort Seybert was an 18th-century frontier fort in the Allegheny Mountains in what is now Pendleton County, West Virginia, United States. In a 1758 surprise raid occasioned by the French and Indian War (1754–63), most of the 30 white settlers sheltering there were massacred by Shawnee and Delaware warriors and the fort was burned. A similar number of settlers at nearby Fort Upper Tract had met the same fate on the previous day. Fort Seybert, of which almost no trace remains today, was situated about 8 miles northeast of the present town of Franklin.

== History ==
=== Background ===
After the defeat of General Edward Braddock at the Battle of the Monongahela (9 July 1755), the white settlers of the Allegheny Mountains were largely unprotected from a series of Shawnee and Delaware Indian raids. By the end of the year, the Virginia Regiment had increased its numbers by several hundred troops and began to temporarily man some of the settler forts that had been hastily thrown up by civilians or soldiers. Fort Seybert was built on the South Fork of the South Branch of the Potomac River within about 100 yards of a pre-existing structure known as John Patton's Mill. Patton had owned the land since 1747, but sold it in 1755 to Jacob Seybert.

Colonel George Washington, the new 24-year-old commander of the Virginia Regiment, embarked on a campaign to protect the settlers of the upper South Branch and surrounding region by building up and manning frontier forts. Among the official records of forts, local militias and Indian raids, Washington and his officers occasionally mention both Fort Upper Tract and Fort Seybert, either by location or name, along with other forts on the South Branch and the South Fork. In August 1756 Washington wrote to Virginia Lieutenant Governor Robert Dinwiddie to say that

...we have built some forts and altered others as far south on the Potomac as settlers have been molested, and there remains one body of inhabitants at a place called Upper Tract who need a guard. Thither I have ordered a party. Beyond this, if I am not misinformed there is nothing but a continued series of mountains uninhabited until we get over to the waters of the James River, not far from the fort which takes its name from your Honor; and thence to May River.

=== Mounting tensions ===
In November, Washington wrote again to Dinwiddie, in an effort to forestall panic among the settlers:

In short, they [the inhabitants] are so affected with approaching ruin that the whole back country is in a general motion toward the other colonies; and I expect that scarce a family will inhabit Frederick, Hampshire or Augusta county in a little time.

The same month Washington reluctantly agreed to a plan for a chain of 23 small forts along the wilderness frontier as proposed by the Virginia Assembly (he preferred fewer, but larger, stronger and better garrisoned, forts). On 1 September 1757 five people were killed and eight captured by Indians on the South Branch. Major Andrew Lewis, who had been ordered to regulate the militia of Augusta County, wrote to Washington of his concerns that the entire South Branch and South Fork region might need to be abandoned owing to lack of garrison troops.

According to a report provided much later to Col. Washington by Capt. Robert Mackenzie, Lieutenant Christopher Gist had marched with six soldiers and 30 Indians, beginning on 2 April 1758, from the South Branch towards Fort Duquesne. Impeded by deep snows on the mountains, they arrived at the Monongahela River, where Gist was seriously injured and incapacitated by a fall from a steep bank. Part of the force stayed with Gist and the remainder, all Indians, divided into three parties and separated. A scout named Ucahala and two others found a large Indian encampment about 15 miles before they came to Ft. Duquesne. They judged it to be at least 100 warriors making directly for the frontier forts region. A little later, Gist and his men came upon the tracks of another large party pursuing the same route. It is likely that the warriors that attacked Forts Upper Tract and Seybert a few days later were among this force.

=== The attack ===
A surprise attack on Fort Seybert occurred on the foggy morning of 28 April 1758 when a number of the men were away, having gone across Shenandoah Mountain on business. There was a shortage of ammunition in the fort and apparently only three adult males on hand, including Captain Seybert, to defend it. Seeing the futile situation that he faced, Seybert surrendered on the basis of promises by the war chief Bemino (known as John Killbuck) that their lives would be spared. Following the surrender, however, the Indians massacred 17 to 19 people; took eleven captive — including Seybert's teenaged son, who returned to the region years later to render an account — and burned the fort. According to Seybert's son:

They bound ten, whom they conveyed without the fort, and then proceeded to massacre the others in the following manner: They seated them in a row upon a log, with an Indian standing behind each; and at a given signal, each Indian sunk his tomahawk into the head of his victim: an additional blow or two dispatched them.

Six days later (4 May), Washington wrote to John Blair, Sr. (then acting Governor of Virginia) from Fort Loudoun (present day Winchester) of the disasters at Forts Upper Tract and Seybert:

The enclosed letter from Capt. Waggener will inform your Honor of a very unfortunate affair. From the best accounts I have yet been able to get there are about 60 persons killed and missing. Immediately upon receiving this Intelligence I sent out a Detachment of the Regiment, and some Indians that were equipped for war in hopes of their being able to intercept the Enemy in the retreat. I was fearful of this stroke, but had not time enough to avert it, as your Honor will find by the following account which came to hand just before Capt. Waggener's letter, by Capt. Mackenzie.

After the raids, Bemino's warriors were said to have left the region by the Indian trail that came to be known (for that reason) as the "Shawnee Trail". Travelling back west, they took their prisoners and loot to the remote Ohio Country.

== Description ==
Traditional descriptions of the fort by those living in the vicinity (the local community is still called "Fort Seybert" to this day) were handed down for generations. One of these, written by Mr. Alonzo D. Lough, was collected in the 1930s by Mary Lee Keister Talbot:

Fort Seybert was located on the left hand side (west) of the South Fork River, and situated on an elevation which sloped rapidly to a ravine on the north and descended abruptly over a ledge of rocks to the river on the southeast. Westwardly a gradual incline sloped back to the mountain. The defense consisted of a circular stockade some thirty yards in diameter, consisting of logs or puncheons set on end in the ground, side by side, and rising to a height often of twelve feet. A puncheon door closed the entrance. Within the stockade stood the two storied block-house twenty-one feet square. From the upper loop-holes the open space about the fort could be swept by the rifles of the defenders.

=== The De Hass image ===
In his 1851 history , Wills De Hass provides a picture (a wood engraving) of Fort Seybert without attribution. The sources and authority of this image have never been verified. It represents the fort as being a large, square stockade, in the manner of a conventional combined trading post/fort of a somewhat later date, large enough to provide for a large garrison. This image has been used repeatedly by amateur historians as a source of information. De Hass described the fort as follows: "It was a rude enclosure, cut out of the heart of the forest, but sufficiently strong to have resisted any attack from the enemy had the inmates themselves been strong." People living in the vicinity of Fort Seybert in the 1930s and interviewed by Mary Lee Keister Talbot (1898-1983) stated that they could still trace the depression in the ground where the palisades were set on end, and could well remember when the depression was more distinct than it was then. They considered it impossible that the fort had consisted of almost a dozen log houses (as in the De Hass image) built so as to form a square or rectangle.
