= Lenape Nation of Pennsylvania =

Cultural organization in Pennsylvania

- Lenape Nation of Pennsylvania; The Lenape Nation Inc.
- Named after: Lenape people
- Formation: 1996, 2001
- Type: Nonprofit organization
- Tax ID no.: EIN 23-3025630
- Purpose: Cultural, Ethnic Awareness (A23)
- Headquarters: Stroudsburg, Pennsylvania, U.S.
- Location: Easton, Pennsylvania, U.S.
- Members: 397 (2021)
- Official language: English
- President: Ann Dapice
- Revenue: $72,080 (2022)
- Expenses: $64,050 (2022)
- Website: lenape-nation.org
- Formerly called: Eastern Lenape Nation

The Lenape Nation of Pennsylvania (LNPA) is one of more than a dozen cultural heritage organizations of individuals who claim to be descendants of the Lenape people, also known as Lenni-Lenape or Delaware people. They are based in Easton, Pennsylvania.

== Current status ==
Despite having the word nation in its name, the Lenape Nation of Pennsylvania is an unrecognized tribe neither a federally recognized tribe nor a state-recognized tribe. Pennsylvania currently has no federally recognized or state-recognized tribes. The organization is actively lobbying the Pennsylvania legislature for state recognition.

LNPA Chief of Education and Tribal Storykeeper Adam "Waterbear" DePaul said, "We were quite successful in that endeavor of hiding, and identifying and passing ourselves off as white." He says the tribe is trying to achieve state recognition, but it does not qualify for federal recognition. Canadian-American linguist K. David Harrison, who partnered with the LNPA on language classes, writes: “some Lenape stayed behind, hid, blended in, intermarried, or assimilated. Remaining in the traditional homeland of the Delaware Valley, their descendants also claim Lenape bloodlines.”

The federally recognized Delaware Nation regards the Lenape Nation of Pennsylvania as one of many fraudulent organizations claiming to be Lenape, as they have stated that they "do not acknowledge or work with any non-federally recognized groups ... in order to protect our sovereignty" and seek to prevent the "ongoing widespread misrepresentation." In a 2023 report, the Delaware Nation referred to the Lenape Nation of Pennsylvania as a CPAIN (Corporation Posing as an Indigenous Nation).

The Delaware Nation argues that no Lenape people exist outside the membership of the five federally recognized nations and that "because of the way our [Lenape] societies were set up, we left no relatives behind. Anyone who was ‘left behind’ of Lenape descent was absorbed and adopted into other legitimate tribes." They view the existence of CPAINs, such as the Lenape Nation of Pennsylvania, as a threat to tribal sovereignty alongside appropriating Lenape culture, language, lands, and much-needed resources. The Delaware Tribe of Indians views these groups as perpetuating the "continued exclusion [of the Lenape] from contemporary events and happenings [in their homeland]." The federally recognized Lenape tribes also view intermarriage with settlers and accepting American citizenship as relinquishing their rights as Lenape under their Indigenous legal order.

Journalist Samantha Spengler wrote: "Whether or not Lenape people continued to live covertly in Pennsylvania, it’s undisputed that there was no continuous tribal entity in the region." There are three federally recognized Lenape tribes in the United States and two in Canada.

== History ==
Bill "Whippoorwill" Thompson founded the group in 1998 as the Eastern Lenape Nation. In 1996 and again in 2001, the Lenape Nation of Pennsylvania formed The Lenape Nation, Inc., aka The Lenape Nation of Pa., Inc., a 501(c)(3) nonprofit organization, based in Easton, Pennsylvania. They trace their ancestry spiritually, genealogically and culturally to Lenape women who intermarried with European and African settlers in the 1700s. They filed a letter of intent with the Bureau of Indian Affairs to receive federal recognition in 2000. A bill to recognize them on the state level was attempted in 2002 but was rejected in committee. State Senator Doug Mastriano published a memo supporting LNPA's recognition in 2023.

There have been disputes between unrecognized groups in Pennsylvania, including the Lenape Nation of Pennsylvania. By 2009, a former Lenape Nation of Pennsylvania chief stated that "The Eastern Delaware Nations...they are a social group. They are not an indigenous tribe." The Lenape Nation of Pennsylvania has historically supported bills that grant themselves state recognition while barring other unrecognized groups from being recognized. In 2002, they opposed a bill that "would grant recognition to any group or individual who can prove that their ancestors were living in Pennsylvania before 1790. A board composed of political appointees and Native Americans would oversee applications for recognition. What documentation is necessary for proving residency before 1790 is spelled out in the bill." Their stated opposition to the bill was because it would enable the recognition of groups not Indigenous to Pennsylvania. Settlers opposed the bill because of fears over casinos being built in the state despite unrecognized groups stating they have no intentions to build casinos.

== Corporate administration ==
Its current administration is:

- President: Ann Dapice
- Vice President: Richard Welker
- Treasurer: Maurice DeMund (2022)
- Assistant Treasurer: Perry Power (2022)
- Secretary: Barbara Michalski

Maurice C. DeMund served as president until April 2022. The group has also been based in Stroudsburg, Pennsylvania.

During their operations, the Claneil Foundation gave them $10,000; PayPal Giving Fund donated $7,646 and $10,464; Rockefeller Foundation gave a grant of $750; and the AmazonSmile Foundation gave them $481. The Unitarian Congregation, a church in West Chester, Pennsylvania, decided to pay reparations to the Lenape Nation of Pennsylvania. Tattooed Mom, a bar in Philadelphia, Pennsylvania, also donated some of their revenues to the LNPA.

== Activities ==
The Lenape Nation of Pennsylvania operates a cultural center in Easton, Pennsylvania. They host an annual powwow at Mauch Chunk Lake Park in present-day Jim Thorpe, Pennsylvania. Their members consider themselves stewards of the Delaware River watershed and once every four years, they host Rising Nation River Journey along the river. During the trip, the LNPA signs a nonlegally binding treaty with various organizations. They also created the Lenape Nation Scholarship Fund. They were given an exhibit by the University of Pennsylvania called 'Fulfilling a Prophecy: The Past and Present of the Lenape in Pennsylvania' and established their own museum in 2010. They've adopted various Plains Indian and Aridoamerican cultural practices as part of the Panindian movement.

LNPA member Shelley DePaul and Theodore Fernald launched a Lenape language class at Swarthmore College in Swarthmore, Pennsylvania, beginning in 2009. Shelley De Paul spent four decades compiling materials for the program making it conversational and avoiding technical aspects of the language such as grammar. For example, she refers to animate nouns, inanimate nouns, and various classes of verbs as living words, non-living words and action words. She also self-coined a Lenape word to refer to "matters of grammar" that means a flow of words. Afterwards, in 2019, Shelley DePaul held monthly in-person Lenape language learning classes for members of the LNPA which later transitioned to Zoom. In 2022, about one-third of the participants in these classes are LNPA members and close friends.

== See also ==
- List of federally recognized tribal governments of Lenape
  - Delaware First Nation of Six Nations, Ontario (member of the Haudenosaunee Confederacy)
  - Delaware Nation, Oklahoma
  - Delaware Nation at Moraviantown, Ontario (Christian Munsee)
  - Delaware Tribe of Indians, Oklahoma
  - Munsee-Delaware Nation, Ontario
  - Stockbridge-Munsee Community, Wisconsin (Partially Lenape, also Mohican)
- List of organizations and groups that self-identify as Lenape
  - Delaware Moors, Delaware and Southern New Jersey
  - Lenape Indian Tribe of Delaware, Delaware
  - Nanticoke Indian Association, Delaware
  - Nanticoke Lenni-Lenape Tribal Nation, New Jersey
  - Powhatan Renape Nation, New Jersey
  - Ramapough Mountain Indians, New Jersey
