= Netawatwees =

Lenape leader

- Netahutquemaled, Netodwehement, or Netautwhalemund

Lenape leader
- Succeeded by: White Eyes

Personal details
- Born: c. 1686 Probably Delaware River valley
- Died: 1776
- Children: Son Bemino (John Killbuck Sr.), grandson Gelelemend (John Killbuck Jr.)

Netawatwees or King Newcomer (c. 1686–1776, Lenape) was Sachem (principal Chief) and spiritual leader of the Delaware. His name, meaning "skilled advisor" or "first in council," is spelled in a variety of ways including Netaut Twelement, Na-taut-whale-mund, Neattawatways, Netahutquemaled, and Netodwehement.

During the French and Indian War, he escaped some of the hostilities by migrating to the confluence of the Tuscarawas and Muskingum rivers, where he was chief of Gekelukpechink village. Later he moved to the village of Coshocton, a center of Lenape settlement on the Tuscarawas. Both these villages were in present-day Ohio. He was among the signatories of the Fort Pitt treaty with Continental/United States forces. He allied with the rebels in the hope of gaining an all-Native American state in the new nation.

== Biography ==
Netawatwees was probably born in the lower Delaware River Valley around 1686. He was part of the Unami-speaking Lenape, the southern part of this mid-Atlantic coastal people whose territory extended to the lower Hudson River, western Long Island, and Connecticut. When he was young, he moved west with his family and band to escape encroachment from European-American colonists. In July 1758, he was living in a Delaware settlement at the mouth of Beaver Creek, a tributary of the Ohio River below present-day Pittsburgh. Records identify him as "ye great man of the Unami nation."

Netawatwees moved to Ohio with other migrant Delaware during the French and Indian War (1754–63). He favored alliances with the English in that conflict, which was part of the Seven Years' War between England and France in Europe. He established a village near present-day Cuyahoga Falls.

From there, he moved to the Tuscarawas, a tributary of the Muskingum, where he became a chief of the Delaware town called Gekelukpechink, meaning "still water." This town, which became known as Newcomer's Town, was on the north bank of the Tuscarawas. Present-day Newcomerstown developed west of here.

Although Netawatwees never converted to Christianity, he was influenced by the Moravian missionaries. Infirm in his old age, he was succeeded by White Eyes in 1776. In his dying words on October 31, 1776, Netawatwees was said to plead with the Delaware to follow the teachings of the Moravian pastors.

== Family ==
Netawatwees married and he and his wife had a family together. Their son Bemino (John Killbuck Sr.) became a renowned war leader allied with the French during the French and Indian War. His grandson was Gelelemend (1737–1811), or John Killbuck Jr., who was a chief active during the American Revolutionary War.
