= Newcomerstown, Ohio =

- Village
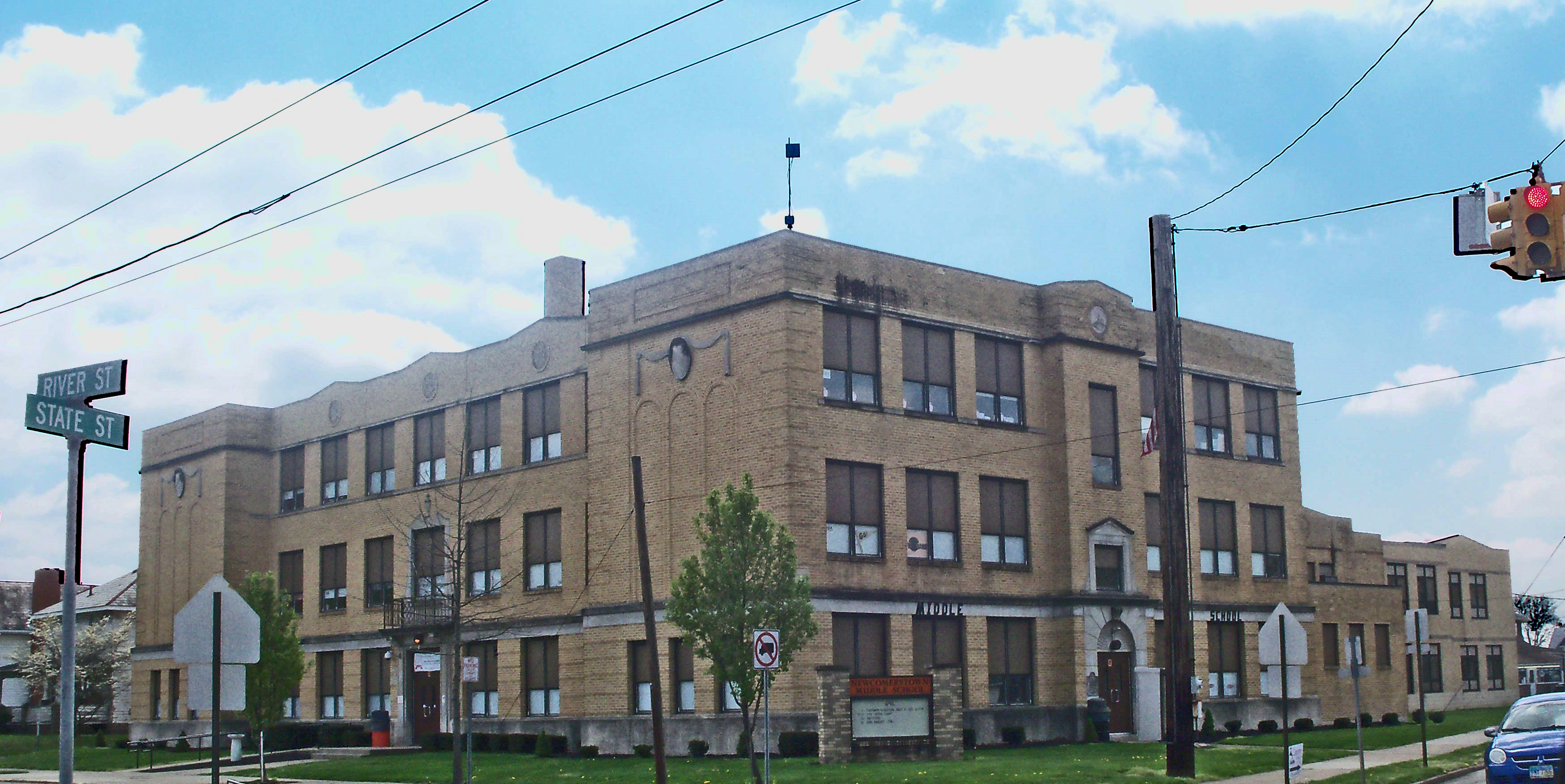
- Newcomerstown Middle School
- Motto: "Hometown Archive of Memories"
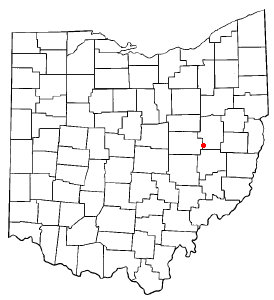
- Location of Newcomerstown, Ohio

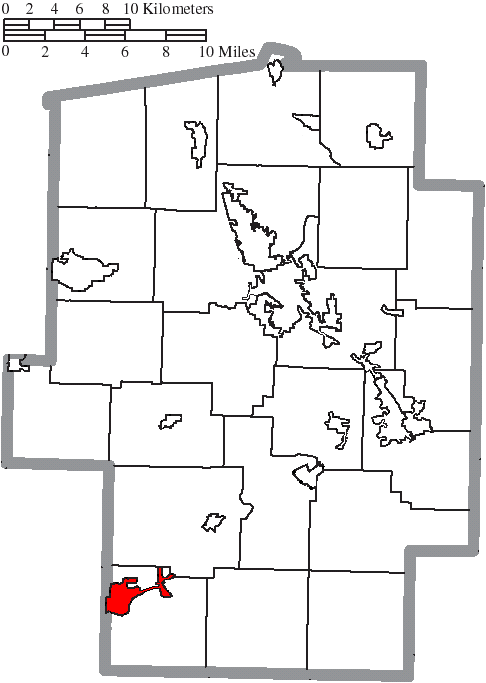
- Location of Newcomerstown in Tuscarawas County
- Coordinates: 40°16′34″N 81°35′43″W
- Country: United States
- State: Ohio
- County: Tuscarawas
- Townships: Oxford, Salem

Area
  - Total: 2.97 sq mi (7.68 km^{2})
  - Land: 2.86 sq mi (7.42 km^{2})
  - Water: 0.10 sq mi (0.26 km^{2})
- Elevation: 804 ft (245 m)

Population (2020)
  - Total: 3,702
  - Density: 1,293.0/sq mi (499.22/km^{2})
- Time zone: UTC-5 (Eastern (EST))
  - Summer (DST): UTC-4 (EDT)
- ZIP code: 43832
- Area code: 740
- FIPS code: 39-54432
- GNIS feature ID: 2399492
- Website: http://www.newcomerstownoh.com/

Newcomerstown (NEW-kum-ərs-town) is a village in Tuscarawas County, Ohio, United States, 85 miles (137 km) east-northeast of Columbus. The population was 3,702 at the 2020 census.

== History ==
The name comes from a Lenape (Delaware) village established in the 1760s by Netawatwees (c. 1686-1776), also known as Newcomer. Newcomer migrated to the area from Cuyahoga Falls with his band of Lenape Indians. The Lenape name of the town was Gekelukpechink, meaning "still water." The town was used as a meeting place for the Iroquois Great Council, and English and American traders called it Newcomer's town. By 1771, more than one hundred dwellings had been built. In 1776, more than seven hundred Lenape and several traders lived in the town. Soon after the start of the American Revolutionary War, the Lenape moved west to Coshocton.

In 1971, Newcomerstown elected 19-year-old Ronald Hooker as its mayor, making him one of the two youngest elected officials in United States history according to LIFE magazine. Hooker, a junior at Ashland College who did not smoke, drink, or swear, campaigned on a platform of increasing local industry and cracking down on "young hotrodders" who loudly raced up and down the streets at night while townspeople were sleeping. More than two thirds of voters wrote in Hooker's name on their ballots.

== Geography ==
Newcomerstown is located along the Tuscarawas River.

According to the United States Census Bureau, the village has a total area of 2.94 square miles (7.61 km^{2}), of which 2.84 square miles (7.36 km^{2}) is land and 0.10 square miles (0.26 km^{2}) is water.

== Demographics ==
Historical population
Census	Pop.	Note	%±
1850	476		—
1860	577		21.2%
1870	791		37.1%
1880	926		17.1%
1890	1,251		35.1%
1900	2,659		112.5%
1910	2,943		10.7%
1920	3,389		15.2%
1930	4,265		25.8%
1940	4,564		7.0%
1950	4,514		−1.1%
1960	4,273		−5.3%
1970	4,155		−2.8%
1980	3,986		−4.1%
1990	4,012		0.7%
2000	4,008		−0.1%
2010	3,822		−4.6%
2020	3,702		−3.1%
U.S. Decennial Census

=== 2020 census ===
As of the 2020 census, Newcomerstown had a population of 3,702. The median age was 41.2 years. 22.2% of residents were under the age of 18 and 20.2% of residents were 65 years of age or older. For every 100 females there were 91.1 males, and for every 100 females age 18 and over there were 88.6 males age 18 and over.

0.0% of residents lived in urban areas, while 100.0% lived in rural areas.

There were 1,568 households in Newcomerstown, of which 27.1% had children under the age of 18 living in them. Of all households, 39.2% were married-couple households, 20.1% were households with a male householder and no spouse or partner present, and 31.7% were households with a female householder and no spouse or partner present. About 34.2% of all households were made up of individuals and 17.4% had someone living alone who was 65 years of age or older.

There were 1,788 housing units, of which 12.3% were vacant. The homeowner vacancy rate was 3.2% and the rental vacancy rate was 11.1%.

Racial composition as of the 2020 census
Race	Number	Percent
White	3,428	92.6%
Black or African American	65	1.8%
American Indian and Alaska Native	9	0.2%
Asian	11	0.3%
Native Hawaiian and Other Pacific Islander	0	0.0%
Some other race	6	0.2%
Two or more races	183	4.9%
Hispanic or Latino (of any race)	68	1.8%

=== 2010 census ===
As of the census of 2010, there were 3,822 people, 1,598 households, and 982 families living in the village. The population density was 1,345.8 inhabitants per square mile (519.6/km^{2}). There were 1,798 housing units at an average density of 633.1 per square mile (244.4/km^{2}). The racial makeup of the village was 95.6% White, 1.6% African American, 0.2% Native American, 0.3% Asian, 0.5% from other races, and 1.8% from two or more races. Hispanic or Latino of any race were 1.2% of the population.

There were 1,598 households, of which 30.0% had children under the age of 18 living with them, 42.3% were married couples living together, 13.5% had a female householder with no husband present, 5.7% had a male householder with no wife present, and 38.5% were non-families. 33.7% of all households were made up of individuals, and 16.3% had someone living alone who was 65 years of age or older. The average household size was 2.35 and the average family size was 2.98.

The median age in the village was 40.3 years. 24.1% of residents were under the age of 18; 8.7% were between the ages of 18 and 24; 23.2% were from 25 to 44; 26.4% were from 45 to 64; and 17.6% were 65 years of age or older. The gender makeup of the village was 47.4% male and 52.6% female.

=== 2000 census ===
As of the census of 2000, there were 4,008 people, 1,654 households, and 1,063 families living in the village. The population density was 1,619.7 inhabitants per square mile (625.4/km^{2}). There were 1,817 housing units at an average density of 734.3 per square mile (283.5/km^{2}). The racial makeup of the village was 95.83% White, 2.57% African American, 0.25% Native American, 0.07% Asian, 0.20% from other races, and 1.07% from two or more races. Hispanic or Latino of any race were 0.72% of the population.

There were 1,654 households, out of which 31.4% had children under the age of 18 living with them, 46.8% were married couples living together, 13.2% had a female householder with no husband present, and 35.7% were non-families. 31.0% of all households were made up of individuals, and 16.0% had someone living alone who was 65 years of age or older. The average household size was 2.37 and the average family size was 2.96.

In the village, the population was spread out, with 26.1% under the age of 18, 7.8% from 18 to 24, 26.9% from 25 to 44, 21.2% from 45 to 64, and 17.9% who were 65 years of age or older. The median age was 38 years. For every 100 females there were 86.9 males. For every 100 females age 18 and over, there were 81.8 males.

The median income for a household in the village was $27,414, and the median income for a family was $34,464. Males had a median income of $26,703 versus $18,375 for females. The per capita income for the village was $15,946. About 12.0% of families and 16.0% of the population were below the poverty line, including 26.2% of those under age 18 and 11.4% of those age 65 or over.

== Notable people ==
- Norman Bel Geddes, theatrical and industrial designer, nephew of Manuel Yingling
- William Burress, film actor
- Woody Hayes, football player and legendary Ohio State Buckeyes football coach
- Frank LaPorte, Major League Baseball infielder
- R. Beers Loos, American journalist and newspaper publisher, father of playwright and author, Anita Loos
- Netawatwees, western Lenape chief
- Cy Young, Hall of Fame pitcher, honored by Major League Baseball's annual Cy Young Award
