= North Shore (Pittsburgh) =

- Neighborhood of Pittsburgh
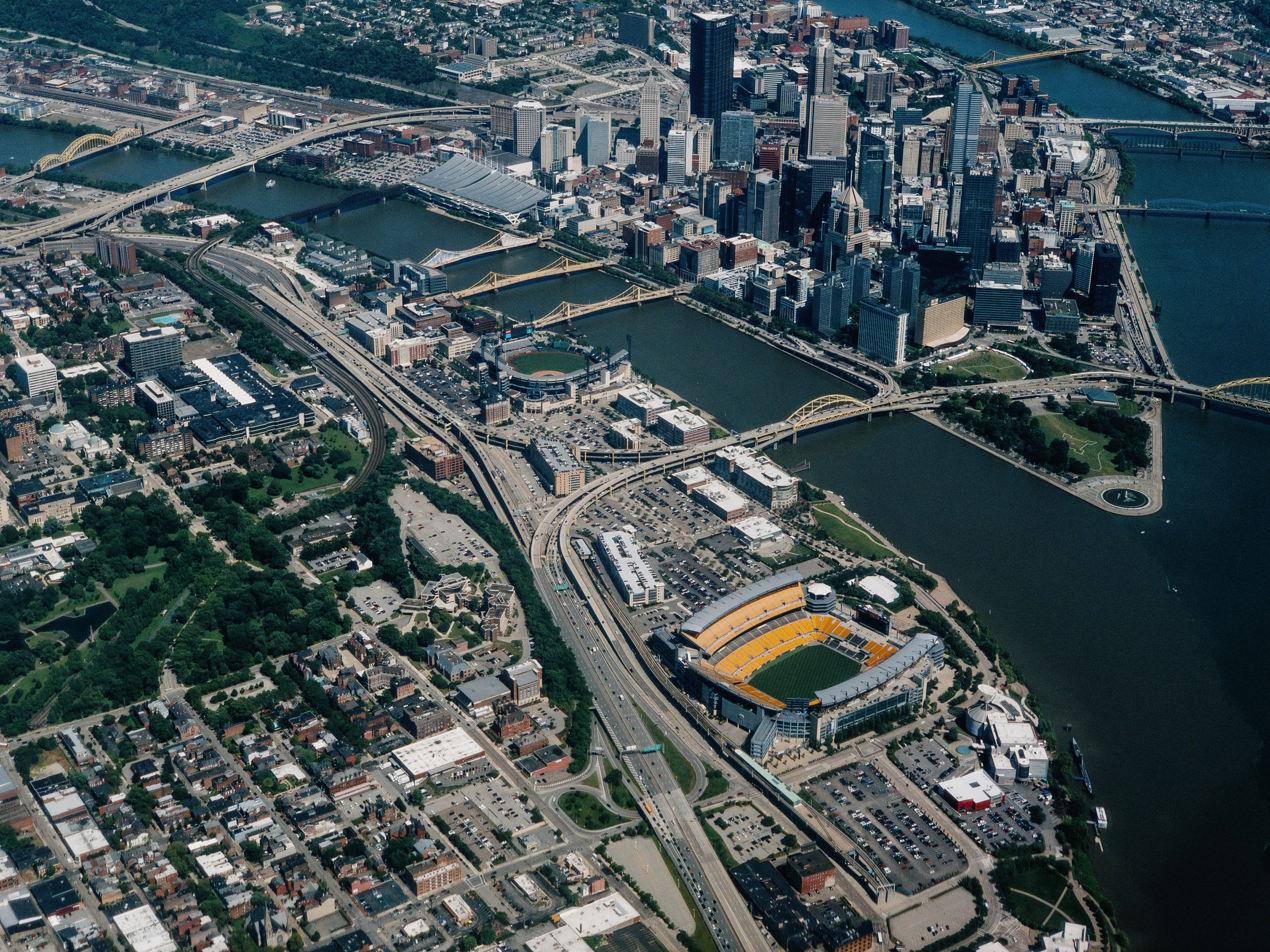
- North Shore (left) lies across the Allegheny River from Downtown Pittsburgh

- Coordinates: 40.447°N 80.009°W
- Country: United States
- State: Pennsylvania
- County: Allegheny County
- City: Pittsburgh

Area
  - Total: 0.303 sq mi (0.78 km^{2})

Population (2010)
  - Total: 303
  - Density: 1,000/sq mi (386/km^{2})
- Time zone: Eastern Standard Time
- ZIP Code: 15212
- Area code: 412

North Shore is a neighborhood in Pittsburgh's North Side. Its zip code is 15212.

It is home to Acrisure Stadium, PNC Park, and The Andy Warhol Museum.

== History and features ==
Much of the modern North Shore, particularly the area now occupied by Acrisure Stadium and the Kamin Science Center, was once the site of Smoky Island (also known as Killbuck Island), a landform in the Allegheny River that gradually disappeared by the late 19th century.

Developing rapidly around and between the two stadiums, the neighborhood has representation on Pittsburgh City Council by council members for District 1 (North Neighborhoods) and 6 (North Shore/Downtown Neighborhoods).

Two light rail stations opened in the neighborhood in spring 2012:

- North Side near General Robinson Street & Tony Dorsett Drive. Serves PNC Park. (underground)
- Allegheny near Allegheny Avenue & Reedsdale Street. Serves Acrisure Stadium. (elevated)

== Future development ==
In October 2014, two 11-story office skyscrapers were proposed for the area by local parking lot manager Alco Parking. The project is likely to move forward, as soon as an anchor tenant can be found.

== Surrounding and adjacent Pittsburgh neighborhoods ==
North Shore runs along the Allegheny River and its confluence with the Monongahela River to form the Ohio River. It is bordered by Chateau to the west, Allegheny West to the northwest, Allegheny Center to the north, East Allegheny to the northeast, and Troy Hill to the east. The Roberto Clemente, Andy Warhol, and Rachel Carson Bridges provide direct links to Downtown Pittsburgh as do the first southbound exits across the Veterans and Fort Duquesne Bridges.

== See also ==
- List of Pittsburgh neighborhoods

== Gallery ==
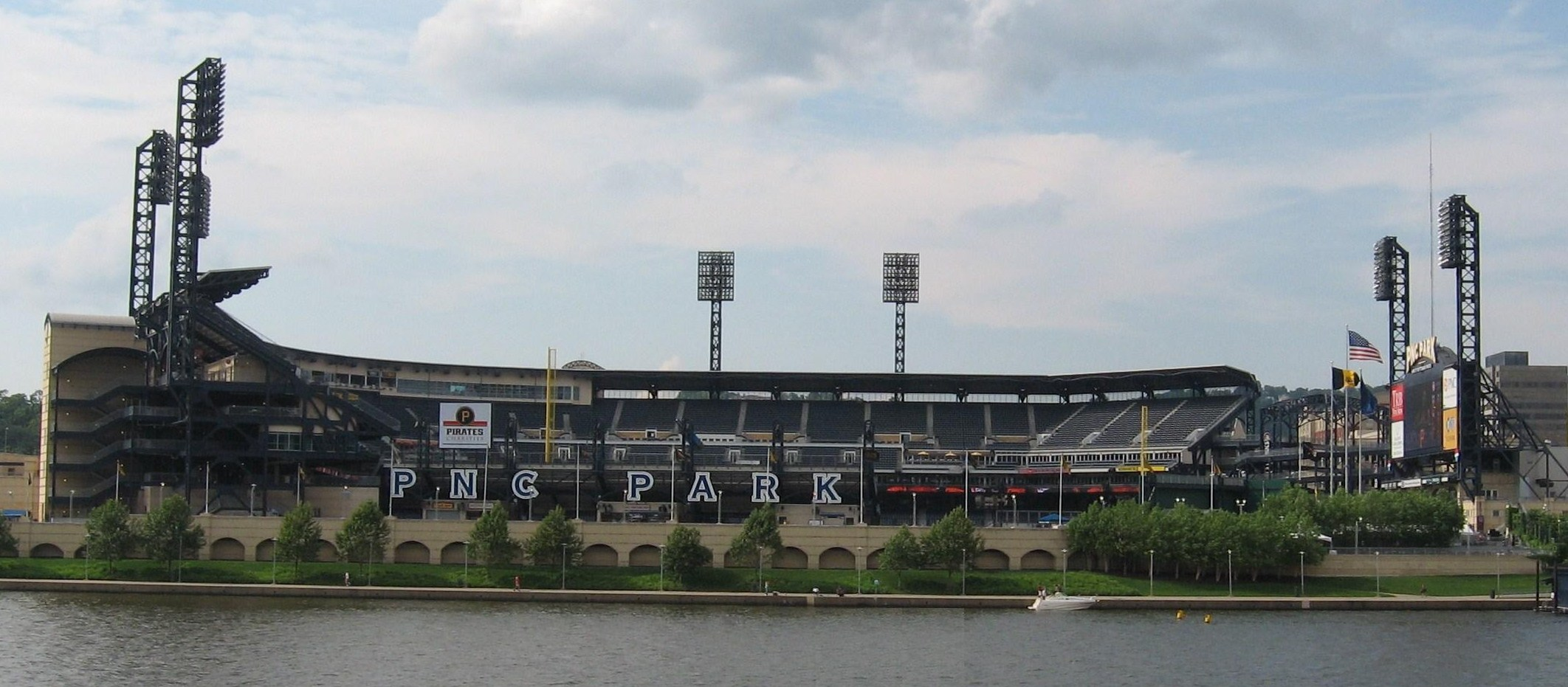
PNC Park on the North Shore, with the Allegheny River visible in the foreground.

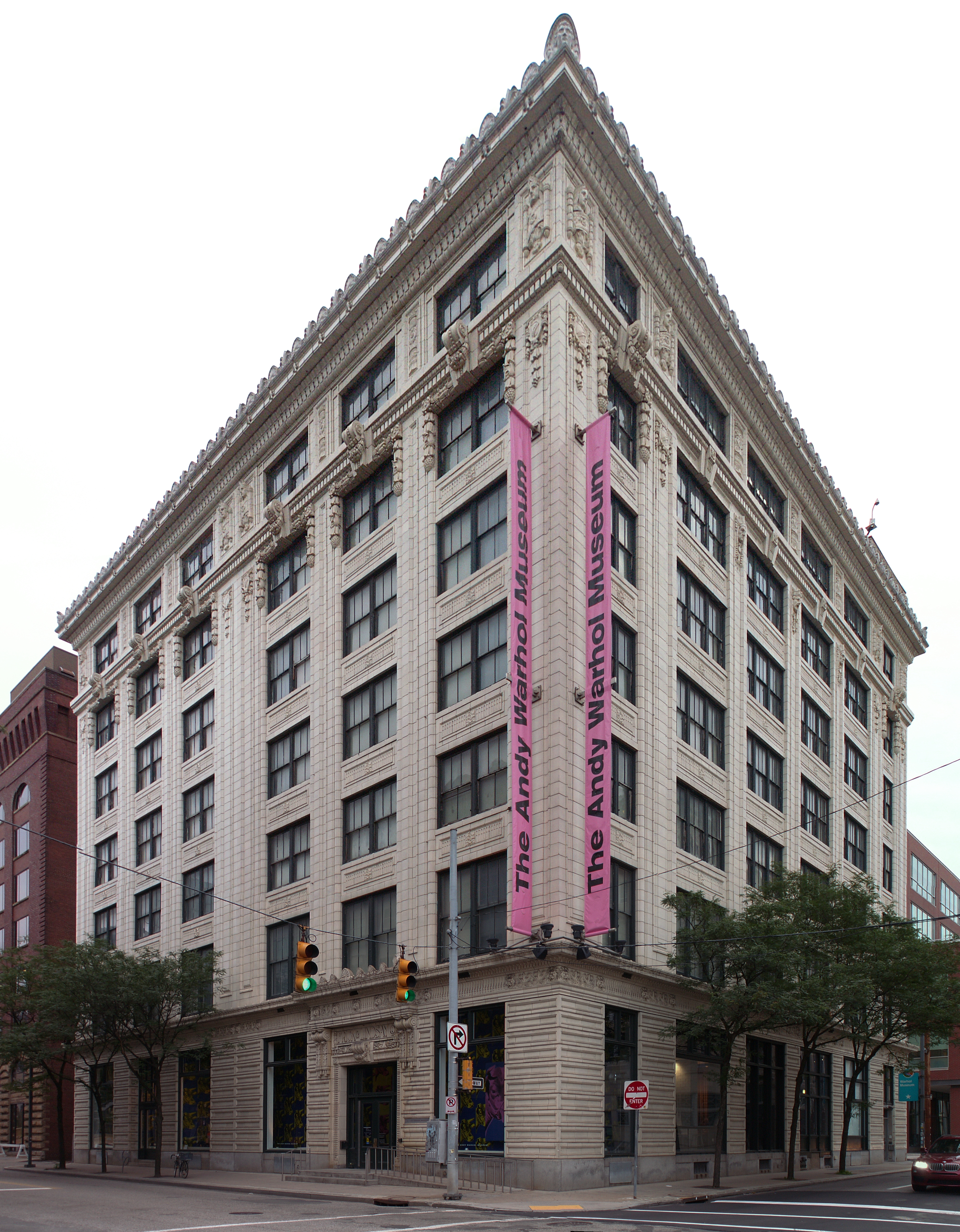
The Andy Warhol Museum, an art museum displaying the work of Pittsburgh-born pop art icon Andy Warhol, located at 117 Sandusky Street.

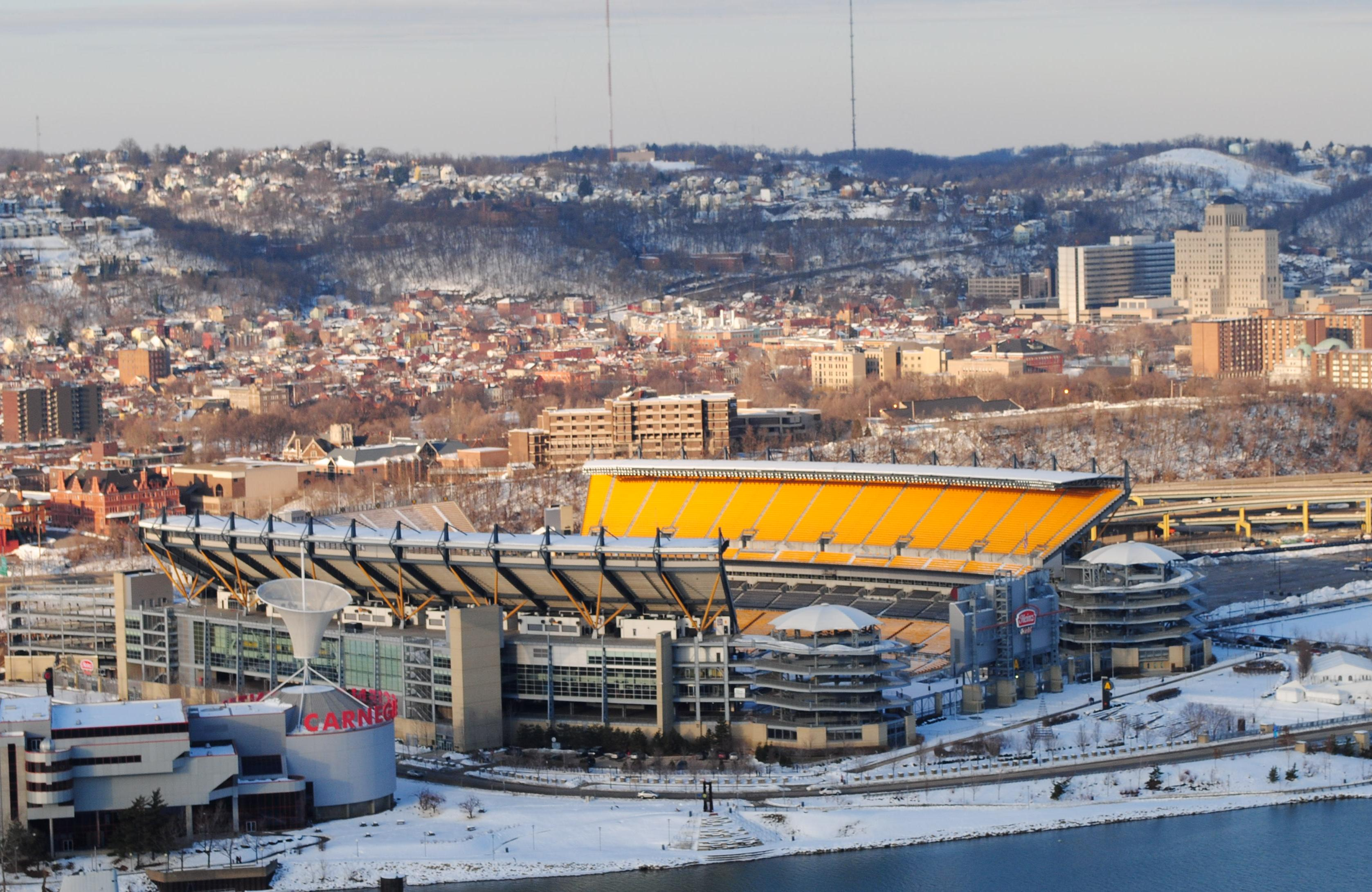
Heinz Field on the North Shore, with the Ohio River visible in the foreground and the Kamin Science Center to the left.

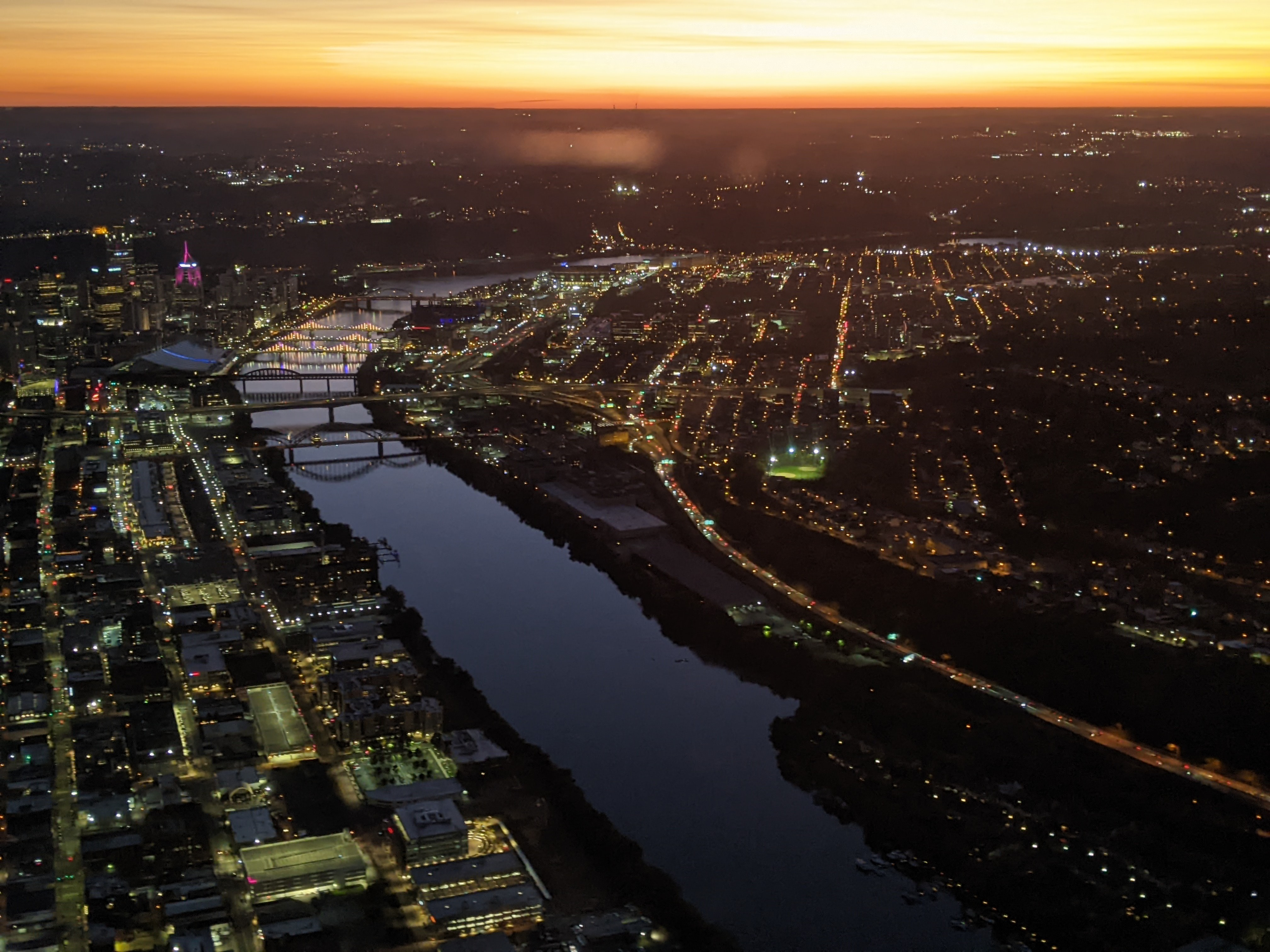
North Shore at dusk
