= Gelelemend =

Lenape leader (c. 1737/1741–1811)

- Killbuck, John Killbuck Jr., William Henry

Delaware (Lenape) leader

Personal details
- Born: c. 1737/1741 Near the Lehigh River in Pennsylvania
- Died: 1811 (aged 69–70) Goshen, Ohio
- Relations: Grandson of Netawatwees
- Parent: Bemino

Gelelemend (c.1737 of 1741–1811) (Lenape), also known as Killbuck or John Killbuck Jr., was an important Delaware (Lenape) principal Chief during the American Revolutionary War. He supported the rebel Americans, known as Patriots. His name signifies "a leader." He became principal chief of the Lenape in November 1778, following the death of White Eyes, a war chief and Speaker of the Delaware Head Council. Gelelemend succeeded his maternal grandfather Netawatwees.

Due to undifferentiated American attacks against the Lenape during the war, chiefs of other clans switched to ally with the British. After being pushed out as principal chief, Gelelemend led an American attack on a major Lenape town. He retreated to Fort Pitt. After the war, he converted to Christianity at the Moravians’s Salem, Ohio mission, where he took the Christian name of "William Henry."

== Biography ==
Gelelemend was born near the Lehigh River in Pennsylvania, son of Bemino (John Killbuck Sr.) and his wife. His father became a renowned war leader during the French and Indian War. Under the matrilineal kinship system of the Lenape, Gelemend was born into his mother's Turtle clan, which had responsibility for providing hereditary chiefs for the tribe. His paternal grandfather was Netawatwees ("Newcomer"), principal chief of the Delaware.

At that time, the Lenape had three clans or phratries: Turtle, Turkey, and Wolf. Children were considered born into their mother's clan, which determined their social status in the tribe. The mother's eldest brother was more important to them in shaping their lives than was their biological father. The Lenape were required to marry outside their clan. Each clan had its own chiefs, councilors, and war captains, as well as a distinct role for serving the tribe.

The Turtle phratry was considered the senior clan, with the role of leading the tribe. Their hereditary chief served as principal chief of the Lenape. By early 1776, the Moravian missionary David Zeisberger recorded that Gelelemend had been "designated" as the successor to his paternal grandfather Netawatwees, who was thought to be close to 100 years old. After Netawatwees died on October 31, 1776, Gelelemend became Chief of the Turkey Clan (Pële).

The British controlled Detroit as well as areas of the Eastern seaboard, where the Patriot rebels were most active. The Delaware tried to remain neutral in the British-American conflict. They were subjected to strong pressure to enter the conflict from the British, the Americans, and other Indian nations (most of whom allied with the British, in the hope of pushing American colonists out of their territories). Under these circumstances, White Eyes, who by 1773 had become Speaker of the Delaware Head Council, was in line matrilineally to become Chief of the Turtle Clan, and principal chief. With White Eyes and Captain Pipe (war captain of the Wolf clan), Gelelemend signed the Delaware Treaty with the United States in 1778. Only after the death of White Eyes later that year, who was murdered on November 5, 1778, by an American militia officer, did Gelelemend become principal chief of the Lenape.

But the Lenape remained deeply divided over how to respond to the encroachments and war. Following indiscriminate attacks by Continentals against the Lenape, bands led by Captain Pipe and Buckongahelas broke away from the pro-American leadership of Gelelemend. They allied with the British for the rest of the war. After the war, they resettled in Upper Canada, where they were granted land by the Crown.

By 1781, Gelelemend had been forced from power. He was commissioned as a colonel and helped guide Colonel Daniel Brodhead in an expedition to destroy the Delaware capital of Coshocton in Ohio, where he had lived and served as chief. The raid found only 15 young warriors, who were bound and killed. With a few of his followers, Gelelemend returned with the Americans to Fort Pitt. The raid on Coshocton was condemned; Washington court-martialed Broadhead and removed him from command. Gelelemend had become a man without a country. He lived at Fort Pitt until 1785.

Long interested in Christianity, Gelelemend joined the Moravian mission at Salem, Ohio in 1788. At the baptism ceremony, he took the name William Henry, supposedly to honor a man who had rescued him during the French and Indian War. He was the most prominent convert in the Lenape community. Gelelemend died in Goshen Township, Tuscarawas County, Ohio in 1811.

== Legacy ==
The village of Killbuck, Ohio, in Holmes County, is named for Gelelemend. By contrast, the town of Kill Buck, New York—spelled as two words—does not derive its name from him. Gelelemend's name is also commemorated in Killbuck Island, a former island in the Allegheny River at Pittsburgh, Pennsylvania.

To honor William Henry, many of Gelelemend's descendants were given Henry as a middle name. Among them was his great-grandson, John Henry Kilbuck, a Moravian missionary in Alaska, who named his daughter Katherine Henry Kilbuck in tribute to the family's heritage.

== Sources ==
- Jordan, Francis. The Life of William Henry, of Lancaster, Pennsylvania, 1729–1786, Patriot, Military Officer, Inventor of the Steamboat; A Contribution to Revolutionary History. Lancaster, Pa.: New Era Printing Company, 1910. Pp. 7–18, online at Internet Archive.
- Olmstead, Earl. P. Blackcoats Among the Delaware: David Zeisberger on the Ohio Frontier, Kent, Ohio: Kent State University Press: 1991. Pp. 220–23.
- Ballard, Jan. "In the Steps of Gelelemend: John Henry Killbuck", Jacobsburg Record (Publication of the Jacobsburg Historical Society). Volume 33, Issue 1 (Winter, 2005): 4–5.
- Wellenreuther, Hermann and Carola Wessel, eds., The Moravian Mission Diaries of David Zeisberger, 1772–1781. University Park, Pa: Pennsylvania University Press, 2005.
- Wellenreuther, Hermann. "The Succession of Head Chiefs and the Delaware Culture of Consent: The Delaware Nation, David Zeisberger, and Modern Ethnography", In A. G. Roeber, ed., Ethnographies and Exchanges: Native Americans, Moravians, and Catholics in Early America. University Park, Pa.: Pennsylvania State University Press, 2008. 31–48.
- Gordon, Scott Paul. Two William Henrys: Indian and White Brothers in Arms and Faith in Colonial and Revolutionary America. Jacobsburg Historical Society, 2010.
