= Bemino =

Shawnee and Delaware medicine man

Bemino (fl. 1710s–1780s, Delaware)—known as John Killbuck Sr. to white settlers, was a renowned medicine man, Chief, and war leader of Delaware (Lenape) and Shawnee warriors during the French and Indian War (1754–63). Killbuck, Ohio is named in his honor.

He was a son of Netawatwees, at one time principal chief of the Delaware (Lenape). Bemino lived with his people in what is now eastern Ohio. During the war he allied with the French against British settlers and engaged with his warrior bands in attacks mostly in the upper Potomac River watershed, in what is now the Eastern Panhandle of West Virginia. His son Gelelemend (John Killbuck Jr.), was a Delaware chief during the American Revolutionary War.

== Biography ==
=== Early years ===
Bemino was born into a Delaware, or Lenape (their autonym) family. This is an Algonquian language and the people historically occupied territory along the mid-Atlantic coast, from present-day Connecticut to New Jersey and Delaware, including Long Island in New York. They were gradually pushed out of this area by European colonists.

As the Delaware (Lenape) had a matrilineal kinship system, Bemino would have been considered born into his mother's family and clan, which would have determined his social status. Within the Delaware system, Bemino is believed to have belonged to either the Turtle or the Turkey clan. Phratries were the next level of kinship in tribes with an uneven number of clans. This division grouped certain clans together. Marriages had to be exogamous; that is, taking place with a member of a clan other than one's own.

He may have been born or raised in what is now eastern Ohio, where his father, Sachem (principal Chief) and Spiritual Leader Netawatwees, and family had migrated from the Delaware River Valley by pressure from European (white) colonists. Bemino became a medicine man.

By the 1740s and '50s, Bemino was well acquainted with white settler families in the valley of the South Branch Potomac River, in what is now the Eastern Panhandle of West Virginia. This river and region were known at that time to Indians and whites alike as Wappocomo. This was likely a Lenape or Shawnee word related to the physical character or geography of the place; both tribes spoke Algonquian languages.

Bemino developed a good reputation with the new white settlers. Shortly before the outbreak of the French and Indian War (1754), colonist Peter Casey hired Bemino to retrieve a "runaway negro" (or, by another account, a runaway "Irish servant"). In trying to collect his payment, however, he quarreled with Casey, who knocked him to the ground with a cane. Bemino long held a grudge against the settler. Through the subsequent hostilities, he tried to find an opportunity to kill Casey but was not successful.

Bemino also lived for a time among white families further east in colonial Virginia, where he became familiar with their habits and resources. This information was invaluable when he allied himself with the French rather than the British during the war.

=== French and Indian War ===
While Great Britain and France conducted most of their hostilities of the Seven Years' War in Europe, the North American front became known (in the British colonies) as the French and Indian War . After the outbreak of hostilities at the Battle of Jumonville Glen in Pennsylvania (May 28, 1754), Bemino was among those Indian leaders siding with the French against the British.

In March or April 1756, Bemino is said to have led Lenape and Shawnee warriors in an ambush (the "Battle of the Trough") of Virginian settlers near Fort Pleasant, in what is now Hardy County, West Virginia. A one- or two-hour firefight left seven whites (out of about 18) dead, as against three Indians (out of 60 or 70). At around the same time, Bemino and a small band encountered Vincent Williams, a settler on Patterson's Creek, some 9 miles across Patterson Creek Mountain from Fort Pleasant. They besieged him in his house: Bemino's band lost 5 of 7 warriors, but they finally killed Williams. The survivors quartered his body in a ritual mutilation, putting the parts at the corners of the cabin, and impaled his head upon a fence stake at the front door. The house, with many additions, still stands with the old Williams family graveyard nearby, at Williamsport, West Virginia (named for the settler), in present-day Grant County.

Bemino was involved in an engagement known as the Battle of Great Cacapon, on April 18, 1756. Several years after the war, Bemino described how he and a band of Indians (probably composed of both Delaware and Shawnee) killed two men near Fort Edwards, not far from the Cacapon River. (This is now Hampshire County, West Virginia). They left a trail of corn meal from the site, and waited in ambush along a high stream bank.

Captain John Mercer led a band of militia (said to number either 40 or 100, depending on the source) in pursuit. When the unit passed the concealed warriors, they opened a crossfire, killing Mercer and 16 of his men. The warriors chased and killed survivors, and Bemino claimed that only six men of the militia escaped.

In 1756 or 1757, Bemino led a large warrior force toward Fort Cumberland, just across the Potomac River in Maryland. Agreeing to a parlay, Major Livingston, the garrison commander, admitted the leaders inside the gates. He detained them and, assuming that the encounter was a ruse, humiliated them (perhaps by dressing them in women's clothing) before expelling them from the fort.

Bemino and his mixed band of warriors attacked the British settler stockades at Fort Upper Tract and Fort Seybert (on the South Fork of the South Branch in what is now Pendleton County) on 27 and 28 April 1758, respectively. Fort Seybert (about 12 miles northeast of present-day Franklin) was occupied by about 30 people, mostly women and children, as only three were reported as adult males. After the defenders surrendered, the Indians spared only ten or eleven of the whites, taking them for captives. According to the son of one of the survivors:

They bound ten, whom they conveyed without the fort, and then proceeded to massacre the others in the following manner: They seated them in a row upon a log, with an Indian standing behind each; and at a given signal, each Indian sunk his tomahawk into the head of his victim: an additional blow or two dispatched them.

=== Later years ===
Bemino had married and had a son Gelelemend (John Killbuck Jr.). He became an important Delaware chief during the American Revolutionary War.

In April 1771, Captain Robert Callender wrote to Joseph Shippen Jr., reporting that he had met with Bemino and his son Gelelemend, who were asking for "assistance from His Majesty...that they may Establish Schools among them for Educating their Children, & Ministers for Preaching the Christian Religion...and Consequently annex them by the Strongest Ties to the English Interest." Callender supported this plan and was concerned that white settlers had made threats against the Lenape, adding: "I hope you will...Consider the Safety of these Wretches."

In his later years, the elderly Bemino was visited in the Ohio Country by the sons of Peter Casey and Vincent Williams. By this time he was quite feeble and completely blind. Upon hearing the name of Col. Vincent Williams, he said, "Your father was a brave warrior". Upon hearing that Benjamin Casey was Peter Casey's son, he said: "Your father owes me eight shillings; will you pay it?" During this visit, Bemino related many details of his exploits to the men, who recorded what would otherwise have been lost to history for lack of surviving eyewitnesses.

== Legacy ==
- Despite the bitter animosity between Bemino and the white settlers and officials during the French and Indian War, two places in Ohio were named for him: the town of Killbuck and the stream known as Killbuck Creek.
