= White Eyes =

Lenape chief

- Koquethagechton

Lenape leader
- Preceded by: Netawatwees (Newcomer)

Personal details
- Born: c. 1730 Somerset, Pennsylvania, British America
- Died: November 5, 1778
- Spouse(s): Rachel Doddridge, d. 1788
- Relations: Son was raised by his friend, George Morgan
- Children: George Morgan White Eyes (1770?–1798)
- Known for: Negotiated a Lenape state; peace emissary in Lord Dunmore's War; trader, tavern keeper; founded settlement near present day Coshocton, OH
- Nickname: George White Eyes

White Eyes, named Koquethagechton (c. 1730 – November 5, 1778), was Chief Sachem of the Lenape (Delaware) people in the Ohio Country during the era of the American Revolution. Sometimes known as George White Eyes, or Captain Grey Eyes al. Sir William, his given name in Lenape was rendered in many spelling variations in colonial records.

By 1773 he was Speaker of the Delaware Head Council and known as one of the most important councilors. White Eyes was a war chief and a tireless mediator in turbulent times, negotiating the first Native American treaties with the fledgling United States, and always working toward his ultimate goal of establishing a secure Native American territory. His assassination by an American militia officer is believed to have been covered up by United States officials.

== Early life and education ==
Born in Somerset, Pennsylvania, around 1730, White Eyes was a member of the turtle clan of the Lenape nation. His clan heritage marked him as a man in a position for leadership. Both his mother and father were Lenape leaders. Traditionally, the Lenape had lived in the Delaware River Valley.

== Migration and career ==
After the war, when European colonists began settling near the Lenape villages around Fort Pitt in western Pennsylvania, the Native Americans moved further west to Muskingum in the Muskingum River valley in present-day eastern Ohio. By this time, many Lenape had converted to Christianity under the influence of Moravian missionaries and lived in villages led by these missionaries. The missionary towns also moved to Muskingum, so that the Lenape, both Christian and non-Christian, could stay together. Though not a Christian, White Eyes ensured that the Christian Lenape remained members of the larger native community.

== Marriage and family ==
After becoming a chief, White Eyes married Rachel Doddridge (d. 1788), a young English colonist who had been taken captive as a 5-year-old child during a Lenape raid and adopted into the Lenape people, becoming fully assimilated. They had at least one son, named George Morgan White Eyes.

Rachel had been living with her father Philip Doddridge and family at a farm on Chartier's Creek near Statler's Fort (Washington County, Pennsylvania). Her cousin Philip Doddridge reported seeing her later as an adult at a trading post. Thoroughly assimilated by then, she was not interested in a reunion with her British relatives.

== Town in Ohio ==
White Eyes established his own town, known by the colonists as White Eyes' Town, near the Lenape capital of Coshocton, Ohio. By 1773 White Eyes served as Speaker of the Delaware Head Council, an important position and indication of his high reputation in the tribe. In 1774, the Lenape Grand Council, an association of chiefs, named White Eyes as principal chief of the nation.

In the early 1770s, violence on the frontier between whites and Indians threatened to escalate into open warfare. White Eyes unsuccessfully attempted to prevent what would become Lord Dunmore's War in 1774, fought primarily between the Shawnee and Virginia colonists. He served as a peace emissary between the two armies, and helped negotiate a treaty to end the war.

== Revolution and death ==
Lachlan McIntosh, who led an expedition which White Eyes joined in 1778

When the American Revolutionary War began soon after the end of Dunmore's War, White Eyes was negotiating a royal grant with Lord Dunmore to secure the Lenape territory in the Ohio Country. After the American revolutionaries forced Dunmore out of Virginia, White Eyes had to begin anew with the Americans.

In April 1776, he addressed the Continental Congress in Philadelphia on behalf of the Lenape. Two years later he completed an alliance of the Delaware with the United States by a treaty signed in 1778 at Fort Pitt. It promised to establish a Lenape state, with representation in the American Congress, provided that the Congress approved. The treaty provided for the Lenape to serve as guides for the Americans when they moved through the Ohio Country to strike at their British and Indian enemies to the north, in and around Detroit. In early November 1778, White Eyes joined an American expedition under General Lachlan McIntosh as a guide and negotiator.

Soon after, the Americans reported that White Eyes had contracted smallpox and died during the expedition. After his death, the Lenape alliance with the Americans eventually collapsed. The Americans by then had no interest in supporting a state under Lenape control. After his death, Gelelemend of the Turtle Clan became the principal chief of the Lenape as no other leader was qualified by clan.

== Assassination claim ==
Years later, George Morgan, a U.S. Indian agent, trader, and former close associate of White Eyes, wrote a letter to Congress claiming that the chief had been "treacherously put to death" by American militia in Michigan. Later documentation affirmed that White Eyes had been assassinated by an American militia officer on November 5, 1778. (Morgan had helped negotiate with Native Americans in the Fort Pitt area, so was closely involved in these matters.) He also wrote that the murder of White Eyes had been covered up to prevent the Lenape from abandoning the revolutionaries.

White Eyes' British-Lenape wife Rachel Doddridge was reportedly murdered by white men in 1788. Their mixed-race son George Morgan White Eyes (1770?–1798) was cared for by the family friend George Morgan. Later he was educated at the College of New Jersey (later Princeton University), where his tuition was paid by the Continental Congress. He graduated in 1789.

== Legacy and honors ==
- White Eyes Township in Coshocton County, Ohio was named after the chief as a tribute to his leadership and building an alliance with the revolutionaries.

== See also ==
- Gnadenhutten massacre
- Frontier warfare during the American Revolution
- Muskingum (village)
