= Lenape =

Indigenous people of the Northeastern Woodlands

Lenape Delaware people
Delaware: Lënapeyok
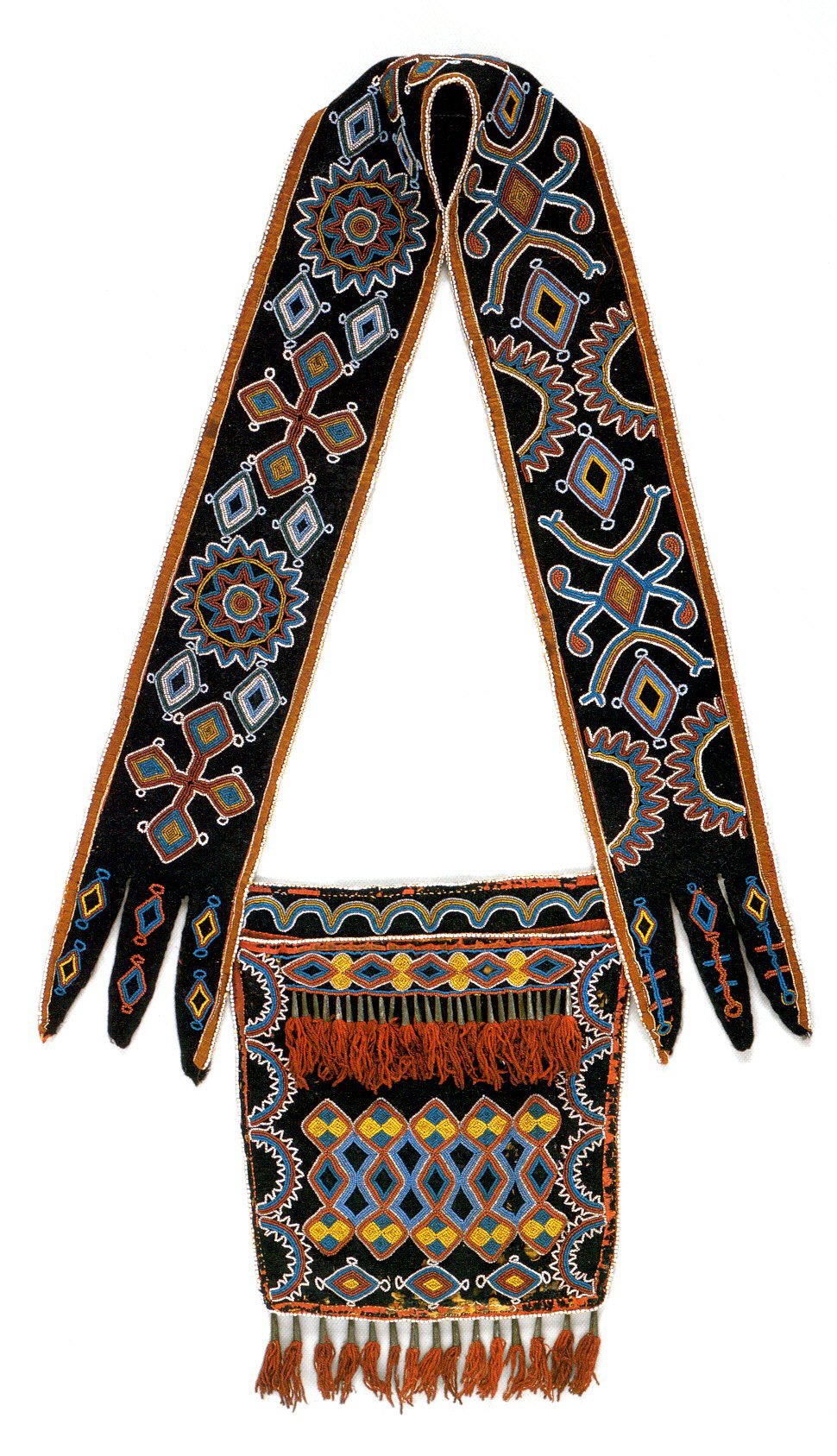
- 1870 Lenape bandolier bag from Kansas, at the Metropolitan Museum of Art

Total population
- c. 16,000

Regions with significant populations
- Oklahoma, U.S.: 11,195 (2010)
- Wisconsin, U.S.: 1,565
- Ontario, Canada: 2,300

Languages
- English, Munsee, and Unami as a second language

Religion
- Christianity, Native American Church, traditional tribal religion

Related ethnic groups
- Other Algonquian peoples

- Person: Lënape (Monsi / Wënami)
- People: Lënapeyok (Monsiyok / Wënamiyok)
- Language: Lënapei èlixsuwakàn (Monsii èlixsuwakàn / Wënami èlixsuwakàn)
- Country: Lënapehòkink

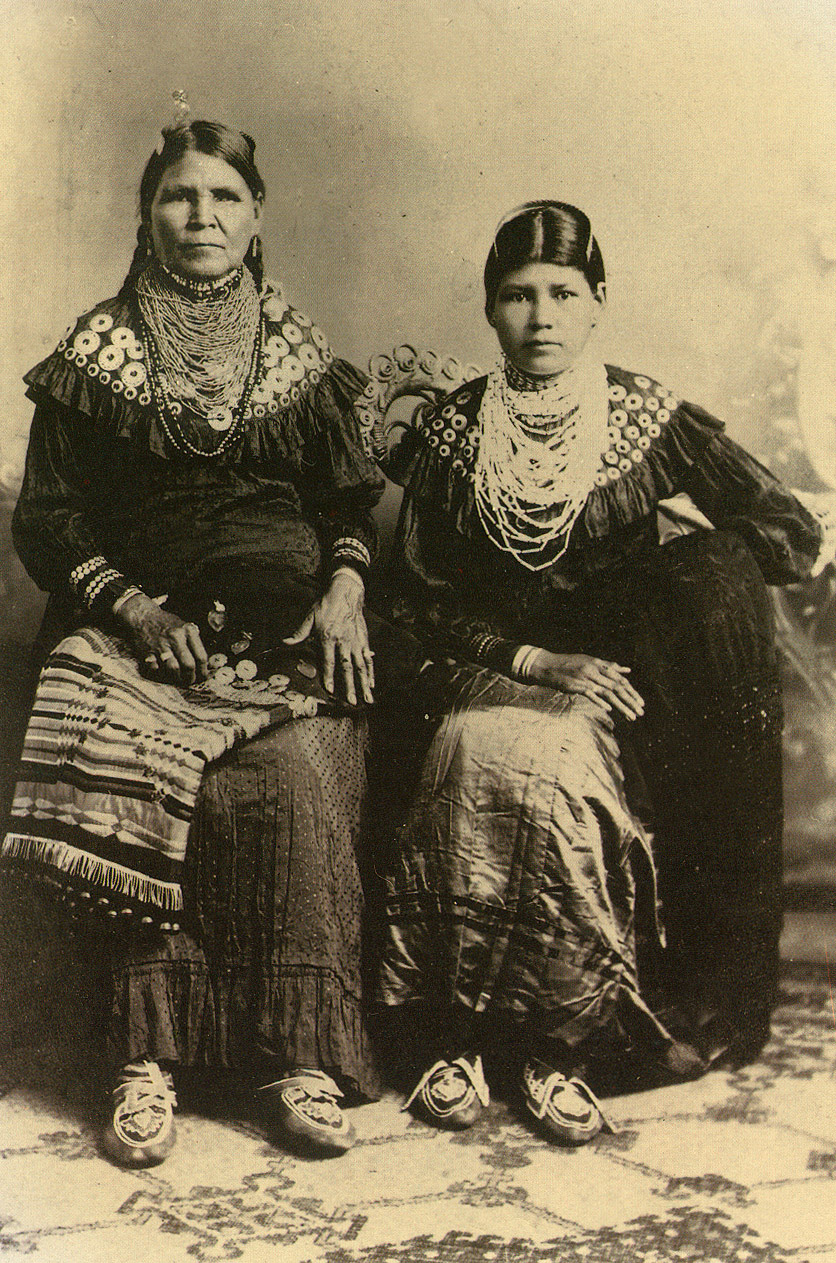
Two Delaware Nation citizens, Jennie Bobb and her daughter Nellie Longhat, in Oklahoma, in 1915

The Lenape (English: /ləˈnɑːpi/, /-peɪ/, /ˈlɛnəpi/; Lenape languages: [lənaːpe]), also called the Lenni Lenape and Delaware people, are an Indigenous people of the Northeastern Woodlands, who live in the United States and Canada.

The Lenape's historical territory included present-day northeastern Delaware, all of New Jersey, the eastern Pennsylvania regions of the Lehigh Valley and Northeastern Pennsylvania, and New York Bay, western Long Island, and the lower Hudson Valley in the state of New York. (Note: The Lenape's historic territories inside the divides of the frequently mountainous landforms flanking the Delaware River's drainage basin include (from south to north and then counter-clockwise): The Delaware River shores from the river's eastern mouth and the Atlantic sea coast to western Long Island, including both colonial New York City and colonial New Jersey; Portions of Western Connecticut up to present-day Massachusetts; Regions west of there from Albany, New York to the Susquehanna River side of the Catskills; Regions south of there through the eastern Poconos outside the rival Susquehannock lands through the present-day Lehigh Valley of colonial Pennsylvania, south through Philadelphia west of the Delaware River, and further south along a stretch of Atlantic sea coast in northern colonial Delaware.; The Susquehanna-Delaware watershed divides bound the frequently contested hunting grounds between the rival Susquehannock peoples and the Lenape peoples, and the Catskills and Berkshires served as a similar boundary in the northern regions during the colonial era.) Today communities are based in Oklahoma, Wisconsin, and Ontario.

During the last decades of the 18th century, European settlers and the effects of the American Revolutionary War displaced most Lenape from their homelands and pushed them north and west. In the 1860s, under the Indian removal policy, the U.S. federal government relocated most Lenape remaining in the Eastern United States to the Indian Territory and surrounding regions.

Federally recognized Lenape tribes are the Delaware Nation and Delaware Tribe of Indians in Oklahoma, and the Stockbridge–Munsee Community in Wisconsin. Lenape in Canada are the Munsee-Delaware Nation, Moravian of the Thames First Nation, and the Delaware First Nation of the Six Nations of the Grand River in Ontario.

== Name ==
The name Lenni Lenape originates from two autonyms, Lenni, which means "genuine, pure, real, original", and Lenape, meaning "real person" or "original person". Lënu may be translated as "man". Adam DePaul, member of the unrecognized Lenape Nation of Pennsylvania, calls the name "an anglicized grammatical error that basically translates as the 'original people people'". While acknowledging that some Lenape do identify as Lenni Lenape or Delaware, DePaul says "the best word to use when referring to us is simply 'Lenape'".

When first encountered by European settlers, the Lenape were a loose association of closely related peoples who spoke similar languages and shared familial bonds in an area known as Lenapehoking, the Lenape historical territory, which spanned what is now eastern Pennsylvania, New Jersey, Lower New York Bay, and eastern Delaware.

The tribe's common name Delaware comes from the French language. English colonists named the Delaware River for the first governor of the Province of Virginia, Lord De La Warr. The British colonists began to call the Lenape the Delaware Indians because of where they lived.

Swedish colonists also settled in the area, and Swedish sources called the Lenape the Renappi.

== Historical homelands ==
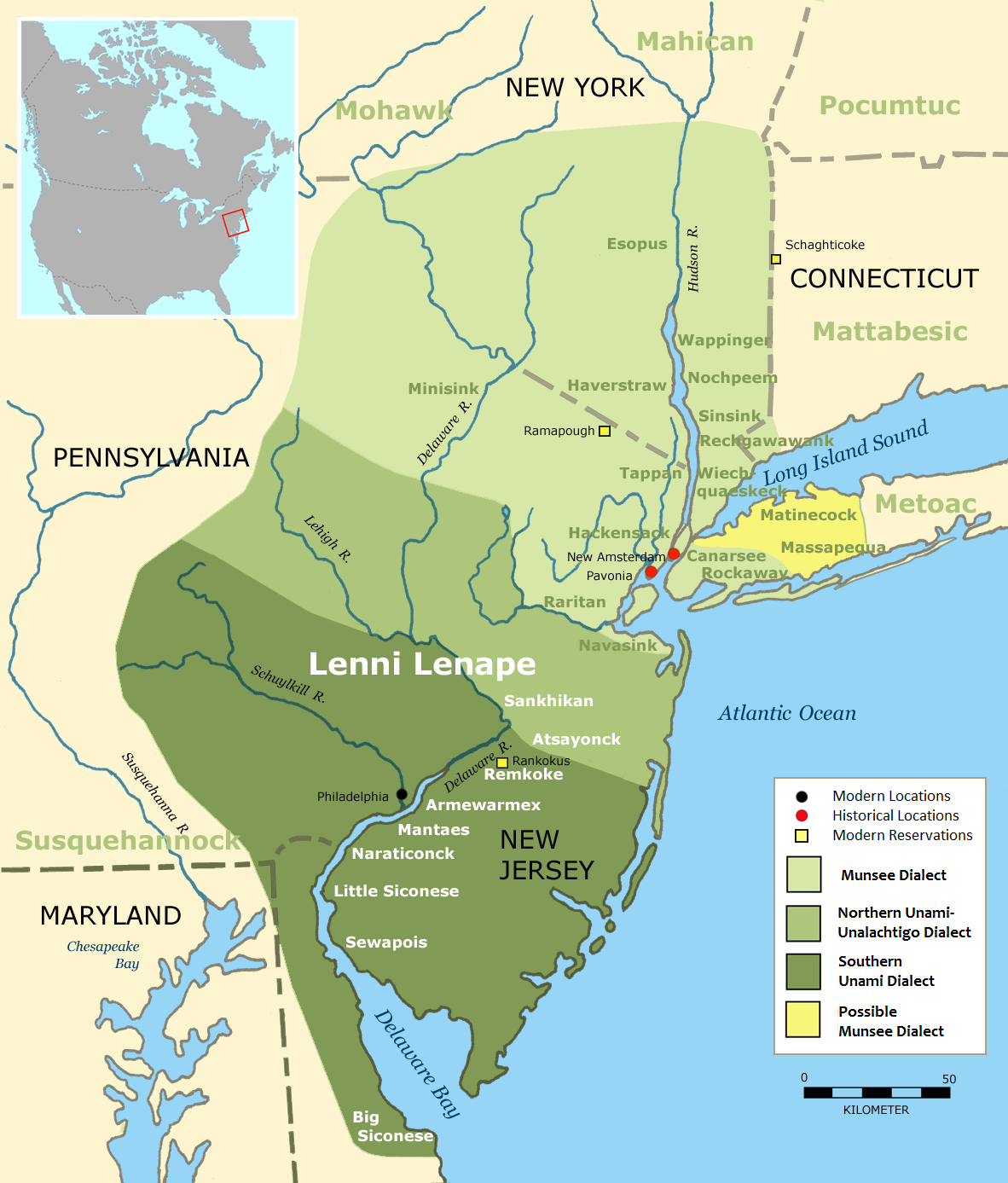
The Lenape territory, known as Lenapehoking, as of the 16th and 17th centuries, with speakers of Munsee (north), Unalachtigo (center), and Unami (south). Inset: The location of the region in the present-day United States.

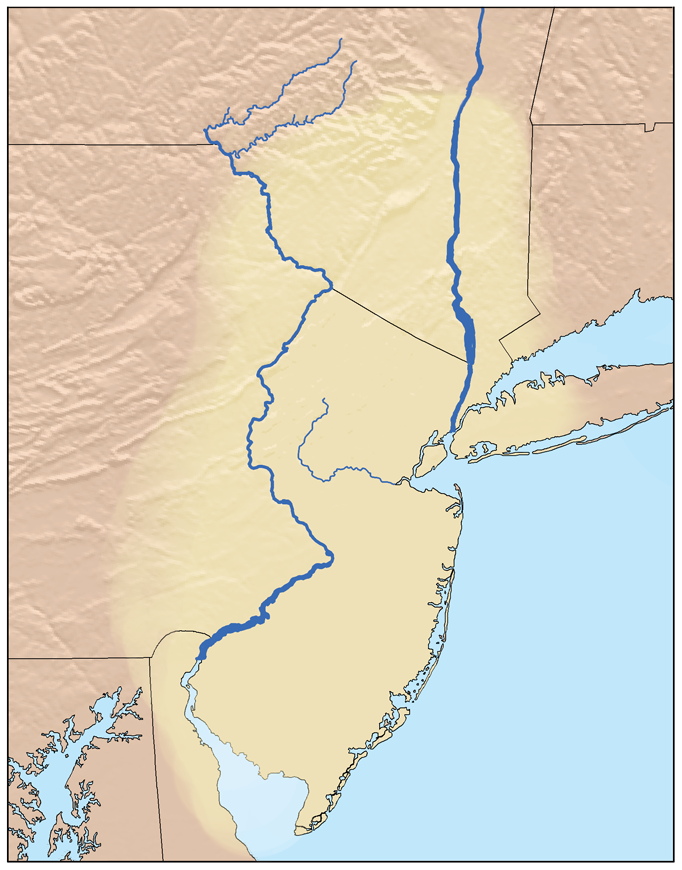
A map of Lenapehoking, comprising present-day New Jersey, southern New York, and eastern Pennsylvania, where many Lenape confederations were based in the 16th and 17th centuries

The historical Lenape country, Lenapehoking (Lënapehòkink), was a large territory that encompassed the Delaware Valley and Lehigh Valley regions of eastern Pennsylvania and New Jersey, from the north bank of the Lehigh River along the west bank of the Delaware River (then called Lenapewihittuk or Lënapei Sipu), into Delaware and the Delaware Bay. Their lands also extended west from western Long Island and New York Bay, across the Lower Hudson Valley in New York to the lower Catskills and a sliver of the upper edge of the North Branch Susquehanna River. On the west side, the Lenape lived in several small towns along the rivers and streams that fed the waterways, and likely shared the hunting territory of the Schuylkill River watershed with the rival Iroquoian Susquehannock.

Today, the Munsee-Delaware Nation has its own Indian reserve, Munsee-Delaware Nation 1, in southwest Ontario. The Delaware Nation at Moraviantown has a small, 13-square-mile (34 km^{2}) reserve in Chatham-Kent, Ontario. The Delaware of Six Nations shares the Glebe Farm 40B in Brantford, Ontario, and Six Nations Indian Reserve No. 40, shared with six Haudenosaunee peoples in Ontario.

The Stockbridge-Munsee Community has a 22,139-acre (89.59 km^{2}) Indian reservation in Wisconsin, with 16,255 acres (65.78 km^{2}) held in federal trust. The Delaware Nation has a tribal jurisdictional area in Caddo County, Oklahoma, that they share with the Caddo Nation and Wichita and Affiliated Tribes.

== Languages ==
The Unami and Munsee languages belong to the Eastern Algonquian language group and are largely mutually intelligible. Moravian missionary John Heckewelder wrote that Munsee and Unami "came out of one parent language." As of 2023, only a few Delaware First Nation elders in Moraviantown, Ontario, fluently speak Munsee.

William Penn, who first met the Lenape in 1682, said the Unami used the following words: "mother" was anna, "brother" was isseemus and "friend" was netap. He instructed his fellow English colonists: "If one asks them for anything they have not, they will answer, mattá ne hattá, which to translate is, 'not I have,' instead of 'I have not'."

The Lenape languages were once exclusively spoken languages. In 2002, the Delaware Tribe of Indians received grant money to fund The Lenape Talking Dictionary, preserving and digitizing the Southern Unami dialect.

== Society ==
=== Clans and kinship systems ===
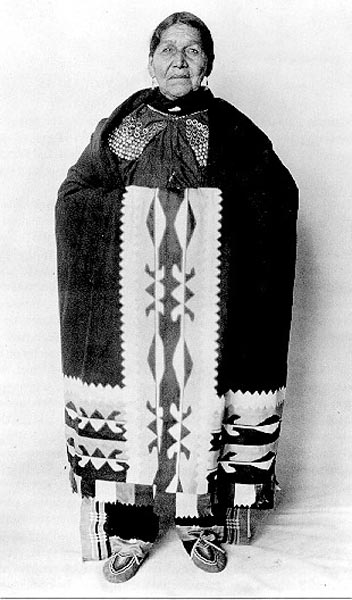
Susie Elkhair (Delaware Tribe of Indians, 1845–1925), wearing a ribbonwork shawl and Delaware dress with medallions in Oklahoma

At the time of European settlement in North America, a Lenape would have identified primarily with their immediate family and clan, friends, and village unit and, after that, with surrounding and familiar village units followed by more distant neighbors who spoke the same dialect, and finally, with those in the surrounding area who spoke mutually comprehensible languages, including the Nanticoke people who lived to their south and west in present western Delaware and eastern Maryland.

Among many Algonquian peoples along the East Coast, the Lenape were considered the grandfathers from whom other Algonquian-speaking peoples originated.

The Lenape had three clans at the end of the 17th century, each of which historically had twelve sub-clans. The three primary Lenape clans are: Wolf (Tùkwsit), Turtle (Pùkuwànku), and Turkey (Pële). The Lenape clan system is matrilineal, and historically they were a matrilocal society, that is, husbands moved into their wife's homes. Children belong to their mother's clan, from which they gain social status and identity. Within a marriage itself, men and women had relatively separate and equal rights, each controlling their own property and debts, showing further signs of a woman's power in the hierarchical structure.

Lenape villages were organized on a democratic and egalitarian basis. The local sachems held considerable authority but they had to follow their peoples’ expectations, and consulted with councils of elders.

=== Hunting, fishing, and farming ===
Lenape practiced companion planting, in which women cultivated many varieties of the Three Sisters: maize, beans, and squash. Men hunted, fished, and otherwise harvested seafood. In the 17th century, the Lenape practiced slash and burn agriculture. They used fire to manage land. Controlled use of fire extended farmlands' productivity. According to Dutch settler Isaac de Rasieres, who observed the Lenape in 1628, the Lenape planted their primary crop, maize, in March. Over time, the Lenape adapted to European methods of hunting and farming with metal tools.

The men limited their agricultural labor to clearing the field and breaking the soil. They primarily hunted and fished during the rest of the year: from September to January and from June to July, they mainly hunted deer, but from the month of January to the spring planting in May, they hunted anything from bears and beavers to raccoons and foxes. Dutch settler David de Vries, who stayed in the area from 1634 to 1644, described a Lenape hunt in the valley of the Achinigeu-hach (or Ackingsah-sack, the Hackensack River), in which 100 or more men stood in a line many paces from each other, beating thigh bones on their palms to drive animals to the river, where they could be killed easily. Other methods of hunting included lassoing and drowning deer, as well as forming a circle around prey and setting the brush on fire. They also harvested vast quantities of fish and shellfish from the bays of the area, and, in southern New Jersey, harvested clams year-round. One technique used while fishing was to add ground chestnuts to stream water to make fish dizzy and easier to catch.

The success of these methods allowed the tribe to maintain a larger population than other, nomadic hunter-gatherer peoples in North America at the time, could support. Scholars have estimated that at the time of European settlement, around much of the current New York City area alone, there may have been about 15,000 Lenape in approximately 80 settlement sites. In 1524, Lenape in canoes met Giovanni da Verrazzano, the first European explorer to enter New York Harbor.

European settlers and traders from the 17th-century colonies of New Netherland and New Sweden traded with the Lenape for agricultural products, mainly maize, in exchange for iron tools. The Lenape also arranged contacts between the Minquas or Susquehannocks and the Dutch West India Company and Swedish South Company to promote the fur trade. The Lenape were major producers of labor-intensive wampum, or shell beads, which they traditionally used for ritual purposes and as ornaments. After the Dutch arrival, they began to exchange wampum for beaver furs provided by Iroquoian-speaking Susquehannock and other Minquas. They exchanged these furs for Dutch and, from the late 1630s, also Swedish imports. Relations between some Lenape and Minqua polities briefly turned sour in the late 1620s and early 1630s, but were relatively peaceful most of the time.

=== Clothing and adornment ===
The early European settlers, especially the Dutch and Swedes, were surprised at the Lenape's skill in fashioning clothing from natural materials. In hot weather men and women wore only loin cloth and skirt respectively, while they used beaver pelts or bear skins to serve as winter mantles. Additionally, both sexes might wear buckskin leggings and moccasins in cold weather. Women would wear their hair long, usually below the hip, while men kept only a small "round crest, of about 2 inches in diameter". Deer hair, dyed a deep scarlet, as well as plumes of feathers, were favorite components of headdresses and breast ornaments for males. The Lenape also adorned themselves with various ornaments made of stone, shell, animal teeth, and claws. The women often wore headbands of dyed deer hair or wampum. They painted their skin skirts or decorated them with porcupine quills. These skirts were so elaborately appointed that, when seen from a distance, they reminded Dutch settlers of fine European lace. The winter cloaks of the women were striking, fashioned from the iridescent body feathers of wild turkeys.

=== Leisure ===
Lenni Lenape play the game of pahsaheman: a football-like hybrid, split on gender lines. More than a hundred players were grouped into gendered teams (male and female) to try getting a ball through the other team's goal posts. Men could not carry and pass the ball, only use their feet, while the women could carry, pass, or kick. If the ball was picked up by a woman, she could not be tackled by the men, although men could attempt to dislodge the ball. Women were free to tackle the men.

Another common activity was that of dance, and yet again, gender differences appear: men would dance and leap loudly, often with bear claw accessories, while women, wearing little thimbles or bells, would dance more modestly, stepping "one foot after the other slightly forwards then backwards, yet so as to advance gradually".

=== Ethnobotany ===
Lenape herbalists, who have been primarily women, use their extensive knowledge of plant life to help heal their community's ailments, sometimes through ceremony. The Lenape found uses in trees like black walnut, which were used to cure ringworm, and with persimmons which were used to cure ear problems.

The Lenape carry the nuts of Ohio buckeye (Aesculus glabra) in the pocket for rheumatism, and an infusion of ground nuts mixed with sweet oil or mutton tallow for earaches. They also grind the nuts and use them to poison fish in streams. They also apply a poultice of pulverized nuts with sweet oil for earache.

== History ==
=== European contact ===
The first recorded European contact with people presumed to have been the Lenape was in 1524. The explorer Giovanni da Verrazzano was greeted by local Lenape who came by canoe, after his ship entered what is now called Lower New York Bay.

=== Early colonial era ===
At the time of sustained European contact in the 17th through the 19th centuries, the Lenape were a powerful Native American nation who inhabited a region on the mid-Atlantic coast spanning the latitudes of southern Massachusetts to the southern extent of Delaware in what anthropologists call the Northeastern Woodlands. Although never politically unified, the confederation of the Lenape roughly encompassed the area around and between the Delaware and lower Hudson rivers, and included the western part of Long Island in present-day New York. Some of their place names, such as Manhattan ("the island of many hills"), Raritan, and Tappan were adopted by Dutch and English colonists to identify the Lenape people that lived there.

=== 17th century ===
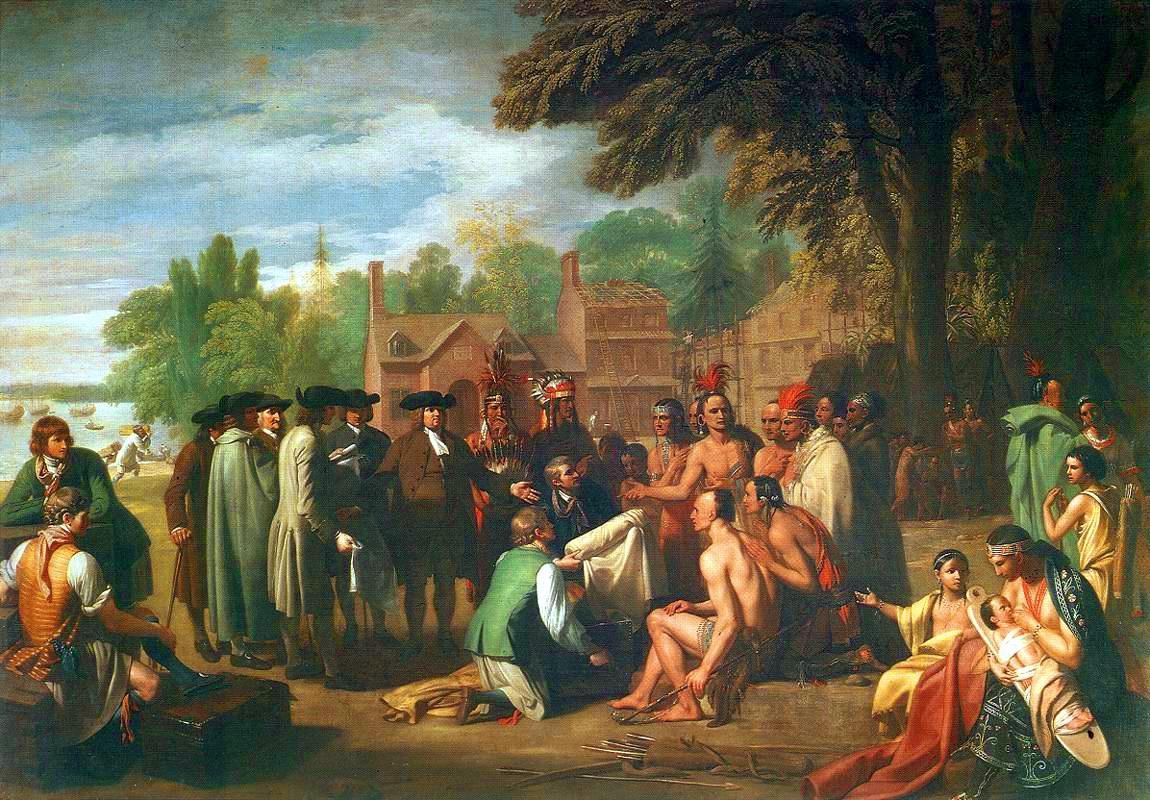
William Penn's 1682 treaty with the Lenape depicted in Penn's Treaty with the Indians, a 1771 portrait by Benjamin West

The Lenape had a culture in which the clan and family controlled property. Europeans often tried to contract for land with the tribal chiefs, confusing their culture with that of neighboring tribes such as the Haudenosaunee. As a further complication in communication and understanding, kinship terms commonly used by European settlers had very different meanings to the Lenape: "fathers" did not have the same direct parental control as in Europe, "brothers" could be a symbol of equality but could also be interpreted as one's parallel cousins, "cousins" were interpreted as only cross-cousins, etc. All of these added complexities in kinship terms made agreements with Europeans all the more difficult. The Lenape would petition for grievances on the basis that not all their families had been recognized in the transaction (not that they wanted to "share" the land). After the Dutch arrival and brief establishment of Fort Nassau (along the bank of the Delaware River in present-day Gloucester City, New Jersey) in the 1620s, the Lenape were successful in restricting Dutch settlement until the 1660s to no further than Pavonia in present-day Jersey City along the Hudson. The Dutch finally established a garrison at Bergen, which allowed settlement west of the Hudson within the province of New Netherland. This land was purchased from the Lenape after the fact. Indeed, Dutch - Lenape relations focused on trading relations.

New Amsterdam was founded in 1624 by the Dutch in what would later become New York City. Dutch settlers also founded a colony at present-day Lewes, Delaware, on June 3, 1631, and named it Zwaanendael (Swan Valley). The colony had a short life, as in 1632 a local band of Lenape killed the 32 Dutch settlers after a misunderstanding escalated over Lenape defacement of the insignia of the governing Dutch West India Company. The Lenape's quick adoption of trade goods, and their desire to trap furs to meet high European demand, resulted in over-harvesting the beaver population in the lower Hudson Valley. With the fur sources exhausted, the Dutch shifted their operations to present-day upstate New York. The Lenape who produced wampum in the vicinity of Manhattan Island temporarily forestalled the negative effects of the decline in trade.

During the resulting Beaver Wars in the first half of the 17th century, European colonists were careful to keep firearms from the coastally located Lenape, while rival Iroquoian peoples in the north and west such as the Susquehannock and Haudenosaunee became comparatively well-armed. The Haudenosaunee, along with European settlers, played a major role in the displacement of the Lenape from their traditional territory.They defeated the Lenape, and some scholars believe that the Lenape may have become tributaries to the Susquehannock. After the warfare, the Lenape referred to the Susquehannock as "uncles". The Haudenosaunee Confederacy added the Lenape to the Covenant Chain in 1676 and the Lenape were tributary to the Confederation until 1753, shortly before the outbreak of the French and Indian War (a part of the Seven Years' War in Europe).

The historical record of the mid-17th century suggests that most Lenape polities each consisted of several hundred people but it is conceivable that some had been considerably larger prior to close contact, given the wars with the Susquehannock and the Haudenosaunee, both of whom were armed by the Dutch fur traders, while the Lenape were at odds with the Dutch and so lost that particular arms race. In 1648, the Axion band of Lenape were the largest tribe on the Delaware River, with 200 warriors. Epidemics of newly introduced European infectious diseases, such as smallpox, measles, cholera, influenza, and dysentery, further reduced the populations of Lenape. They and other Native peoples had no natural immunity. Recurrent violent conflicts with Europeans, such as Kieft's War (1643-1645), also devastated Lenape populations.

In 1682, William Penn and Quaker colonists created the English colony of Pennsylvania beginning at the lower Delaware River. A peace treaty was negotiated between the newly arriving colonists and Lenape at what is now known as Penn Treaty Park. In the decades immediately following, some 20,000 new colonists arrived in the region, putting pressure on Lenape settlements and hunting grounds. Penn expected his authority and that of the colonial Province of Pennsylvania government to take precedence.

=== 18th century ===
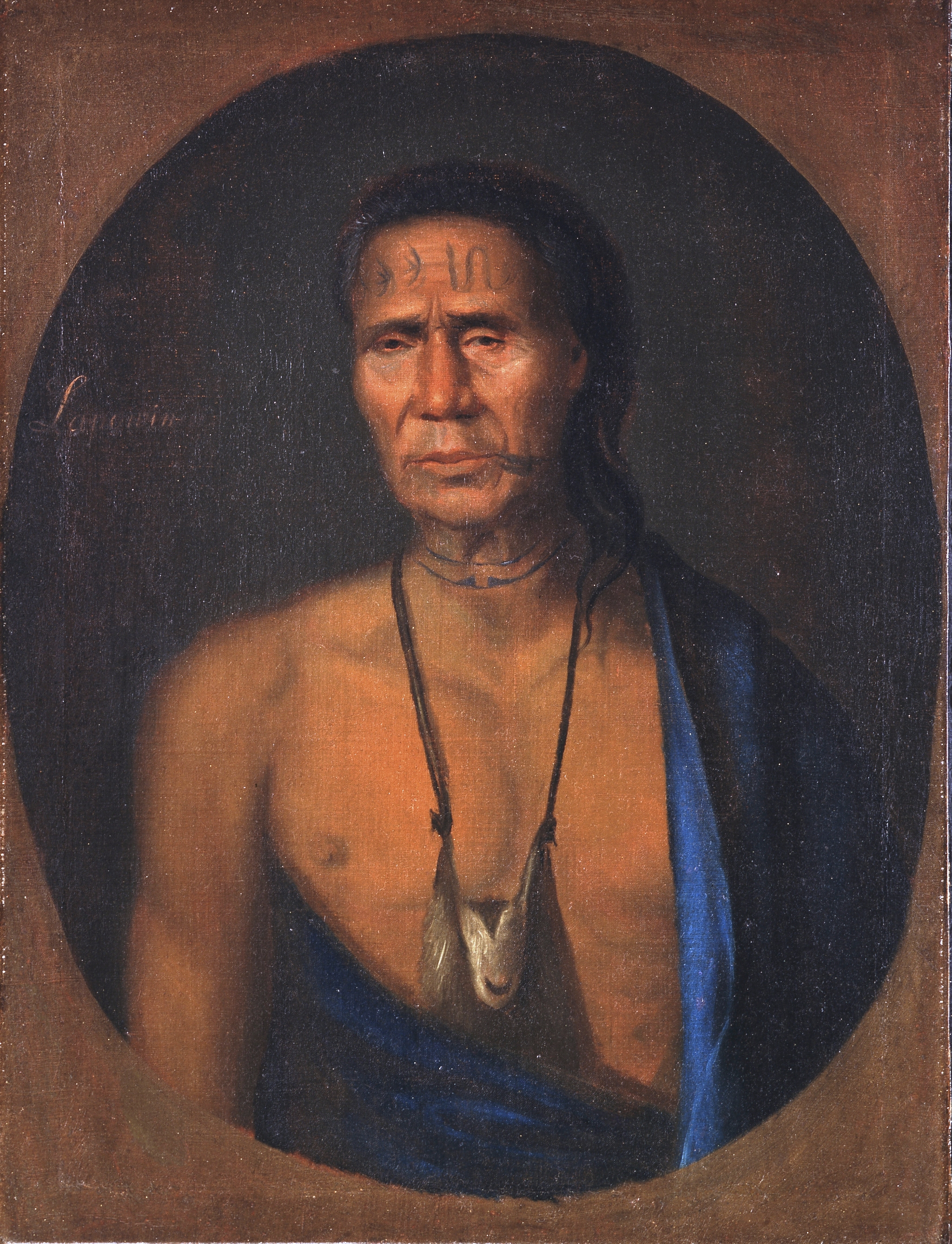
Lenape chief Lappawinsoe depicted in a 1735 portrait by Gustavus Hesselius

William Penn died in 1718. His heirs, John and Thomas Penn, and their agents were ruling the colony, and had abandoned many of William Penn's practices. In an attempt to raise money, they contemplated ways to sell Lenape land to colonial settlers, which culminated in the Walking Purchase. In the mid-1730s, colonial administrators produced a draft of a land deed dating to the 1680s. William Penn had approached several leaders of Lenape polities in the lower Delaware to discuss land sales further north. Since the land in question did not belong to their polities, the talks did not lead to an agreement. But colonial administrators prepared the draft that resurfaced in the 1730s. The Penns and their supporters presented this draft as a legitimate deed, but Lenape leaders in the lower Delaware refused to accept it.

According to historian Steven C. Harper, what followed was a "convoluted sequence of deception, fraud, and extortion orchestrated by the Pennsylvania government that is commonly known as the Walking Purchase". In the end, all Lenape who still lived on the Delaware were driven off the remnants of their homeland under threats of violence. Some Lenape polities eventually retaliated by attacking Pennsylvania settlements. When they resisted European colonial expansion at the height of the French and Indian War, British colonial authorities investigated the causes of Lenape resentment. The British asked Sir William Johnson, Superintendent of Indian Affairs, to lead the investigation. Johnson had become wealthy as a trader and acquired thousands of acres of land in the Mohawk River region from the Haudenosaunee Mohawk of New York.

In 1757, an organization known as the New Jersey Association for Helping the Indians wrote a constitution to expel native Munsee Lenape from their settlements in the area of present-day Washington Valley in Morris County, New Jersey. Led by Reverend John Brainerd, colonists forcefully relocated 200 people to Indian Mills, then known as Brotherton, an industrial town with gristills and sawmills, that was the first Native American reservation in New Jersey. Reverend John Brainerd abandoned the reservation in 1777.

In 1758, the Treaty of Easton was signed between the Lenape and European colonists. In it, the Lenape were required to move westward out of present-day New York and New Jersey, progressing into Pennsylvania and then to present-day Ohio and beyond. Through the 18th century, many Lenape moved west into the relatively depopulated upper Ohio River basin, but they also sporadically launched violent raids on settlers far outside the area.

Beginning in the 18th century, the Moravian Church established missions in Lenape settlements. The Moravians required the Christian converts to share Moravian pacifism and live in a structured and European-style mission village. Moravian pacifism and unwillingness to take loyalty oaths caused conflicts with British colonial authorities, who were seeking aid against the French and their Native American allies in the French and Indian War. The Moravians' insistence on Christian Lenape's abandoning traditional warfare practices alienated mission populations from other Lenape and Native American groups, who revered warriors.

Other Lenape initially sided with France, since they hoped to prevent further European colonial encroachment in their settlements. Their chiefs Teedyuscung in the east and Tamaqua near present-day Pittsburgh shifted to building alliances with British colonial authorities. Lenape leader Killbuck (Bemino) assisted the British against the French and their Indian allies. In 1761, Killbuck led a British supply train from Fort Pitt to Fort Sandusky. In 1763, Bill Hickman, a Lenape, warned English colonists in the Juniata River region of present-day Pennsylvania of an impending attack.

After the end of the French and Indian War, European settlers continued to attack the Lenape, often to such an extent that, as historian Amy Schutt writes, the dead since the wars outnumbered those killed during the war. In April 1763, Teedyuscung was killed during the burning of his home. His son Captain Bull responded by attacking settlers, sponsored by the Susquehanna Company, in the present-day Wyoming Valley region of Pennsylvania. Many Lenape joined in Pontiac's War and were among the Native Americans who besieged present-day Pittsburgh that same year.

==== American Revolutionary War ====
During the early 1770s, missionaries, including David Zeisberger and John Heckewelder, arrived in the Ohio Country near the Lenape villages. The Moravian Church sent these men to convert the Indigenous peoples to Christianity. They established several missions, including Gnadenhutten, Lichtenau, and Schoenbrunn. The missionaries pressured Indigenous people to assimilate to European social mores, beliefs, and ways of life, and to replace them with European and Christian ways. Many Lenape did adopt Christianity, but others refused to do so. The Lenape became a divided people during the 1770s, including in Killbuck's family. Killbuck resented his grandfather for allowing the Moravians to remain in the Ohio country. The Moravians believed in pacifism, and Killbuck believed that every convert to the Moravians deprived the Lenape of a warrior to stop further white settlement of their land.

In the beginning of the American Revolutionary War, Killbuck and many Lenape claimed to be neutral. Other neighboring Indian communities, particularly the Wyandot, the Mingo, the Shawnee, and the Wolf Clan of the Lenape, favored the British. They believed that by the Royal Proclamation of 1763, restricting Anglo-American settlement to east of the Appalachian Mountains, the British would help them preserve a Native American territory.

As the American Revolutionary War intensified, the Lenape in present-day Ohio were deeply divided over which side, if any, to take in the war. When the war began, Killbuck found the Lenape caught between the British and their Indian allies in the West and the Americans in the East. The Lenape settled many smaller villages around their main village of Coshocton, between the western frontier strongholds of the British and the Patriots. The Americans had Fort Pitt (present-day Pittsburgh) and the British, along with Indian allies, controlled the area of Fort Detroit across the river in present-day Michigan.

Some Lenape fought against the American settlers and moved west, closer to Detroit, where they settled on the Scioto and Sandusky rivers. In 1778, Killbuck permitted American soldiers to traverse Lenape territory so that the soldiers could attack British-held Fort Detroit. In return, Killbuck requested that the Americans build a fort near the major Lenape village of Coshocton, to provide them with protection from potential attacks by British-allied Indians and Loyalists. The Americans agreed and built Fort Laurens, which they garrisoned. Lenape sympathetic to the United States remained at Coshocton, and Lenape leaders signed the Treaty of Fort Pitt (1778) with the Americans. Through this treaty, the Lenape hoped to establish the Ohio country as a state inhabited exclusively by Native Americans, as a subset of the new United States. A third group of Lenape, many of them converted Christian Munsees, lived in several mission villages run by Moravian missionaries. Like the other bands, they also spoke the Munsee branch of Lenape, an Algonquian language.

The British made plans to attack Fort Laurens in early 1779 and demanded that the neutral Lenape formally side with the British. Killbuck warned the Americans of the planned attack. His actions helped save the fort, but the Americans abandoned it just months later in August 1779. The Lenape had lost their protectors and found themselves without solid allies in the conflict, which compounded their dispossession at the hand of encroaching American pioneers during and after the war.

White Eyes, the Lenape chief who had negotiated the Fort Pitt treaty, died in 1778. Subsequently, many Lenape at Coshocton eventually joined the war against the Americans. In response, American military officer Daniel Brodhead led an expedition out of Fort Pitt and on April 20, Brodhead and his men, including some U.S.-aligned Lenape, raided and destroyed the pacifist Moravian Christian Lenape settlement of Indaochaic also known as Lichtenau. Then the troop, aided by Lenape chief Gelelemend, traveled to the nearby village of Goschachgunk, now known as Coshocton, Ohio. He divided his men into three regiments and laid their village to waste. On the first night, 16 warriors were captured, taken south of the village, and slaughtered; another 20 were killed in battle, and 20 civilians were taken prisoner. Surviving residents fled to the north. Colonel Brodhead convinced the militia to leave the Lenape at the remaining Moravian mission villages unmolested, since they were unarmed non-combatants.

==== Late 18th century treaties ====
In 1780, Munsee-speaking Lenape community leaders native to the Washington Valley that had been forcibly displaced to Brotherton, wrote a "community treaty" to oppose selling any more land to white settlers:

Be it known by this, that it has been in our consideration of late about settling of White People on the Indian Lands, And we have concluded that it is a thing which ought not to be, & a thing that will not be allowed by us, that of Renting or giving Leases for said Lands, hereafter, no, not by the proprietors themselves without the consent of the rest much more by those who has no Claim or Rite here ...

We have come upon those resolutions we hope for our better living in friendship among one another, it may be that there is some which does not like white people for their Neighbours, for fear of their not agreeing as they ought to do. it might be about there children or about something they have about them we know not what, Again it may be the white Man may do something either upon Land, Timber or something else which some one of the proprietors would not like & from thence would come great deal of Disquietness, & many other ways which may plainly be seen into, by those that have any sense or reason—

We are exceeding glad when we see we are like to live in Quietness among one another without giving any offence to one another, & this of keeping white people from among us will be a great step towards it, & for this reason we intend to stand by or rather stand Hand in hand against any coming on the Indian Lands.

— Joseph Micty, Bartholomew Calvin, Jacob Skekit, Robert Skikkit, Derrick Quaquiuse, Benjamin Nicholus, Mary Calvin, Hezekiah Calvin

Over a period of 176 years, European settlers pushed the Lenape out of the East Coast, through to Ohio and eventually further west. Most members of the Munsee-language branch of the Lenape left the United States after the British were defeated in the American Revolutionary War. Their descendants live on three Indian reserves in Western Ontario, Canada. They are descendants of those Lenape of Ohio Country who sided with the British during the Revolutionary War. The largest reserve is at Moraviantown, Ontario, where the Turtle Phratry settled in 1792 following the war.

The 1795 Treaty of Greenville saw the cession of more Indigenous lands to the United States government. In return, the U.S. relinquished its claims to "all other Indian lands northward of the river Ohio, eastward of the Mississippi, and westward and southward of the Great Lakes and the waters uniting them". The U.S. also agreed to provide an annual allowance to various Indigenous groups including the Lenape.

In 1796, the Oneidas of New Stockbridge invited the Munsee Lenape to their reservation. The initial Lenape response was negative; in 1798, Lenape community leaders Bartholomew Calvin, Jason Skekit, and 18 others signed a public statement of refusal to leave "our fine place in Jersey". The Munsee later agreed to relocate to New Stockbridge to join the Oneidas. A few households stayed behind to assimilate into New Jersey.

=== 19th century ===
In the early 19th century the amateur anthropologist Silas Wood published a book claiming that there were several American Indian tribes that were distinct to Long Island, New York. He collectively called them the Metoac. Wood (and earlier settlers) often misinterpreted the Indian use of place names for autonyms. Modern scientific scholarship has shown that in fact two linguistic groups representing two distinct Algonquian cultural identities lived on the island, not "13 individual tribes" as asserted by Wood. The bands to the west were Lenape. Those to the east were more related culturally to the Algonquian tribes of New England across Long Island Sound, such as the Pequot.

Two groups migrated to Oneida County, New York, by 1802, the Brotherton Indians of New Jersey and the Stockbridge-Munsee. In 1822, the Munsee Lenape of Washington Valley who had moved to Stockbridge were forcefully displaced by white colonists again, over 900 miles' travel away, to Green Bay, Wisconsin.

==== Indiana to Missouri ====
By the Treaty of St. Mary's, signed October 3, 1818, in St. Mary's, Ohio, the Lenape ceded their lands in Indiana for lands west of the Mississippi and an annuity of $4,000. Over the next few years, the Lenape settled on the James River in Missouri near its confluence with Wilsons Creek, occupying eventually about 40,000 acres (160 km^{2}) of the approximately 2,000,000 acres (8,100 km^{2}) allotted to them. Anderson, Indiana, is named after Chief William Anderson (Kikthawenund), whose father was Swedish. The Lenape village in Indiana was called Anderson's Town, while the Lenape village in Missouri on the James River was often called Anderson's Village. The tribes' cabins and cornfields were spread out along the James River and Wilsons Creek.

==== Role in western history ====
Many Lenape participated in the exploration of the western United States, working as trappers with the mountain men, and as guides and hunters for wagon trains. They served as army guides and scouts in events such as the Second Seminole War, Frémont's expeditions, and the conquest of California during the Mexican–American War. Occasionally, they played surprising roles as Indian allies.

Sagundai accompanied one of Frémont's expeditions as one of his Lenape guides. From California, Fremont needed to communicate with Senator Benton. Sagundai volunteered to carry the message through some 2,200 kilometres (1367 miles) of hostile territory. He took many scalps in this adventure, including that of a Comanche with a particularly fine horse, who had outrun both Sagundai and the other Comanche. Sagundai was thrown when his horse stepped into a prairie-dog hole, but avoided the Comanche's lance, shot the warrior dead, and caught his horse and escaped the other Comanche. When Sagundai returned to his own people in present-day Kansas, they celebrated his exploits with the last war and scalp dances of their history, which were held at Edwardsville, Kansas.

==== Texas ====
===== Spanish Texas =====
The Lenape migrated into Texas in the late 18th and early 19th centuries. Elements of the Lenape migrated from Missouri into Texas around 1820, settling around the Red River and Sabine River. The Lenape were peaceful and shared their territory in Spanish Texas with the Caddo and other immigrating bands, as well as with the Spanish and ever-increasing American population. This peaceful trend continued after Mexico won their independence from Spain in 1821.

===== Mexican Texas =====
In 1828, Mexican General Manuel de Mier y Terán made an inspection of eastern Mexican Texas and estimated that the region housed between 150 and 200 Lenape families. The Lenape requested Mier y Terán to issue them land grants and send teachers, so they might learn to read and write the Spanish language. The general, impressed with how well they had adapted to the Mexican culture, sent their request to Mexico City, but the authorities never granted the Lenape any legal titles.

The situation changed when the Texas Revolution began in 1835. Texas officials were eager to gain the support of the Texas tribes to their side and offered to recognize their land claims by sending three commissioners to negotiate a treaty. A treaty was agreed upon in February 1836 that mapped the boundaries of Indian lands, but this agreement was never officially ratified by the Texas government.

===== Texas Republic =====
The Lenape remained friendly after Texas won its independence. Republic of Texas President Sam Houston favored a policy of peaceful relations with all tribes. He sought the services of the friendly Lenape, and in 1837, enlisted several Lenape to protect the frontier from hostile western tribes. Lenape scouts joined with Texas Rangers as they patrolled the western frontier. Houston also tried to get the Lenape land claims recognized, but his efforts were met only by opposition.

The next Texan President, Mirabeau B. Lamar, completely opposed all Indians. He considered them illegal intruders who threatened the settlers' safety and lands and issued an order for their removal from Texas. The Lenape were sent north of the Red River into Indian Territory, although a few scattered Lenape remained in Texas.

In 1841, Houston was reelected to a second term as president and his peaceful Indian policy was then reinstated. A treaty with the remaining Lenape and a few other tribes was negotiated in 1843 at Fort Bird and the Lenape were enlisted to help him make peace with the Comanche. Lenape scouts and their families were allowed to settle along the Brazos and Bosque rivers in order to influence the Comanche to come to the Texas government for a peace conference. The plan was successful and the Lenape helped bring the Comanches to a treaty council in 1844.

===== State of Texas =====
In 1845, the Republic of Texas agreed to annexation by the US to become an American state. The Lenape continued their peaceful policy with the Americans and served as interpreters, scouts, and diplomats for the US Army and the Indian Bureau. In 1847, John Meusebach was assisted by Jim Shaw (a Lenape), in settling the German communities in the Texas Hill Country. For the remainder of his life, Shaw worked as a military scout in West Texas. In 1848, John Conner (Lenape) guided the Chihuahua-El Paso Expedition and was granted a league of land by a special act of the Texas legislature in 1853. The expeditions of the map maker Randolph B. Marcy through West Texas in 1849, 1852, and 1854 were guided by Black Beaver (Lenape).

In 1854, despite the history of peaceful relations, the last of the Texas Lenape were moved by the American government to the Brazos Indian Reservation near Graham, Texas. In 1859 the US forced the remaining Lenape to remove from Texas to a location on the Washita River in the vicinity of present Anadarko, Oklahoma.

==== Kansas reservation ====
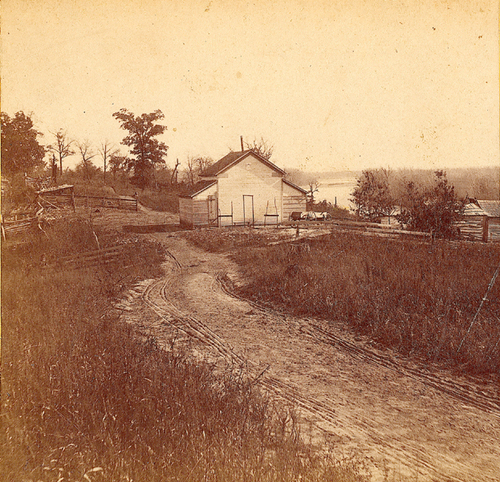
A Lenape farm on a Delaware Indian Reservation in Kansas in 1867

Under the terms of the Treaty of the James Fork that was signed on September 24, 1829, and ratified by the U.S. Senate in 1830, the Lenape were forced to move further west. They were granted lands in Indian Territory in exchange for lands on the James Fork of the White River in Missouri. These lands, in what is now Kansas, were west of the Missouri and north of the Kansas River. The main reserve consisted of about 1,000,000 acres (4,000 km^{2}) with an additional "outlet" strip 10 miles (16 km) wide extending to the west.

In 1854, the U.S. Congress passed the Kansas–Nebraska Act, which created the Territory of Kansas and opened the area for white settlement. It also authorized negotiation with Indian tribes regarding removal. The Lenape were reluctant to negotiate for yet another relocation, but they feared serious trouble with white settlers, and conflict developed.

As the Lenape were not considered United States citizens, they had no access to the courts and no way to enforce their property rights. The United States Army was to enforce their rights to reservation land after the Indian Agent had both posted a public notice warning trespassers and served written notice on them, a process generally considered onerous. Major B.F. Robinson, the Indian Agent appointed in 1855, did his best, but could not control the hundreds of white trespassers who stole stock, cut timber, and built houses and squatted on Lenape lands. By 1860, the Lenape had reached consensus to leave Kansas, which was in accord with the government's Indian removal policy.

==== Oklahoma ====
The main body of Lenape arrived in Indian Territory in the 1860s. The two federally recognized tribes of Lenape in Oklahoma are the Delaware Nation, headquartered in Anadarko, Oklahoma, and the Delaware Tribe of Indians, headquartered in Bartlesville, Oklahoma.

The Delaware Tribe of Indians were required to purchase land from the reservation of the Cherokee Nation; they made two payments totaling $438,000. A court dispute followed over whether the sale included rights for the Lenape as citizens within the Cherokee Nation. While the dispute was unsettled, the Curtis Act of 1898 dissolved tribal governments and ordered the allotment of communal tribal lands to individual households of members of tribes. After the lands were allotted in 160-acre (650,000 m^{2}) lots to tribal members in 1907, the government sold surplus land to non-Indians.

=== 20th century ===
In 1979, the United States Bureau of Indian Affairs revoked the tribal status of the Lenape living among Cherokee in Oklahoma. They began to count the Lenape as Cherokee. The Lenape had this decision overturned in 1996, when they were recognized by the federal government as a separate tribal nation.

=== 21st century ===
The Cherokee Nation filed suit to overturn the independent federal recognition of the Lenape. The tribe lost federal recognition in a 2004 court ruling in favor of the Cherokee Nation but regained it on July 28, 2009. After recognition, the tribe reorganized under the Oklahoma Indian Welfare Act. Members approved a constitution and by laws in a May 26, 2009, vote. Jerry Douglas was elected as tribal chief.

In September 2000, the Delaware Nation of Oklahoma received 11.5 acres (4.7 ha) of land in Thornbury Township, Delaware County, Pennsylvania.

In 2004, the Delaware Nation filed suit against Pennsylvania in the United States District Court for the Eastern District of Pennsylvania, seeking to reclaim 315 acres (1.27 km^{2}) included in the 1737 Walking Purchase to build a casino. In the suit titled The Delaware Nation v. Commonwealth of Pennsylvania, the plaintiffs, acting as the successor in interest and political continuation of the Lenni Lenape and of Lenape Chief Moses Tunda Tatamy, claimed aboriginal and fee title to the 315 acres of land located in Forks Township in Northampton County, near the town of Tatamy, Pennsylvania. After the Walking Purchase, Chief Tatamy was granted legal permission for him and his family to remain on this parcel of land, known as "Tatamy's Place". In addition to suing the state, the tribe also sued the township, the county and elected officials, including Gov. Ed Rendell.

The court held that the justness of the extinguishment of aboriginal title is nonjusticiable, including in the case of fraud. Because the extinguishment occurred prior to the passage of the first Indian Nonintercourse Act in 1790, that Act did not avail the Lenape. As a result, the court granted the Commonwealth's motion to dismiss. In its conclusion the court stated: "... we find that the Delaware Nation's aboriginal rights to Tatamy's Place were extinguished in 1737 and that, later, fee title to the land was granted to Chief Tatamy—not to the tribe as a collectivity."

Not every Lenape now lives in Oklahoma. Many live in the Northeast, and some Munsee Lenape are applying for state recognition.

== Contemporary tribes and organizations ==
=== U.S. federally recognized tribes ===
Three Lenape tribes are federally recognized in the United States:

- Delaware Nation in Anadarko, Oklahoma
- Delaware Tribe of Indians in Bartlesville, Oklahoma
- Stockbridge-Munsee Community in Bowler, Wisconsin.

=== Canadian First Nations ===
The Lenape who fled United States in the late 18th century settled in what is now Ontario. Canada recognizes three Lenape First Nations with four Indian reserves. Each is located in Southwestern Ontario:

- Munsee-Delaware Nation, Canadian reserve near St. Thomas, Ontario
- Moravian of the Thames First Nation, Canadian reserve near Chatham-Kent
- Delaware of Six Nations (at Six Nations of the Grand River), two Canadian reserves near Brantford, Ontario

=== State-recognized and unrecognized groups ===
Four groups who claim descent from Lenape people are state-recognized tribes:

- Lenape Indian Tribe of Delaware in Delaware
- Lenape Nation of Pennsylvania in Pennsylvania
- Nanticoke Indian Association in Delaware
- Nanticoke-Lenni Lenape Tribal Nation in New Jersey
- Ramapough Lenape Nation in New Jersey
- Powhatan Renape Nation in New Jersey

More than a dozen organizations in Delaware, Maryland, New Jersey, Pennsylvania, Virginia, and elsewhere claim descent from Lenape people and are unrecognized tribes. Organizations in Pennsylvania, Idaho, and Kansas have petitioned the U.S. federal government for recognition. One of these includes the Lenape Nation of Pennsylvania based in Easton, Pennsylvania.

The federally recognized Delaware Nation regards all state-recognized Lenape tribes and Lenape heritage groups as fraudulent organizations, as they have stated they "do not acknowledge or work with any non-federally recognized groups that claim Lenape identity or nationhood, which includes 'state recognized' groups as we do not agree with state recognition." In a 2023 report, the Delaware Nation referred to these organizations as CPAINs (Corporations Posing as Indigenous Nations), stating that "If a 'pretendian' is an individual who falsely claims indigenous lineage, then CPAIN is what happens when a group of 'pretendians' decide to form a corporation, usually a non-profit, and pass it off to the public as a tribe."

The federally recognized Delaware Tribe of Indians has issued a resolution which "denounces fabricated Delaware groups and commits to exposing and assisting state and federal authorities in eradicating any group which attempts or claims to operate as a government of the Delaware people". The resolution refers to Lenape heritage groups and state-recognized tribes in Delaware, New Jersey, New York, and Pennsylvania as CPAINs.

== Notable historical Lenape people ==
This includes only Lenape documented in history. Contemporary notable Lenape people are listed in the articles for the appropriate tribe.

- Richard C. Adams (1864–1921), Lenape author of collections of traditional narratives, legal advocate for Lenape in Washington, D.C.
- Black Beaver (1806–1880), trapper, trader and scout; first inductee into the American Indian Hall of Fame
- Buckongahelas (c. 1720–1805), Wolf clan war leader
- Custaloga (died after 1775), Wolf clan leader
- Nora Thompson Dean (Delaware Tribe of Indians, 1907–1984), linguist
- Hannah Freeman (1731–1802), purportedly the last surviving Lenape in Chester County, Pennsylvania
- Charles Journeycake (1817–1894), chief of the Wolf clan from 1855 and principal chief from 1861; visited Washington, D.C., 24 times on his tribe's behalf
- Kikthawenund (Chief William Anderson) (c. 1740 or 1750 – 1831), chief of the Turkey clan and signatory of the Treaty of Greenville and the Treaty of St. Mary's
- Sachem Killbuck (Gelelemend), Turtle clan leader
- Captain Jacobs (died 1756), war chief
- Neolin (18th century), Lenape prophet
- Chief Newcomer (Netawatwees, c. 1686–1776), founder the village of Gekelmukpechunk (Newcomerstown), Ohio in the 1760s
- Oratam (16th century), sachem of the Hackensack
- Captain Pipe (Hopocan), (c. 1725–c. 1818), 18th century chief and member of the Wolf Clan
- Pisquetomen (died 1762), chief who assisted Christian Frederick Post in negotiating the Treaty of Easton in 1758
- Sassoonan or Allumapees (c. 1675–1747), 18th century chief and member of the Turtle clan
- Shingas (fl. 1740–1763), Turkey clan war leader
- Tamanend (c. 1625–c. 1701), leader reported to have negotiated treaty with William Penn, and for whom Tammany Hall was named
- Tamaqua (died c. 1770), chief who led peace negotiations following Pontiac's War for whom Tamaqua, Pennsylvania is named
- Teedyuscung (1700–1763), leader of the eastern Lenape
- Turtleheart, chief and warrior who represented the Lenape at the Treaty of Fort Stanwix in 1768
- White Eyes (c. 1730–1778), Turtle clan peace chief who negotiated the Treaty of Fort Pitt

== See also ==
- Burial Ridge
- Esopus people
- Hell Town, Ohio (Lenape settlement in Ohio)
- Lenape mythology
- Lenape settlements
- Mohicans
- Munsee
- Native American tribes in Maryland
- Okehocking people
- Ramapough Mountain Indians
- Shamokin
- Unalachtigo Lenape
- Walking Purchase
- Wappinger
