= Christian Fast =

Cover of The Adventure of Christian Fast.

Christian Fast (1762–1841) was born in Maryland, the youngest son of German immigrants, Johann Nicklaus Fast and Cadarina Dörner, who were from Göcklingen, Germany (Nicklaus) and Ilbesheim, Germany (Cadarina), although he spent much of his youth in Pennsylvania/Virginia. He joined the Virginia Militia in 1780, as a substitute for his brother Jacob, and helped man a local fort for a short while. In mid-1781 he joined the Pennsylvania Militia, soon becoming part of an expedition headed by General George Rogers Clark (the older brother of William Clark, of Lewis & Clark fame), under the direct command of Colonel Archibald Lochry. The purpose of the expedition was to capture Fort Detroit, while subduing some of the intervening Native American tribes who had sided with the British. Christian, however, along with many of his fellows, was very soon captured by the Delaware Indians in an engagement usually referred to as "Lochry's Defeat".

Large numbers of the prisoners were killed after capture, but Christian, who was wounded during the fight, was given the personal protection of a Delaware warrior of some fame, Tom Lyons, who admired the young Fast's courage. Lyons was especially entertained by his ability to walk on his hands, something he had not seen before. In fact, Christian was adopted into the Delaware tribe, complete with appropriate grooming and attire. As an "Indian" he met some notable historical individuals: the Delaware chief, Captain Pipe, as well as Simon Girty, a much-hated American who now sided with the Indians and the British.

Christian Fast's life as a Delaware lasted about a year, but when it became clear that his own home area was about to fall under their attack, he escaped and returned in time to warn his relatives and others in the vicinity. He eventually lived out his relatively long life in Ohio among some of the same Lenape he had known during the war.

Fast's experiences were later adapted into a historical fiction novel for young readers by author Don Oakley.
