= Girty =

Girty or Girtys may refer to:

== People ==
- George Herbert Girty (1869–1939), American paleontologist
- Simon Girty (1741–1818), American colonial
- James Girty (1743–1817), Colonial interpreter and trader

== Other ==
- Girty Run, a stream in West Virginia
- Girtys Run, a tributary of the Allegheny River in Pennsylvania
