= Laughery Island =

Island in Boone County, Kentucky, United States

Coordinates: 38°59′37.32″N 84°50′25.80″W

Laughery Island, also called Laughery's Island, is a privately owned alluvial island in the Ohio River in Boone County, Kentucky. The island is named after Archibald Lochry, the leader of an ill-fated group of Pennsylvania militiamen who were attacked near the island by Native Americans in 1781 during the American Revolutionary War, a battle known as Lochry's Defeat.
