= Versailles State Park =

State park in Ripley County, Indiana

- IUCN category V (protected landscape/seascape)
- Location within Indiana
- Location: Indiana, United States
- Nearest city: Versailles, Indiana
- Coordinates: 39.08°N 85.23°W
- Area: 5,988 acres (24 km^{2})
- Established: 1943
- Visitors: 224,526 (in 2018–2019)
- Governing body: Indiana Department of Natural Resources
- Website: Official website

Versailles State Park (pronounced locally as ver-SAYLES) is an Indiana state park, near the town of Versailles, Indiana in Ripley County. The land was given by the National Park Service for use as a state park to Indiana's Department of Conservation in 1943. The park draws about 225,000 visitors annually.

In the early 20th century, the area was farmland. In the 1930s, the National Park Service acquired the land and hired the Civilian Conservation Corps (CCC) to improve the land into a Recreational Demonstration Area. The 230-acre (0.93 km^{2}) Versailles Lake was formed in 1954 when a dam was built across Laughery Creek.

Near the park's entrance is a statue commemorating the work done by the CCC to improve the land. Efforts to build the statue were led by two local women, Ruth Swinney and her daughter Lisa Ebinger, as well as the Ripley County Historical Society. Two grants--one from the Rising Sun Regional Foundation and another from the Ripley County Community Foundation--provided the funds necessary to construct the statue. The statue was dedicated on May 21, 2010. Similar statues exist across the United States, but the only other such statue in Indiana is located in Ouabache State Park in Wells County.

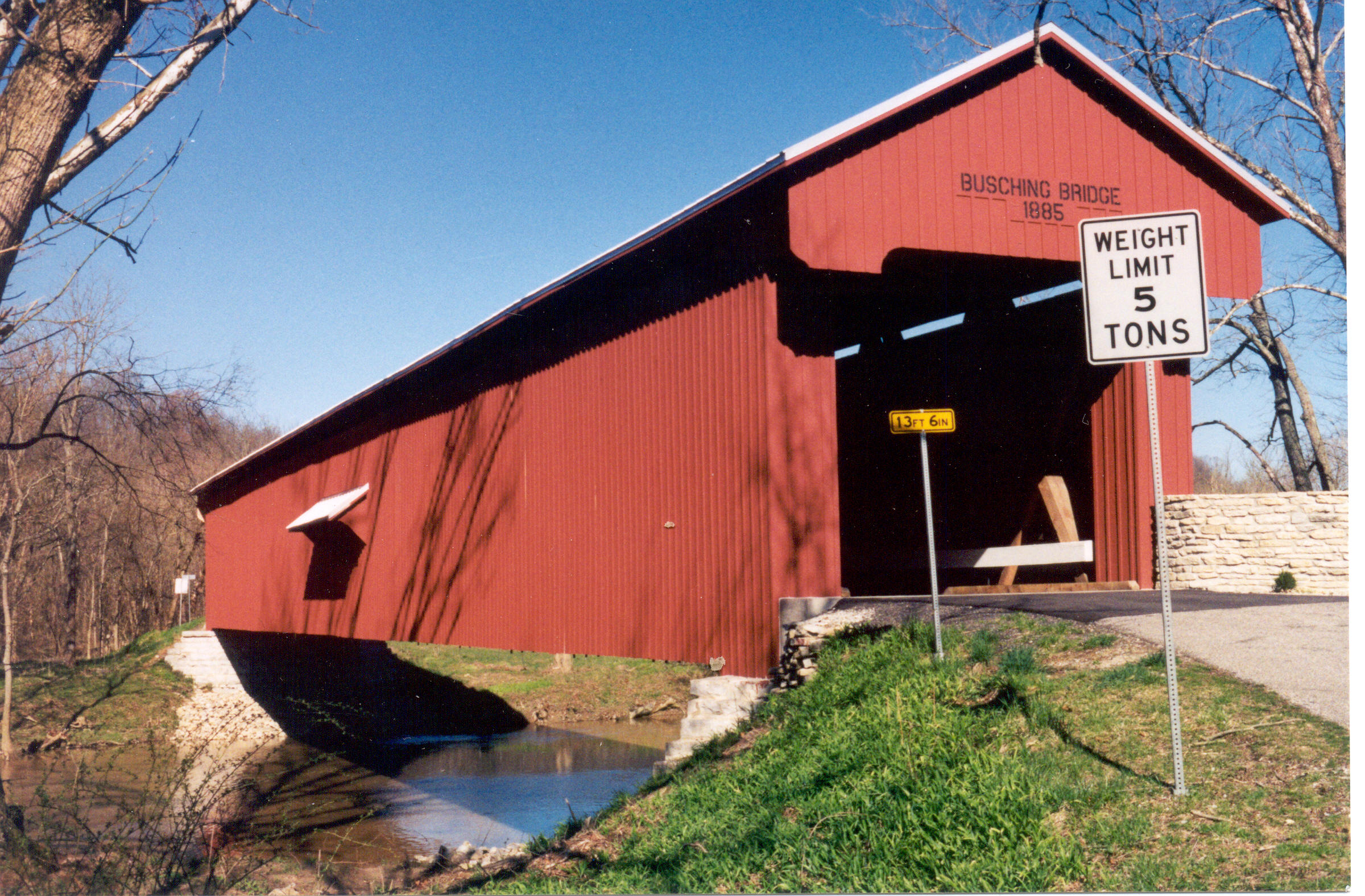
Busching Covered Bridge

It is a recreation area, with fishing and boating on Versailles Lake and Laughery Creek. A covered bridge, the Busching Bridge, crosses the creek. This Howe truss bridge was constructed in 1885, is 176 feet (54 m) long, and although within the state park, Ripley County owns it. The bridge was documented by the Historic American Engineering Record in 1973.

A group camp, originally constructed by the CCC, is available for use as well. Swimming is not allowed in Versailles Lake, but a 25-meter pool is available.

The park was 1 of 14 Indiana State Parks that were in the path of totality for the 2024 solar eclipse, with the park experiencing 1 minute and 55 seconds of totality.
