= Alexander McKee =

British Indian Department officer and merchant

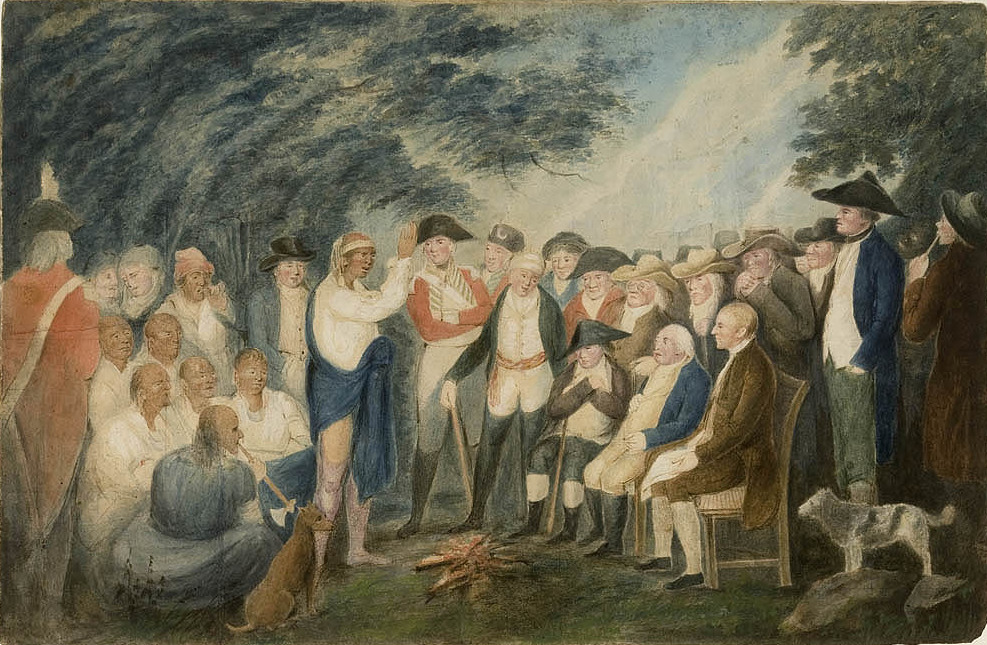
- A possible depiction of McKee (centre) in The Great Indian Council (1793)

Deputy Superintendent-General
- In office 26 December 1794 – 15 January 1799
- Preceded by: Office Created
- Succeeded by: William Claus

Personal details
- Born: c. 1735 Western Pennsylvania, British America
- Died: 15 January 1799 Thames River (Ontario), Upper Canada
- Children: Thomas McKee (son)
- Parent: Thomas McKee Sr./Shawnee woman "Mary"
- Relatives: Blue Jacket, Red Pole, Tecumseh, Tenskatawa the Shawnee Prophet
- Nickname(s): Wapameisheu, The White Elk, the White Moose

Military service
- Allegiance: Britain
- Branch/service: British Indian Department
- Rank: Deputy Superintendent-general
- Battles/wars: American Revolutionary War, Northwest Indian War

Deputy Superintendent-General Alexander McKee (c. 1735 – 15 January 1799) was a British Indian Department officer and merchant who served the American Revolutionary War and the Northwest Indian War. He achieved the rank of deputy superintendent-general in 1794, the second highest position in the Indian Department at the time.

== Biography ==
Alexander McKee was born about 1735, the second son of Thomas McKee an Irish immigrant who worked as fur trader and Indian agent from his trading post on the Susquehanna River near Paxtang, Pennsylvania. McKee developed a lifelong relationship with the Ohio Indian tribes. As a young man, Alexander McKee began working with traders who did business with Indians in the Ohio Country. He soon established his own trading business. Because of his good relations and relatives within the Ohio tribes, the Indian agent George Croghan enlisted McKee to join the Indian Department. Around 1764, McKee settled in what is now McKees Rocks, Pennsylvania, and built a large log house on a 1,200 acre land grant awarded by Colonel Henry Bouquet. George Washington visited him there in 1770, and mentioned it in his diary. Around 1768 or 1769, McKee married Sewatha Sarah Opessa in a Shawnee village on the Scioto River in Ohio. He also had a son, Thomas McKee with Nonhelema Hokolesqua, the Shawnee Chief. Later in life he married Edna Yellow Britches Rising Sun.

McKee continued in the service of Pennsylvania for some time after the outbreak of the American Revolutionary War. After he was the subject of mistreatment by American Patriots, McKee left Pennsylvania and defected to the British at Fort Detroit. During this period, he established his well-known association with Matthew Elliott and the Girty brothers: Simon, James, and George. During the next 25 years, Alexander McKee led efforts to promote the alliance of the Indians with the British, most especially with the Shawnee, but also with the majority of the Northwest Indian tribes. He guarded the interests of the Indians and was their honest friend. The Continental Congress branded him a traitor for remaining loyal to Britain and organizing several tribes on the side of the British. Following Bird's invasion of Kentucky in 1780, several slaves who had been captured by British-allied Indians during the invasion were given to Indian Department agents, including McKee.

"Alexander McKee, the British Indian Agent, who resided at the Machachac towns, on Mad River, during the incursion of General Logan from Kentucky in 1786, was obliged to flee with his effects. He had a large lot of swine, which were driven on to the borders of this stream, and when the Indians came on they called the river Koshko Sepe, which in the Shawnee language signified 'The Creek of the Hogs, or Hog Stream'."

McKee negotiated several treaties on behalf of the British authorities with the Indigenous First Nations of Upper Canada in the Detroit area. This included Treaty 2 or "McKee's Purchase", which surrendered a large part of what is now South-western Ontario.

== Personal life and legacy ==
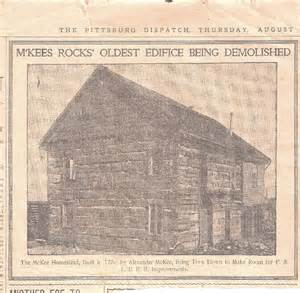
Alexander McKee Log Mansion, McKee's Rocks, PA

McKee had a son, Thomas McKee, with Shawnee leader Nonhelema. Thomas was a Canadian soldier and political figure. His great-great grandson is McKee Rankin of the Rankin acting family.

McKee died in Upper Canada in 1799. He was mourned and greatly honored by the Northwest tribes.

The borough of McKees Rocks, Pennsylvania, is the site of Alexander McKee's original 1,200 acres (490 ha) land grant, which the agent was awarded on 25 November 1764 by Colonel Henry Bouquet. The McKee plantation was called FairView. George Washington dined at Fairview in 1770, and the eight-room log mansion was mentioned by George Washington in his journal. The home was razed by the Pittsburgh and Lake Erie Railroad in 1902.
