= Bird's invasion of Kentucky =

American Revolutionary War military operation

- Part of the American Revolutionary War
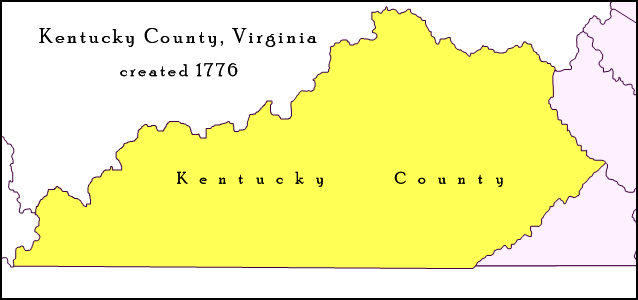
- An illustration of Kentucky County, Virginia
Date	May 25 – August 4, 1780
Location	Kentucky County, Virginia
Result	British and Indigenous tactical victory

Belligerents
Great Britain; Shawnee; Odawa; Ojibwe	United States

Commanders and leaders
Henry Bird; Alexander McKee; Simon Girty; Blue Jacket	Isaac Ruddle (POW)

Strength
150 regulars and militia 700 Indigenous warriors	Unknown

Casualties and losses
1 killed	1-20 killed 350 captured

Bird's invasion of Kentucky in 1780 was one of four concurrent military operations organized by the British in the Trans-Appalachia region during the Revolutionary War. The goal was to clear the Illinois Country and the Mississippi River valley of Spanish and American forces. While Bird's campaign met with limited success, destroying two fortified settlements in Kentucky County and taking several hundred prisoners, it failed its primary objective of destroying the American fort at the Falls of the Ohio.

== Background ==
In the spring of 1780, the British developed a plan for retaking the Illinois Country and attacking Spanish outposts on the Mississippi River. Spain, allied with France, had joined the war against the United Kingdom in 1779 and quickly gained control over British settlements along the Mississippi. Meanwhile, in the Illinois Country, American forces led by George Rogers Clark had taken Kaskaskia and Cakokia in 1778 and Vincennes in 1779.

Four simultaneous operations were planned. At Detroit, Major Arent DePeyster chose Captain Henry Bird of the 8th Regiment of Foot to lead an expedition to capture the American fort at the Falls of the Ohio. From his base at Pensacola, General John Campbell, 5th Duke of Argyll, planned to capture New Orleans then proceed up the Mississippi to Natchez. A third force, led by Emanuel Hesse, would gather at Prairie du Chien, then proceed down the Mississippi to St. Louis, while a fourth led by Charles de Langlade would descend the Illinois River, and take Cahokia before rendezvousing with Hesse.

Neither Campbell, Hesse or Langlade were successful. Campbell became preoccupied with the threat to Pensacola posed by Bernardo de Gálvez, the governor of Spanish Louisiana, who had captured Mobile in March 1780. Despite heavy casualties, the Spanish repulsed Hesse's mostly Indigenous force at the Battle of St. Louis in late May. Langlade, upon learning that Clark had arrived at Cahokia with reinforcements withdraw back up the Illinois River.

== Invasion ==
Bird departed Detroit on May 25, 1780, with 150 regulars and militia. With them were roughly 100 Odawa and Ojibwe, as well as a Royal Artillery detachment with two guns. After crossing Lake Erie, the expedition ascended the Maumee and Auglaze rivers before portaging to the Great Miami River. They descended the Great Miami to its confluence with the Ohio River where they rendezvoused with Alexander McKee of the British Indian Department. McKee had gathered 600 mostly Shawnee warriors led by Blue Jacket. The Indigenous warriors, falsely believing that Clark, a formidable foe in their view, had returned to the Falls, insisted on attacking the isolated settlements on the Licking River instead.

Working its way without opposition up the Licking River, the vanguard of Bird's force reached Ruddle's Station and surrounded it on the night of June 21. The only British fatality during the expedition occurred during a brief exchange of fire with the fort's defenders the following morning. Bird arrived at noon on June 22 with the main body and the artillery. While two rounds from the 3-pounder had little effect, the fort hoisted a white flag when the occupants observed the 6-pounder being moved into position. Simon Girty was sent forward to ask under what terms the fort was willing to surrender. The station's leader, Isaac Ruddle, insisted that the people under his protection should be treated as British captives, under the protection of the British contingent.

Bird and McKee met with Ruddle to work out the details. It was decided that the settlers would surrender to, and be protected by, the British while their Indigenous allies were permitted to plunder and loot property, including slaves. The warriors, however, ignored the terms, burst into the fort and took most of the inhabitants captive. Bird reported that they "rush'd in, tore the poor children from their mothers breasts, killed a wounded man and every one of the cattle." There is some debate about how many were killed. A number of secondary sources repeat a claim made by former Ohio Governor Jeremiah Morrow in 1843 that "twenty persons were tomahawked in cold blood." Simon Kenton who arrived at Ruddle's Station within hours of Bird's departure reported "a number of people lying about killed and scalped." Isaac Ruddle later reported three deaths. Other survivor accounts do not mention any.

When the Indigenous leaders proposed attacking nearby Martin's Station, Bird admonished them for their failure to control their men. He refused to help take Martin's Station unless the warriors agreed to turn over prisoners to the British, and refrain from the wanton killing of cattle and horses. According to McKee, some of the captives at Ruddle's Station were turned over to Bird, however, most remained in Indigenous custody. The settlers at Martin's Station could hear the gunfire at Ruddell's Station and were not surprised when Bird's force arrived. The fort surrendered without firing a shot after receiving assurances that they would be taken to Detroit as prisoners of the British. The warriors plundered and burned the station, and once again killed all of the cattle, but none of the captives were harmed.

The warriors next advocated attacks on Bryan's Station and Lexington, however, Bird refused, citing the lack of provisions and the need to escort the large number of prisoners to Detroit. A warparty of 60 warriors headed to Grant's Station without British support. They discovered that the inhabitants had fled but tracked down and killed three stragglers after burning the fort. After returning to the Ohio River, the British and their Indigenous allies took separate routes to bring their prisoners to Detroit. Bird's regulars and militia escorted about 150 men, women and children, and suffered greatly from the lack of food caused by the indiscriminate killing of livestock at Ruddle's and Martin's stations. Of the 200–250 prisoners taken by the warriors, most were brought to Detroit and ransomed, but a number were killed en route in what historian Russell Mahan has called a death march characterized by "severe cruelty, violence, random murder, and a pervasive fear among the captives." A few others, mostly young women and children, were held captive until the end of the war and in some cases for years afterwards.

== Aftermath ==
News of the attacks spread quickly and resulted in the abandonment of several isolated settlements in Kentucky. To discourage those trying to return east, George Rogers Clark posted guards on the Wilderness Road through the Cumberland Gap. In retaliation for Bird's invasion, he immediately began planning a large-scale raid to punish the Shawnee and discourage future raiding. He assembled men and supplies and in early August defeated the Shawnee at the Battle of Piqua and destroyed the Shawnee villages of Chillicothe and Piqua on the Little Miami River.

Referring to the captives taken at Martin's Station, Bird wrote, "I don't believe we have more than two families that are really Rebels." He noted in his letter to DePeyster that the prisoners were "good farmers with industrious families who are desirous of being settled in Detroit with some good land." Some had apparently moved to Kentucky to escape persecution by Patriots. While a few families were sent to Montreal, most of the captives remained at Detroit until the end of the war. They were granted parole and given employment. Thirteen of the captives were allowed to join Butler's Rangers. When the war ended, most of the captives returned to the United States but some remained permanently in Canada. Some of the slaves that were seized by the warriors during the expedition were gifted to the expedition's leaders, including Bird, McKee and Girty.
