= Don Oakley =

American novelist

- Born: 1927
- Occupation: Author

Don G. Oakley (born 1927) is an American author. He has also been an editorial writer for Scripps Howard News Service and for Newspaper Enterprise Association.

Oakley was a staff writer at Newspaper Enterprise Association from 1957 to 1964, when he was named chief editorial writer. He served in that capacity until 1977, when he joined Scripps Howard.

== Published works ==
- Two Muskets for Washington (1970, ISBN B0006C5BU6)
- The Creston Creeper (1988, ISBN 0-9619465-0-4)
- The Adventure of Christian Fast (1989, ISBN 0-9619465-2-0)
- Slow Burn (1999, ISBN 0-9619465-3-9)
- Aviatrix (2002, ISBN 0-9619465-4-7)
