= Archibald Lochry =

Colonial American military officer

Colonel Archibald Andrew Lochry (April 15, 1733—August 24, 1781) was an American military officer whose command ended in disaster when he and nearly every member of his force were killed or captured by Mohawk forces led by George Girty, the brother of Simon Girty, and Chief Joseph Brant. This skirmish is famously known in early American history as Lochry's Defeat.

== Biography ==
Archibald Lochry was born April 15, 1733, at Octarano Settlement, started 1717, Chester Lancaster County Province of Pennsylvania to Jeremiah Loughry and Mary Murphy. Jeremiah born C.1700 Armagh came to Pennsylvania before 1725, Deed: Chester Co. 3/1725. The family first settled in Lancaster County. In 1737 they moved to York (Adams) where with four others bought 5000 acres known as "Carrolls Delight". About 1775, Archibald married Mary Erwin. (This may have been his second marriage, the first being in 1756).

The Lochry family became prominent in Pennsylvania and Archibald Lochry was one of the strongest men in Westmoreland County. He also successfully acquired large tracts of land, which he used to support his fellow settlers. The colonists on the Pennsylvania frontier had been vulnerable to attack by Shawnee, Delaware, and Sandusky Indians, necessitating a blockhouse as an armory and safe haven between the forts at Hanna's Town and Ligonier. The blockhouse was built on Lochry's land. (In 2002, the Archaeological Institute of America reported that this blockhouse had been rediscovered and preserved as an historical landmark.)

He began his military career on July 18, 1763, as an ensign in the Second Battalion in the provincial service. Both he and his brother William were appointed justices in Bedford County at its organization, and later when Westmoreland County was organized, he was made a justice there as well. In a listing of the deputies to the provincial convention held at Philadelphia, July 15, 1775, Lochry is named as a Westmoreland official in several capacities. In 1777 he was appointed County Lieutenant and Prothonotary in Greensburg, Pennsylvania. In 1778 he was clerk for both the Court of Quarter Sessions and the Orphans Court. In 1781 he was Clerk of Court, Westmoreland County, Pa. Also in 1781, Archibald was made a Colonel and given command over 100 men to discomfort Indian and British forces in the Ohio Valley during the Revolutionary War.

== Military expedition to Ohio ==
Following the French and Indian War and during the colonization of Western Pennsylvania, Virginia and Kentucky, friction between Europeans and Native Americans was an almost constant feature. Repeated depredations and killings by Native Americans and by the European Americans had led to a breakdown in relations on the frontier and formerly neutral or friendly Indian leaders were now generally allied with the British against the Americans.

In 1781, Lochry as the County Lieutenant for Westmoreland County and Colonel Daniel Brodhead, who commanded the Colonial forces at Fort Pitt were unable to agree upon a strategy for meeting Indian attacks upon colonial settlements on the frontiers of Pennsylvania and Ohio. As a result, no effective action was taken and attacks increased. Finally, General George Rogers Clark of Virginia came north to prosecute the war in Northern Virginia (now West Virginia) and Pennsylvania. Clark requested that Lochry organize a militia of Pennsylvania Rangers and join him. At the same time, George Washington ordered Broadhead to support the expedition with supplies and ammunition. The Indian activities were of such a grave concern to settlers that Lochry had no problem enlisting and organizing a unit of 107 men by July 1781.

The plan of attack was developed by General Clark. Its declared mission was to take an army into the heart of the Indian country, to burn their houses, devastate their country, destroy their warriors, and to so weaken them that they would thereafter be unable to disturb the settlers of Western Pennsylvania. (Privately, Clark's grand objective was the capture of the British outpost at Detroit.) The specific attack strategy began with an expedition down the Ohio River in a manner to similar campaigns that Clark had led in the past. General Clark's plan was to divide his forces into two groups, one commanded by himself and the other commanded by Lochry. The two forces were to move down the Ohio River together and then split up. Lochry was to move north against the Sandusky tribe while Clark would go west and south, join up with troops from Kentucky and move against the Shawnee and Delaware. Once they had their enemies defeated, they would rejoin and march on Detroit to capture it from the British.

Initially Clark's forces and Lochry's forces would be supplied at Ft Pitt, resupply at Fort Henry in Wheeling and then begin the trek down the Ohio River. Lochry's party of one hundred & seven mounted volunteers rendezvoused at Carnahan's Block House, eleven miles west of Hanna's town, on the July 24, 1781, but then things did not go as planned. They were delayed as they waited for supplies from Brodhead, which never materialized and so they began their march on August 2. General Clark was already on his way toward Forth Henry. Rushing to catch up, Lochry's troops arrived on August 8, only to find that Clark and all the men, boats and stores he could gather had departed just twelve hours earlier. Clark left a letter for Lochry, affixed to a pole, directing Lochry to follow him to the Falls of the Ohio.

Clark was in a difficult situation. His troops were farmers and were desperate to get back home to start bringing in crops. They were deserting whenever he would stop for a period (Lochry apprehended a Lieutenant Baker and sixteen men who were deserting from Clark at Fishing creek.) So even though he needed to have a larger force for penetrating the enemy lands, he was also obliged to keep moving in order to curtail desertions. But, leading the way for Lochry, Clark was uncertain that Lochry was even following him and so, did not leave the supplies that Lochrey desperately needed.

Though Lochry's troops were not deserting he also had a difficult situation. At Fort Henry, his stores and forage gave out. So, he detached a Captain Shannon with seven men in a small boat to overtake Clark and secure supplies. Shannon carried this letter with him:

Wheeling, Augt. 8th, 1781.

My dear General.

I arrived at this Post this moment. I find that there is neither Boats, provisions or ammunition left. I have sent a small canoe after you to know what is to be done. If you send back these articles mentioned and with directions where I will overtake you, I will follow. We are upwards of one hundred strong including Light Horse.

I am, Sir,

Yours

(Signed) A. Lockry.

Shannon's party had not proceeded far when the Indians, who were carefully watching the expedition, captured him and all of his men. They also obtained the letter to General Clark detailing Lochry's situation. The Indians, having learned of his lack of ammunition, immediately arranged to attack Lochry. They called in their braves and raised a force of about 150 warriors. The attack party was commanded by George Girty, who along with his brother Simon Girty (a more notorious traitor), led the hostile Indians against the colonialists on the frontier. Captain Shannon's small group was forced to accompany the Indians for several days, while they followed Lochry down the river, at a discrete distance and waited the arrival of additional 500 men with which they intended ultimately to attack.

== Lochry's Defeat ==
Traveling down the middle of the Ohio River offered some protection against attacks. However, the route also made it difficult for men and horses to obtain food.

At about 10:00 in the morning on August 24, 1781, Lochry ignored the danger and ordered his men to put onto shore on the north side of the Ohio River about ten miles below the mouth of the Big Miami, near the present-day town of Aurora, Indiana. The horses were left to graze, and the men killed a buffalo to prepare for their sustenance.

Girty had his Indian scouts out along both banks of the river, and news of the landing was immediately communicated to his now larger force of 648 warriors. Some of the men took up positions quietly on a bluff overlooking the sand bar on which the Pennsylvania Rangers were located. Others approached stealthily from the opposite bank of the river. Once in position, they took the militia by surprise with a sudden volley of shots.

The soldiers seized their arms and fought for their lives as long as they had ammunition. They tried to escape in their boats, but the Indians pursued and closed in onto them before they could get away. Unable to escape or defend themselves, Lochry and his troops surrendered. Every member of the expedition still alive was captured.

Lochry was tomahawked by a Shawnee Indian while Lochry was sitting on a log, and all wounded who were unable to march were similarly dispatched. The prisoners were marched eight miles up the Miami River, taken to Detroit, and sent from there to Montreal. Along the way, they were sold to the British. The average price for a soldier was one gallon of whisky.

The initial number of deaths was 37, but perhaps as few as 25 soldiers returned from captivity to describe what happened. In the intervening years, family and friends had no news of the expedition or the fate of the men. Even General Clark was not aware of Lochry's defeat until several months later.

Lochry is remembered to this day in the name of places near the battle site, including Laughery Creek and Laughery Island.

== Members of the expedition ==
British officers confiscated letters and other information from the captured and dead militiamen. These documents have been re-discovered in England and help provide insights into the battle. Among the documents is a roster of the troops killed or captured. It may have been prepared by Simon Girty. In addition, some of the members officers who were captured kept records and pension applications make mention of some individuals in this group. A list of the members of the expedition is shown below along with variant name spellings and if available, approximate age at the time of the capture.:

Killed

- 1. Col. Archibald Lochry
- 2. Capt. William Campbell
- 3. Ens. Ephraim Ralph
- 4. Ens. Alexander Maxwell
- 5. Ens. Cahill
- 6. Sergt. Galaher
- 7. Sergt. Evens
- 8. Sergt. Ebenezer Burris (accidental self-inflicted knife wound)
- 9. Sergt. Forsyth
- 10. Sergt. James Black
- 11. Sergt. Allison
- 12. Corp. Paton
- 13. John Gibson
- 14. John Young
- 15. Robt. Dongan
- 16. John Straiton
- 17. John Burns
- 18. William Hudson
- 19. John Pheasant (probably Pershing)
- 20. Zenis Hardon
- 21. John Milligan
- 22. John Corn
- 23. Mathew Lamb
- 24. Joseph Baily
- 25. John Smith
- 26. Wm. Cain
- 27. Adam Erwin
- 28. Peter McLin
- 29. Archibald Askin
- 30. David Ellinger
- 31. George Butcher
- 32. Peter Berkman
- 33. Josia Brooks
- 34. John Row
- 35. Jonas Peter
- 36. J. McRight
- 37. John McKimby

Prisoners

- 1. Major Craigcraft
- 2. Capt. Stokly
- 3. Cap. Orr (Robert Orr, Wash. Twp.)
- 4. Cap. Shannon (Donegal Twp.)
- 5. Lt. Robinson
- 6. Lt. Isaac Anderson*
- 7. Lt. Craig*
- 8. Lt. Scott
- 9. Lt. Melchior (or Melcher) Baker
- 10. Ens. Hunter
- 11. Ens. Guthrie.
- 12. Qr. Mr. Wallace (William or Richard Wallace)
- 13. Sergt. Trimble
- 14. Sergt. McCloud
- 15. Patrick Johnson
- 16. Richard Fleming
- 17. Robert Watson
- 18. Abn Anderson
- 19. Mcl Hare
- 20. Wm. Mars
- 21. John Sense
- 22. Mcl Miller
- 23. Patrick Murphy
- 24. Jas. Cain (should be Kean)
- 25. Jas. McPherson
- 26. Wm. Martial
- 27. Peter Conoly
- 28. John Farrell
- 29. Denis McCarthy
- 30. Solomon Atkill
- 31. John Lavear
- 32. Mathias Fisher*
- 33. George Dice
- 34. John Porter
- 35. John Smith
- 36. Adam Ourry
- 37. Saml Le Fever

(Prisoners Continued)

- 38. John Hunter
- 39. Joseph Erwin
- 40. Manassa Coyl
- 41. Hugh Steer
- 42. John Catt
- 43. Valantine Lawrence
- 44. Jacob Lawrence
- 45. Christian Fast
- 46. Charles McLin
- 47. William Noach
- 48. Henry France
- 49. Abm Highly
- 50. George Mason
- 51. Wm. Witherenton
- 52. Eairy Cuighly
- 53. Thos. James
- 54. Thos. Atkinson
- 55. John Stackhouse
- 56. Wm. Clark
- 57. Elishia Risley
- 58. James Dunseith
- 59. Danl. Cain
- 60. Wm. Think
- 61. Robert Wilson
- 62. Isaac Lewis
- 63. Alex Burns
- 64. Hugh More
- 65. Pvt. William Roark - 1760 – 1841
- 66. Pvt. Isaac Paullins (Pollins)

Additional members may include:

- George Bailey***
- James Dougherty***
- William Roark** ***

(*According to his pension application, Mathias Fisher escaped, but was later captured by Indians. He was traded to the British, escaped and walked home to Westmoreland, Pennsylvania.)

(**Additional Excerpts of William Roark's separation with his regiment under Captain Michael Catt who was to become part of General Clarks army and his captivity as a POW with the Ohio Indians who moved him to Canada and his fight with Congress to collect his Revolutionary War Pension #S32495 can be found on the Fisher Family Genealogy site www.fishergenes.com and at the National Archives in Washington D.C.)

(***This list of 103 persons compares to a total of about 107 men reported in contemporary documents. Some men may have escaped the capture and are missing from this list.)
