= Laughery Creek Bridge =

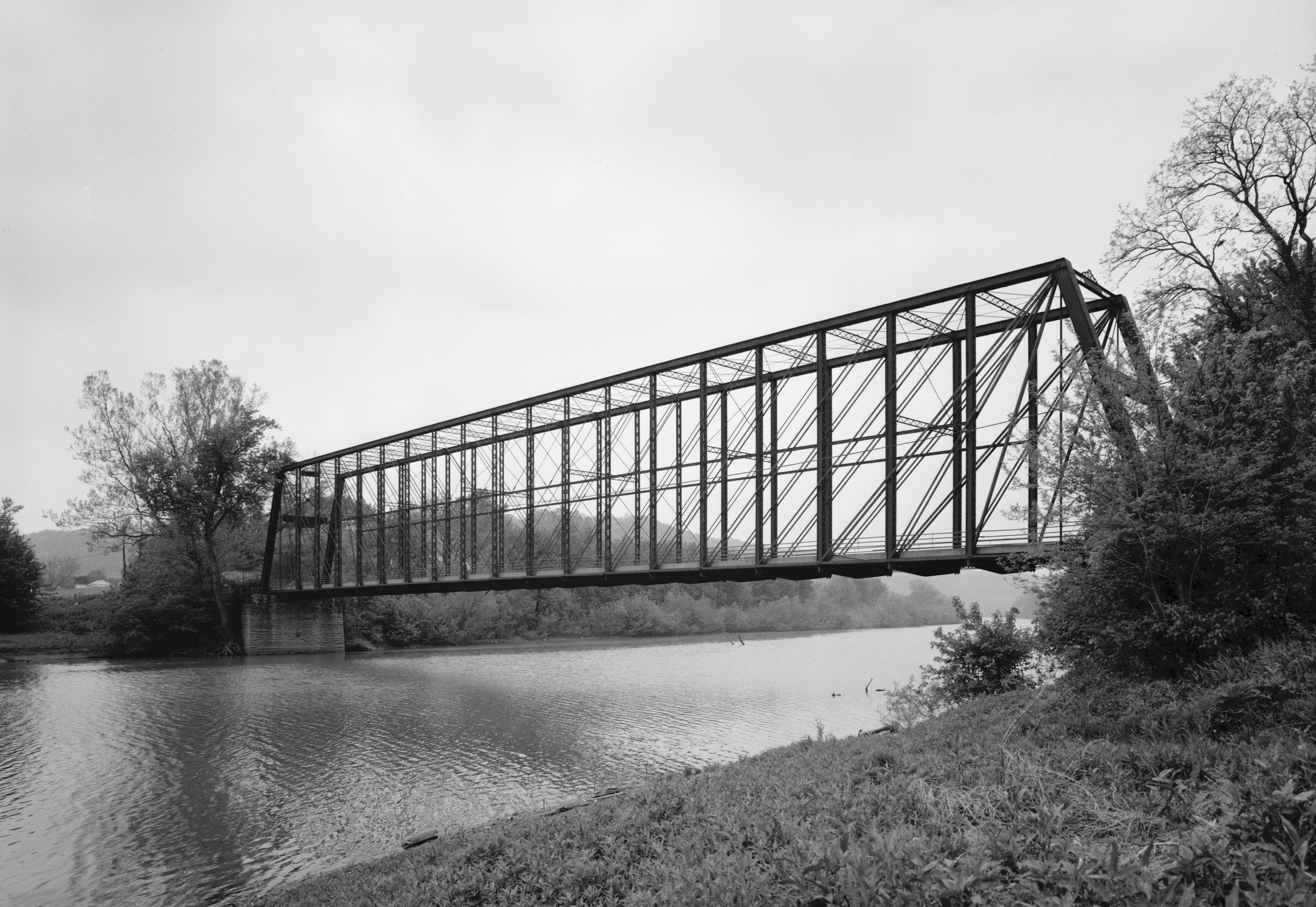
- Laughery Creek Bridge, 1974
- Coordinates: 39°01′29″N 84°53′09″W
- Crosses: Laughery Creek
- Locale: Dearborn County, Indiana and Ohio County, Indiana
- Other name: Triple Whipple Bridge

Characteristics
- Design: Triple-intersection Pratt truss
- Total length: 298.8 feet (91.1 m)
- Width: 17 feet (5.2 m)
- Longest span: 297.5 feet (90.7 m)
- Clearance above: 21.4 feet (6.5 m)

History
- Opened: 1878
- Laughery Creek Bridge
- U.S. National Register of Historic Places
- Location within Indiana Location within the United States
- Location: South of Aurora west of State Road 56, Center Township, Dearborn County, Indiana
- Area: less than one acre
- Built: 1868
- Built by: Wrought Iron Bridge Company; Green, William & Co.
- Architectural style: Triple-intersection Pratt
- NRHP reference No.: 76000018
- Added to NRHP: September 29, 1976

Location
- Interactive map of Laughery Creek Bridge

Plan of a triple whipple truss

The Laughery Creek Bridge is the only known example of a triple Whipple truss bridge; it is located on the border of Dearborn County, Indiana, and Ohio County, Indiana. It crosses Laughery Creek. This bridge was built in 1868. The Wrought Iron Bridge Company, a prolific late 19th-century bridge company, constructed the bridge. The bridge is seated on stone abutments. The deck surface is not original and is currently concrete. The bridge, nearly 300 feet (91 m) in length, is a single-span, pin-connected, triple-intersection Whipple through truss, and is the only example in the world of this truss type. The name bridge's nickname, "Triple Whipple Bridge" is a play on words. The double-intersection Pratt, which was called the Whipple truss configuration, was a far more common variation of the standard Pratt configuration. Since the Laughery Creek Bridge's members have three intersections instead of two, this gives rise to the "Triple Whipple" name. This bridge was listed on the National Register of Historic Places in 1976.

After closing in the 1970s, the bridge fell into serious disrepair, landing it on Indiana's 10 Most Endangered places list in 1993. A combination of federal funds and matching funds from Dearborn and Ohio Counties allowed the bridge to be refurbished and converted to pedestrian use in 2009.

== See also ==
- List of bridges documented by the Historic American Engineering Record in Indiana
