= Laughery Creek =

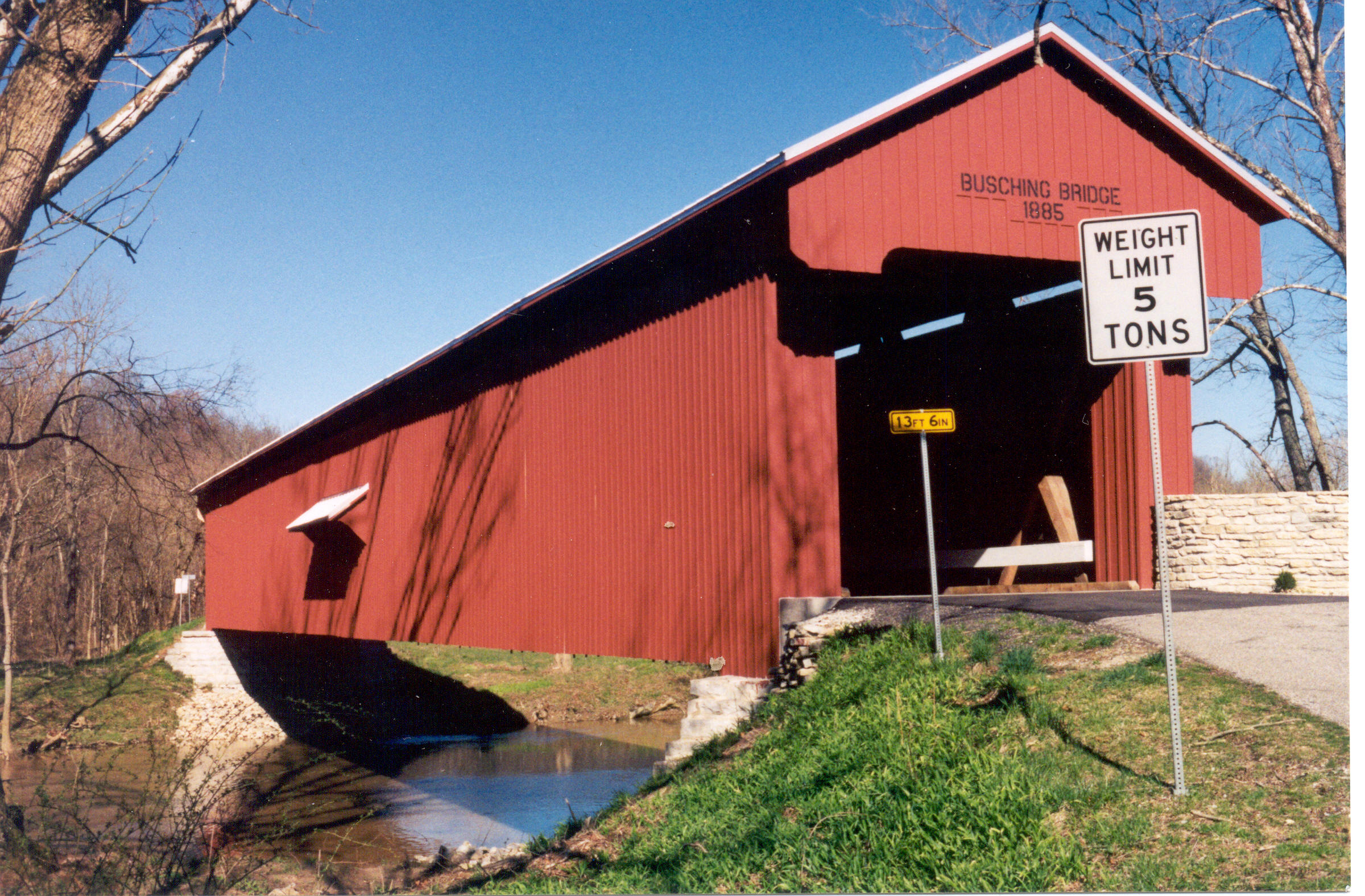
- Built in 1885, the historic Busching Covered Bridge crosses Laughery Creek just below the Versailles Lake Dam.

- Location of mouth

Location
- Country: United States
- State: Indiana
- Region: Ripley County
- Cities: Versailles, Friendship, Milton

Physical characteristics
- Source
  - coordinates: 39°11′29″N 85°19′42″W
  - elevation: 993 ft (303 m)
- Mouth: Ohio River
  - location: Border of Indiana and Kentucky
  - coordinates: 39°01′52″N 84°52′40″W
  - elevation: 454 ft (138 m)

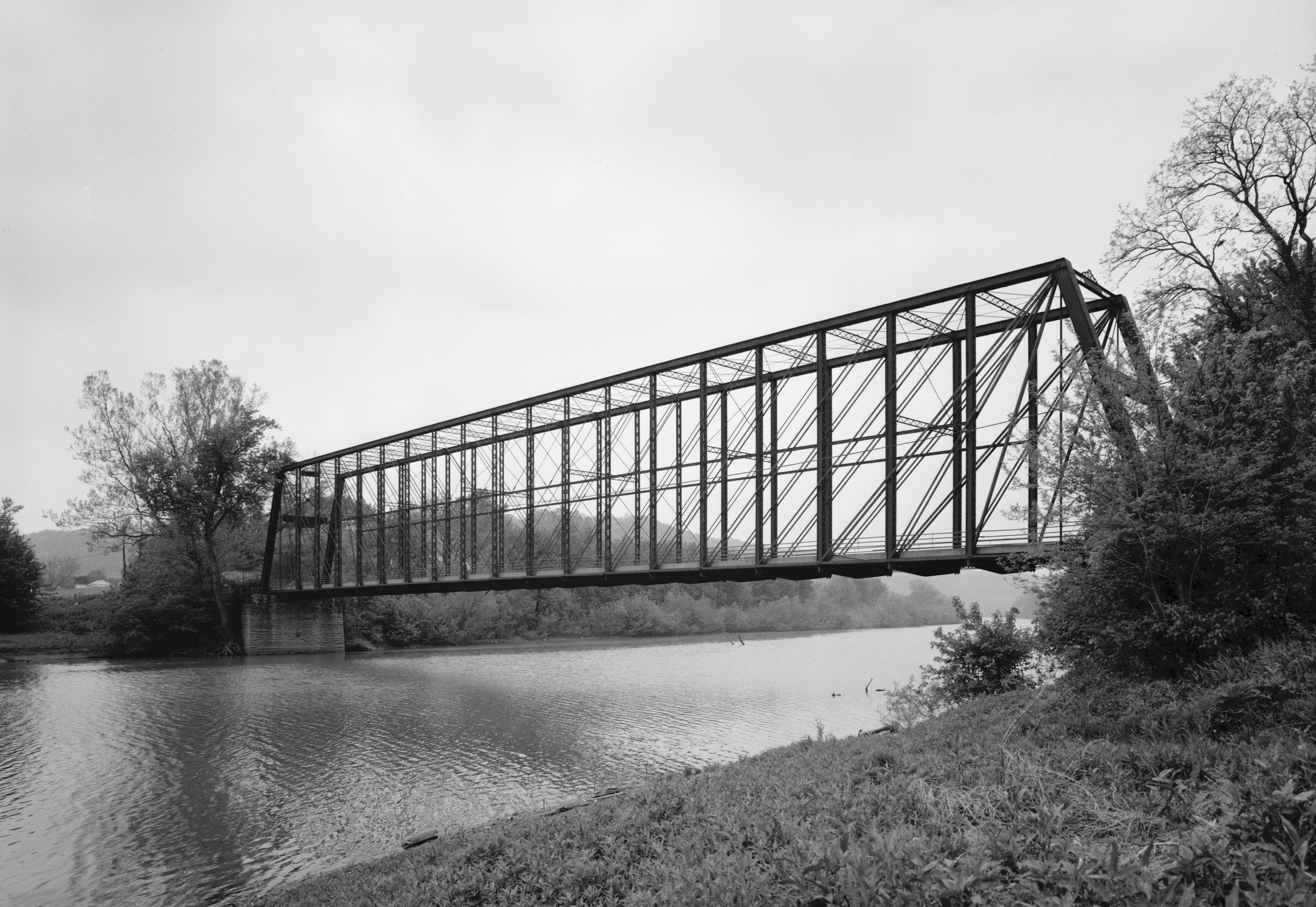
The Laughery Creek Bridge aka Triple Whipple Bridge was built in 1878 and is the last triple-intersection Pratt truss bridge in the United States.

Laughery Creek is an 88.6-mile-long (142.6 km) stream that flows through Ripley, Dearborn, and Ohio counties in southeastern Indiana, and is a tributary of the Ohio River.

== History ==
Laughery Creek was named in memory of Lochry's Defeat, a Revolutionary War skirmish that occurred at the mouth of the creek, two miles south of present-day Aurora, Indiana on August 24, 1781. Colonel Archibald Lochry and his Pennsylvania militiamen, were rafting down the Ohio River to join George Rogers Clark in an attack on the British garrison at Fort Detroit. After two days of river travel they sighted and shot an American bison (Bison bison) at the mouth of what would come to be called Laughery Creek. While the Pennsylvanians were cooking fresh bison meat for breakfast, they were ambushed by Joseph Brant, a Mohawk military leader allied with the British. Lochry and 40 of his men were killed.

The Busching Covered Bridge crosses the creek at Covered Bridge Road, just below the Versailles Lake Dam. This 176 feet (54 m) covered bridge was constructed in 1885 by Thomas A. Hardman. The timbers for the superstructure are said to have been cut from the site of the local Baptist church. The 170 foot clear span over Laughery Creek utilizes a modified Howe truss design and the varying dimensions of the structural members address the changing loads and resulting forces.

The Triple Whipple Bridge, also known as the Laughery Creek Bridge, spans 300 feet (0.091 km) of Laughery Creek, near the creek's mouth at the Ohio River. The bridge was built in 1878 by the Wrought Iron Bridge Company of Canton, Ohio. Its unusual name relates to its design - it is the last triple-intersection Pratt truss bridge in the United States. Today it is a pedestrian bridge connecting Ohio and Dearborn counties, and is listed on the National Register of Historic Places.

== Watershed and course ==
Laughery Creek drains 343 square miles (890 km^{2}). It begins in northwestern Ripley County southwest of Napoleon and flows northeast then southeast to Versailles, where it turns east and serves as the boundary between Dearborn and Ohio Counties. Laughery Creek enters the Ohio River 2 miles (3.2 km) south of Aurora, Indiana.

In 1954, a large dam was constructed across Laughery Creek at Versailles to form 230-acre Versailles Lake. No fish ladder is present; consequently, the dam acts as an impassable barrier to upstream fish migration. Versailles Lake is contained within Versailles State Park.

== Ecology and Habitat ==
Versailles State Park provides naturally wooded cover for much of Laughery Creek. Historically the region was unusually dense forest. Dominant tree species include American beech, white ash, blue ash, sugar maple, chinquapin oak (Quercus muehlenbergii), red oak, shagbark hickory, tulip tree, Ohio buckeye, and black walnut.

Rare species in the watershed include the bobcat (Lynx rufus), the Henslow's sparrow (Ammodramus henslowii), the northern harrier (Circus cyaneus), and the barn owl (Tyto alba). Between 1995 and 1999, the river otter (Lontra canadensis) were reestablished in Indiana, the closest being the Big Oaks National Wildlife Refuge, formerly the Jefferson Proving Grounds in Jefferson County. From there the state endangered river otter has returned to the Laughery Creek watershed.

In a 1995 Indiana Department of Natural Resources fish survey, the bluntnose minnow (Pimephales notatus) was the most abundant species collected by number (19%), followed by the longear sunfish (Lepomis megalotis) (14%), gizzard shad (Dorosoma cepedianum) (12%), and the golden redhorse (Moxostoma erythrurum) (11%). The remaining 53 kinds of fish each comprised (6%) or less of the total by number.

== Recreation ==
Much of the creek below Versailles Lake Dam is navigable by canoe and fishing is a major pastime. Rock bass (Ambloplites rupestris), spotted bass (Micropterus punctulatus), and smallmouth bass (Micropterus dolomieu) provide good fishing possibilities, as well as numerous species of panfish such as the longear sunfish. In spring spawning season, sauger (Stizostedion canadense) and white bass (Morone chrysops) migrating up from the Ohio River can be caught in Laughery Creek up to the dam at Versailles.

== See also ==
- Laughery Creek Bridge
- List of rivers of Indiana
