= Lochry's Defeat =

1781 American Revolutionary War battle

- Part of the American Revolutionary War
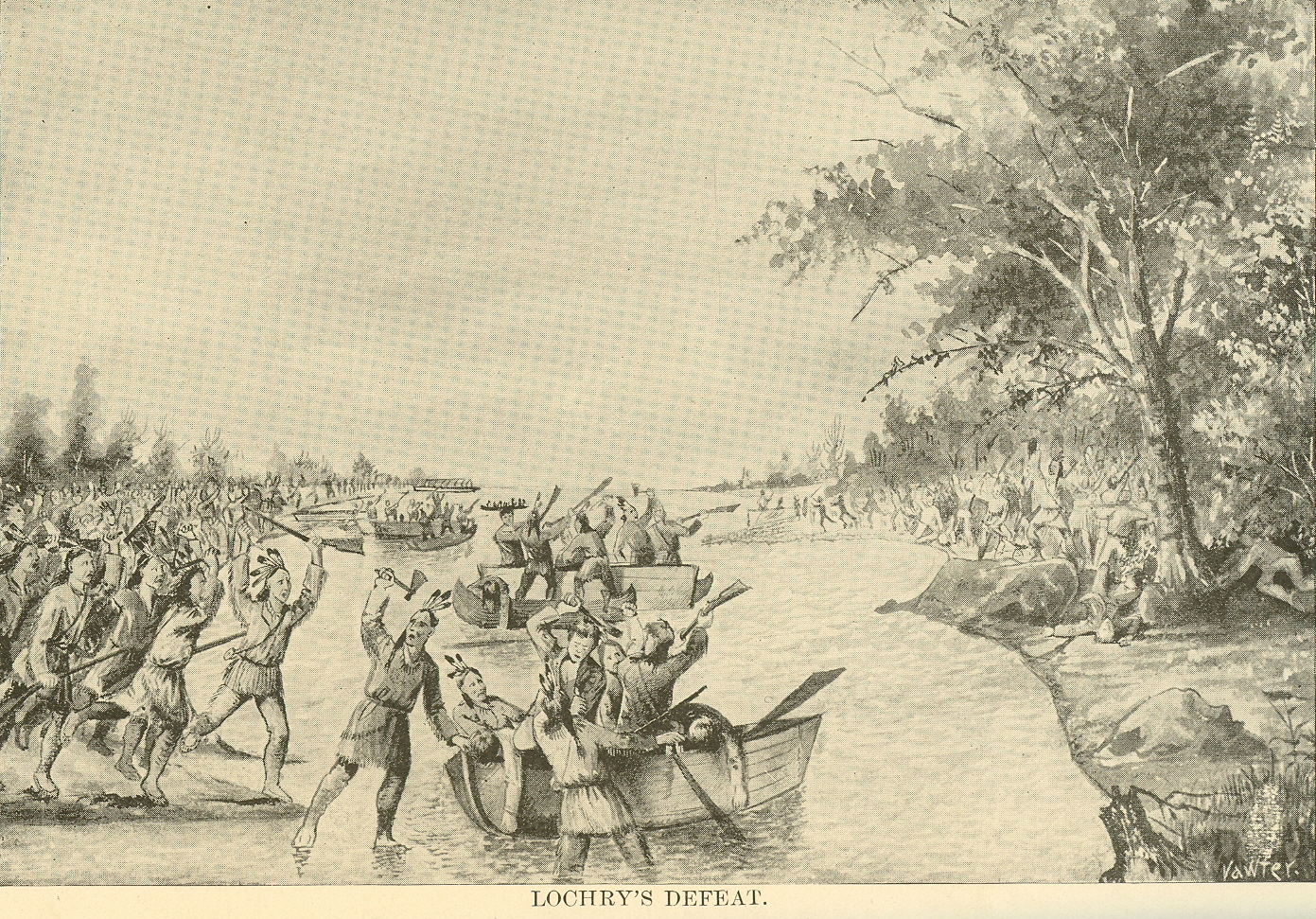
- Lochry's Defeat, Will Vawter, c. 1895
Date	August 24, 1781
Location	South of Aurora, Indiana 39°1′33″N 84°53′10″W
Result	British-Indian victory

Belligerents
Great Britain; Iroquois; Shawnee; Wyandot	United States

Commanders and leaders
George Girty; Joseph Brant	Archibald Lochry †

Strength
90–100 irregulars and Indians	100+ militia

Casualties and losses
None	37–41 killed 60–64 captured

Lochry's Defeat, also known as the Lochry massacre, was a battle fought on August 24, 1781, near present-day Aurora, Indiana, in the United States. The battle was part of the American Revolutionary War (1775–1783), which began as a conflict between Great Britain and the Thirteen Colonies before spreading to the western frontier, where American Indians entered the war as British allies. The battle was short and decisive: about one hundred Indians of local tribes led by Joseph Brant, a Mohawk military leader who was temporarily in the west, ambushed a similar number of Pennsylvania militiamen led by Archibald Lochry. Brant and his men killed or captured all of the Pennsylvanians without suffering any casualties.

Lochry's force was part of an army being raised by Brigadier General George Rogers Clark for a campaign against Detroit, the British regional headquarters. Clark, the preeminent American military leader on the northwestern frontier, worked with Governor Thomas Jefferson of Virginia in planning an expedition to capture Detroit, by which they hoped to bring an end to British support of the Indian war effort. In early August 1781, Clark and about 400 men left Fort Pitt in Pennsylvania by boat, floating down the Ohio River a few days ahead of Lochry and his men, who were trying to catch up.

Joseph Brant's force was part of a combined British and Indian army being raised to counter Clark's offensive. Brant had too few men to challenge Clark, but when he intercepted messengers traveling between Clark and Lochry, he learned about Lochry's smaller group bringing up the rear. When Lochry landed to feed his men and horses, Brant launched his overwhelmingly successful ambush. Because Clark had been able to recruit only a fraction of the men he needed for his campaign, the loss of Lochry's men resulted in the cancellation of Clark's expedition.

== Background ==
In the Ohio River valley, the American Revolutionary War was fought primarily between American colonists south and east of the Ohio River (in present-day Western Pennsylvania, West Virginia, and Kentucky) and American Indians with their British allies north of the river (now the Midwestern United States). From Detroit, the British recruited and supplied Indian war parties to attack American forts and settlements, hoping to divert American military resources from the primary theater of war in the East as well as keep the Indians—and the lucrative fur trade—firmly attached to the British Empire. Indians of the Ohio Country, primarily the Shawnee, Mingo, Delaware, and Wyandot, hoped to drive American settlers out of Kentucky and reclaim their hunting grounds, which they had lost in the Treaty of Fort Stanwix (1768) and Lord Dunmore's War (1774).

The Americans sought to hold on to Kentucky and to secure territorial claims to the region by launching sporadic expeditions against hostile Indian settlements north of the Ohio River. George Rogers Clark, a Virginia militia officer in Kentucky, believed that the Americans could ultimately win the border war by capturing Detroit. He laid the groundwork for this objective in 1779 by seizing the British outpost of Vincennes and capturing the British commander of Detroit, lieutenant governor Henry Hamilton. "This stroke", said Clark, "will nearly put an end to the Indian War." Clark prepared for a Detroit campaign in 1779 and again in 1780, but each time called off the expedition because of insufficient men and supplies. "Detroit lost for want of a few Men", he lamented.

== Planning Clark's campaign ==
[I]f we fall through in our present plans and no expedition should take place, it is to be feared that the consequences will be fatal to the whole frontier... —George Rogers Clark to George Washington, May 20, 1781

In late 1780, Clark traveled east to consult with Thomas Jefferson, the governor of Virginia, about an expedition in 1781. Jefferson devised a plan which called for Clark to lead 2,000 men against Detroit, with the hope of preventing a rumored British offensive against Kentucky. To avoid potential conflicts over rank with Continental Army colonels while organizing the campaign, Clark requested that Jefferson promote him to brigadier general in the Continental Army. Army rules precluded Clark from receiving a Continental commission, however, because Clark held his colonel's commission from Virginia rather than the United States. Jefferson instead promoted Clark to the Virginia rank of "Brigadier General of the forces to be embodied on an expedition westward of the Ohio". In January, Clark left for Fort Pitt in western Pennsylvania to assemble his men and supplies. His goal was to have the expedition ready for departure from Fort Pitt by June 15.

As with earlier campaigns, recruiting enough men was a problem. Jefferson called for the western counties of Virginia to provide militia manpower for Clark's campaign, but county officials protested that they could not spare the men. Militiamen did not want to set out on a lengthy expedition—they would be gone for six months to a year—while their families and homes were threatened by Lord Cornwallis's army in the east, by Indian raids from the north, and by Loyalists at home. Because of this resistance, Jefferson called for volunteers rather than ordering the militia to accompany the expedition.

In addition to volunteers, Jefferson also arranged for a regiment of 200 regular Continental soldiers under Colonel John Gibson to accompany Clark. Longstanding tensions between Continental Army officers and the militia made such cooperation problematic, however. Colonel Daniel Brodhead, the Continental Army commander at Fort Pitt, refused to detach men for Clark's campaign because he was staging his own expedition against the Delaware Indians, who had recently entered the war against the Americans. Brodhead marched into the Ohio Country and destroyed the Delaware Indian capital of Coshocton in April. This resulted in the Delaware becoming more determined enemies, and deprived Clark of badly needed men and supplies for the Detroit campaign.

Clark also had problems recruiting men from Pennsylvania: lingering resentment due to the recently settled border dispute between Virginia and Pennsylvania meant that few Pennsylvanians were willing to participate in an expedition headed by a Virginian. Clark's controversial attempt to draft Pennsylvanians into service created even more ill will. One Pennsylvanian who supported Clark was Colonel Archibald Lochry, commander of the Westmoreland County militia. On July 4, Lochry wrote to Joseph Reed, the President of the Supreme Executive Council of Pennsylvania:

We have very distressing times Here this summer. The Enemy are almost constantly in our County Killing and Captivating the Inhabitants. I see no way we can have of defending ourselves other than by offensive operations. General Clarke [sic] has Requested our assistance to Enable him to carry an Expedition into the Indian Country.

With Reed's approval, Lochry began recruiting men for Clark's expedition. Many Westmoreland men did not want to leave their homes undefended, and so Lochry was only able to enlist about 100 volunteers for the campaign.

When Clark finally left Fort Pitt in August, he was accompanied by only 400 men, although he expected to meet Lochry and his Pennsylvanians at Fort Henry (present Wheeling, West Virginia). Clark was angry about the lack of support given his campaign, but he still hoped that the Kentucky militia, who were to rendezvous with him at Fort Nelson (Louisville, Kentucky), would provide additional men. He intended to at least carry out an expedition against enemy Indians if he did not have enough men to attack Detroit.

== Indian and British preparations ==
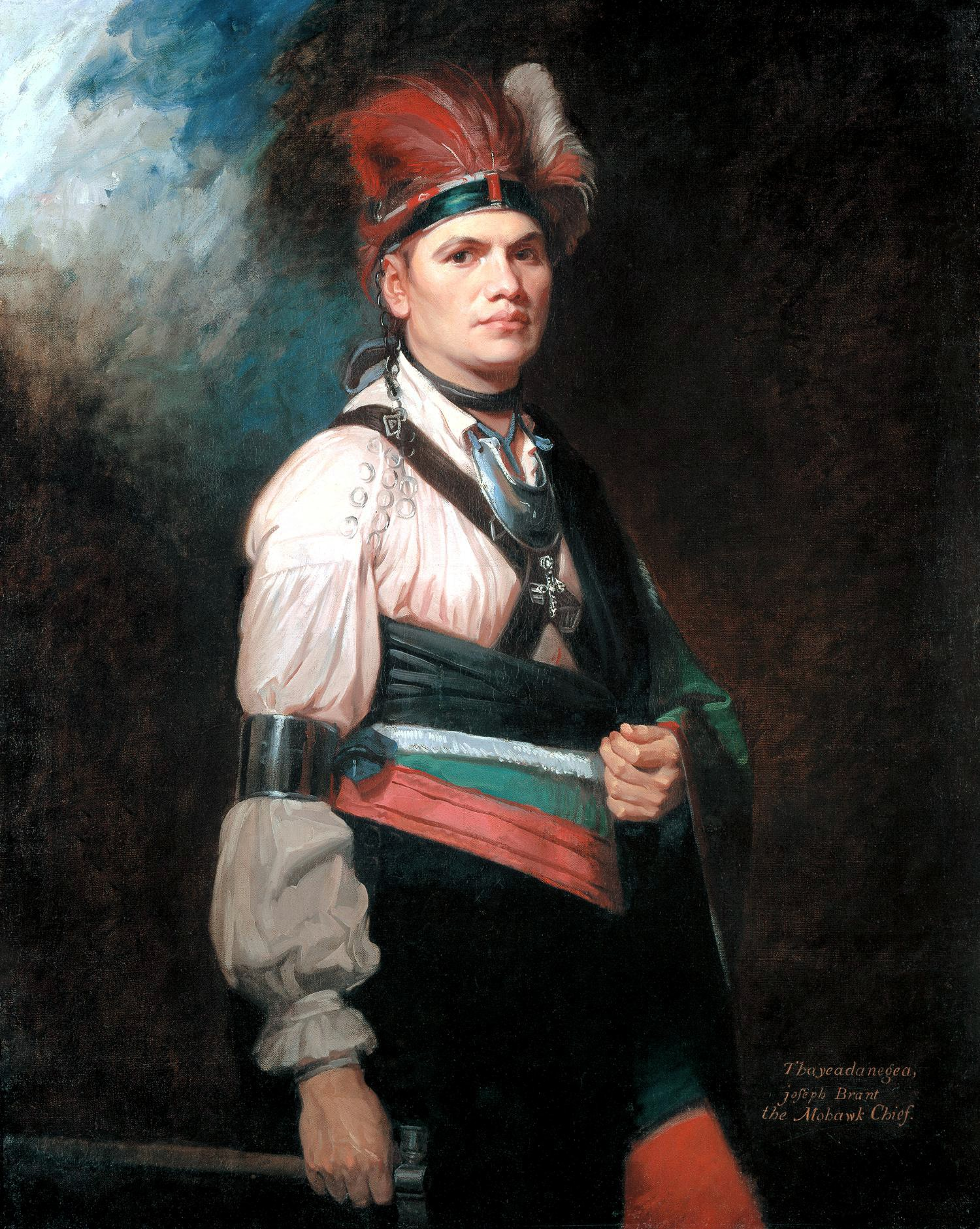
Joseph Brant (Thayendanegea), painted in London by George Romney in 1776

Thanks to an effective intelligence network, British officials and their American Indian allies were aware of Clark's planned expedition as early as February. In April, a council was held at Detroit in order to prepare a defense. The commander at Detroit was Major Arent DePeyster, Henry Hamilton's replacement, who reported to Sir Frederick Haldimand, the Governor of the Province of Quebec. DePeyster used agents of the British Indian Department such as Alexander McKee and Simon Girty, both of whom had close relations with American Indians of the Ohio Country, to coordinate British and Indian military operations.

Joining the Detroit conference was an Iroquois delegation headed by Joseph Brant (or Thayendanegea), a military leader of the Mohawks, one of the Six Nations of the Iroquois Confederacy. Brant was a minor war chief when the war began, but his ability to speak English and his connections with British officials made him prominent in British eyes. When Brant traveled to London in 1775 to discuss Mohawk land grievances, Lord George Germain, the colonial secretary, vaguely promised him that if the Iroquois supported the Crown during the war, native land grievances would be redressed after the rebellion had been suppressed. Brant returned home and encouraged the Iroquois, who lived mostly in upstate New York, to enter the war as British allies. Four tribes of the Six Nations eventually did so.

Brant became a skilled partisan commander during the war, initially leading about 100 men known as "Brant's Volunteers". Because the traditional Iroquois leaders regarded Brant as an upstart who was too closely connected to the British, most of his volunteers were white Loyalists. Brant gained additional native followers during the war and was perhaps the only Indian to be commissioned as a British captain, but he was not, as has sometimes been claimed, the head war chief of the Iroquois. Brant took part in a joint British-Indian invasion of New York in 1777, which for the British ended in a disastrous surrender at Saratoga. Afterwards, he led numerous frontier raids, both before and after the massive American invasion of 1779, which left the Iroquois lands devastated.

In April, with the New York frontier in ruins, the British transferred Brant to Detroit. The official reason for the move was that Brant was needed to help rally Indian support to counter Clark's anticipated campaign. An apparent unofficial cause was that Brant, who was usually a moderate drinker, had been transferred after getting into a drunken fistfight with an Indian Department officer at Fort Niagara. Although the "Western Indians" of the Ohio Country and Detroit region had strained relations with the Iroquois, they cautiously welcomed Brant's help.

At the Detroit council, DePeyster encouraged the Indians to unite and to send a force to oppose Clark's expedition. In May, Indian leaders and Indian Department officials began to gather warriors at the Wyandot town of Upper Sandusky for this purpose. In mid-August, Brant and George Girty, Simon's brother, headed south to the Ohio River with about 90 Iroquois, Shawnee, and Wyandot warriors, as well as a few white men, while McKee and Simon Girty continued to collect reinforcements.

== Lochry follows Clark ==
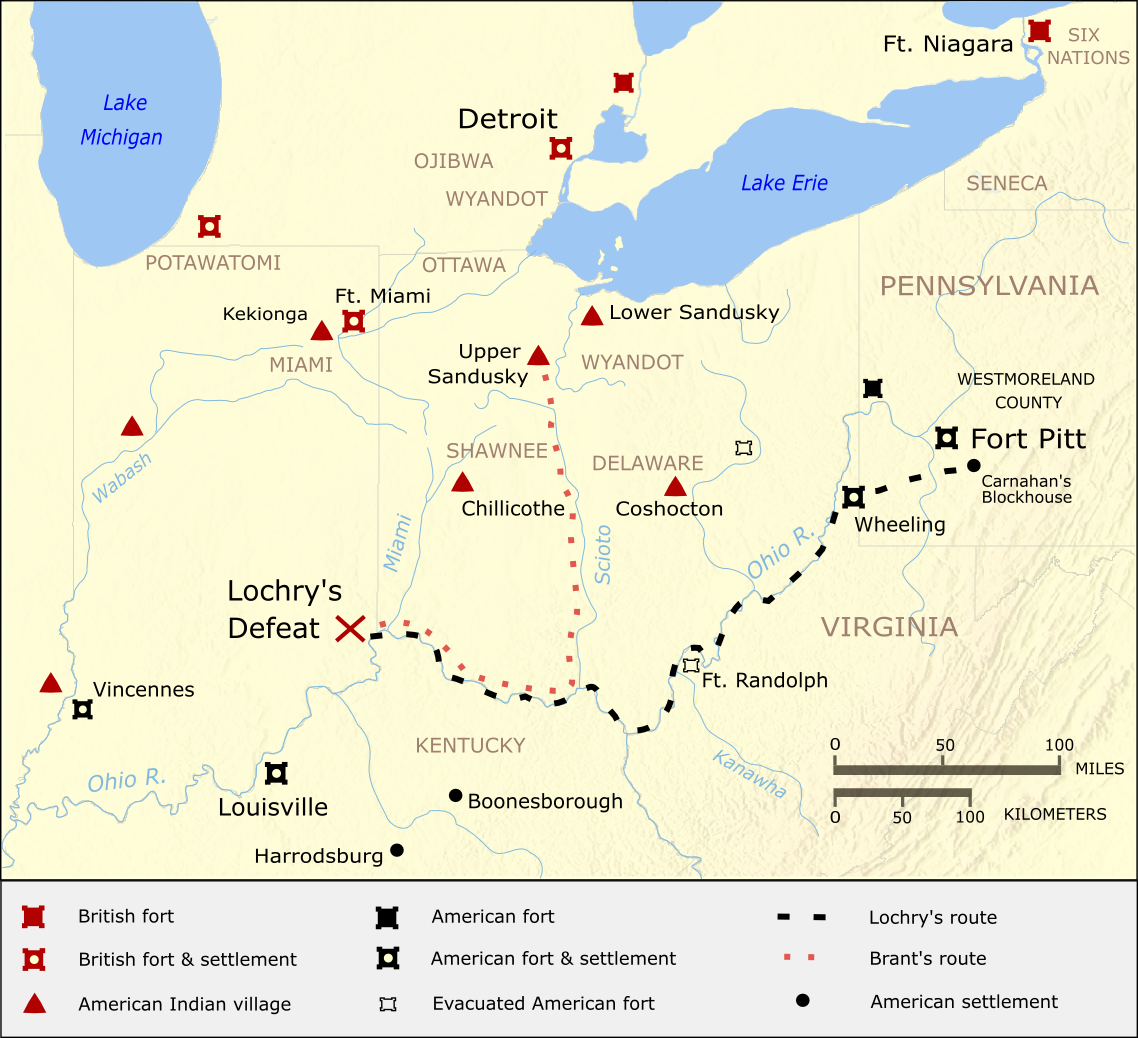
Lochry's and Brant's routes to the battle. Not all settlements are shown.

In early August, Clark moved his troops by boat down the Ohio River to Wheeling, where he was to rendezvous with Lochry and his men. After waiting five days longer than planned, Clark decided to leave Wheeling without Lochry because men were deserting the expedition, and Clark believed that if he got them further away from home, they would be less inclined to run off. When Lochry finally reached Wheeling on August 8, he found that Clark had departed only a few hours earlier. Lochry sent the following message to Clark:

My dear General. I arrived at this Post this moment. I find that there is neither Boats, provisions or ammunition left. I have sent a small canoe after you to know what is to be done. If you send back these articles mentioned and with directions where I will overtake you, I will follow. We are upwards of one hundred strong including Light Horse.

Writing from Middle Island on August 9, Clark replied to Lochry:

I am heartily sorry that after waiting so long for you I would set out but a day before your arrival.... I am exceeding unhappy at our not joining at Weelind [Wheeling], but don't know that either of us are to blame, the militia with us continue to desert, and consequently I cannot remain long in one place otherways should be happy in forming a junction here.... I shall move on slowly for the reasons before recited and you will use the greatest industry as you cannot possibly pass us without our knowledge. I have suffered much lately but you again encourage me.

After building boats, Lochry and his men set off from Wheeling, hoping to catch up with the main body of the expedition. Meanwhile, Clark left Major Charles Cracraft with provisions and a small group of men on Camp Three Island to await Lochry's arrival. Further down the Ohio, Clark stopped at the mouth of the Kanawha River, but again he decided to keep moving in order to prevent desertion. Clark left a letter fastened to a pole which instructed Lochry to keep following.

On August 14, Lochry wrote to Clark that his men were "in great spirits and determined to go where ordered", and that he had even apprehended 16 deserters from Clark's force and were bringing them along. The next day, Lochry found Major Cracraft on Camp Three Island. Cracraft turned over a large horse boat to Lochry, and then left by canoe to rejoin Clark's troops. The following day, on August 16, Lochry sent Captain Samuel Shannon and seven men with a letter to Clark. In the letter, Lochry asked Clark to leave more provisions because he was running short of flour and did not want to be delayed by having to send out hunters. Lochry sent two men out to hunt the next day, but they never returned.

== Ambush on the Ohio ==
On the night of August 18, Clark and his men floated past the mouth of the Great Miami River, near the present-day border between Ohio and Indiana. Brant's party was hidden on the northern bank of the Ohio, but with too few men to confront Clark's larger force, Brant remained silent and let Clark pass unhindered. This was a missed opportunity for the British and Indian war effort: had McKee and Simon Girty not been delayed while gathering reinforcements, they would have been able to ambush Clark, whom the Indians feared more than any other commander, at a moment when desertion had made him vulnerable. According to historian Randolph Downes, "Students of the life of George Rogers Clark have never sufficiently emphasized how close he and his expedition came to utter destruction as they descended the Ohio River in 1781."

Although he missed a chance to ambush Clark, Brant soon found another target. On August 21, Brant captured Major Cracraft and six men who were trying to catch up with Clark. Brant also captured a few men from Captain Shannon's detachment. From the letters his prisoners carried, Brant learned that Lochry's party was not far behind. Brant sent a letter to McKee, urging him to hurry because "whilst the enemy are scadred [scattered] we can easy manage them". Brant prepared to attack Lochry regardless of whether McKee's reinforcements arrived in time.

At about 8:00 a.m. on August 24, the day of the battle, Lochry's party landed on the northern bank of the Ohio River, near the mouth of a creek about 11 miles (18 km) below the mouth of the Great Miami. According to some brief accounts, Lochry was lured ashore in a ruse by Brant, who left captured Americans in sight and attacked after Lochry landed. According to more detailed accounts, Brant had planned this deception, but the Pennsylvanians happened to land a short distance upriver without having seen the captives. Nevertheless, Lochry's men came ashore close enough that Brant, who had not yet been reinforced by McKee, was still able to make his attack.

Although Lochry knew that he was in hostile territory, he landed his little flotilla after two days of nonstop travel because he needed to feed his men and horses. After landing, the Americans cooked fresh buffalo meat for breakfast and cut grass for their horses, apparently not taking proper security precautions. Concealed in the nearby woods, Brant repositioned his men and then opened fire, taking the Americans completely by surprise. Some Americans fought until their ammunition ran out, although others apparently did not have their weapons ready when the attack began. Some of the Americans attempted to escape by boat, but Brant had anticipated this and had positioned men in canoes to cut off any retreat. Seeing that he was hopelessly trapped, Lochry called for his men to surrender.

Although the two sides were about even in number, Brant had won a lopsided victory. All of the Americans were killed or captured; none of Brant's men were injured. According to a detailed list prepared by Brant and sent to Detroit, 37 Americans were killed and 64 were captured. Some of the American dead—some sources say most—had been executed after surrendering. This included Lochry, who was sitting on a log after the battle when a Shawnee warrior killed him with a tomahawk blow to the head. According to some accounts, Brant prevented the Indians from killing even more of the prisoners. The dead were scalped and left unburied.

== Aftermath ==
External images
- Indiana historical marker
- The same marker, with view of Laughery Creek

After the battle, the native warriors and rangers hesitated to close on Clark's main force. Brant marched the prisoners up the Miami River. On August 27, he rendezvoused with about 300 Indians led by McKee and about 100 Butler's Rangers led by Captain Andrew Thompson. Leaving a detachment to guard the prisoners, the combined Indian and British force of about 500 set off towards Fort Nelson in pursuit of Clark's main army. On September 9, two captured Americans revealed that Clark's expedition had been called off because of a shortage of men. Satisfied that the campaign had been successfully concluded, most of the British-Indian army dispersed, although McKee convinced 200 men to accompany him on a raid into Kentucky, which culminated in what Kentuckians called the "Long Run massacre".

The 64 American prisoners were divided between the tribes. A few of these prisoners were subsequently killed. As was their custom, the Indians took some of the prisoners home and ritually adopted them in order to replace fallen warriors. Most, however, were sold to the British in Detroit and then transferred to a prison in Montreal. A few managed to escape from captivity; the remainder were released after the war ended in 1783. Of the 100 or more men who had taken part in Lochry's expedition, the number who eventually made it back home has been estimated from "less than half" to "more than half".

Lochry's Defeat, as the battle generally came to be called in American history, was a devastating blow to the people of Westmoreland County. Nearly every home was affected. Residents of the county were alarmed at having lost so many of their most experienced soldiers at a time when they were needed to defend the frontier. On December 3, General William Irvine, the new commander at Fort Pitt, wrote to Joseph Reed:

I am sorry to inform your Excellency that this Country has got a severe stroke by the loss of Colonel Lochry and about one hundred (tis said) of the best men of Westmoreland County, including Captain Stockely & his Company of Rangers. They were going down the Ohio on General Clarke's Expedition, many accounts agree that they were all killed or taken at the mouth of the Miame [sic] River. I believe [they were] chiefly killed. This misfortune, added to the failure of General Clarke's Expedition, has filled the people with great dismay. Many talk of retiring to the East side of the Mountain early in the Spring. Indeed there is great reason to apprehend that the Savages, & perhaps the British from Detroit will push us hard in the Spring, and I believe there never were Posts—nor a Country—in a worse state of defence.

The loss of Lochry's detachment proved to be the fatal setback to Clark's 1781 campaign. In early September, Clark held a series of councils with Kentucky militia officers at Fort Nelson. Clark still advocated carrying out an expedition into the Ohio Country, saying that "I am ready to lead you on to any Action that has the most distant prospect of Advantage, however daring it may appear to be." Given the lateness of the season and the shortage of available men, the council overruled Clark and decided instead to remain on the defensive, although they proposed that another campaign against Detroit should be carried out the next year. On October 1, a disappointed Clark wrote, "My chain appears to have run out. I find myself enclosed with a few troops, in a trifling fort, and shortly expect to bear the insults of those who have for several years been in continual dread of me." Clark led an expedition against the Shawnee towns on the Great Miami River in 1782, one of the last actions of the war, but he was never able to mount an expedition against Detroit.

Sometime after Lochry's Defeat, Brant and Simon Girty got into an altercation along the Ohio River. According to contemporary gossip, Girty took exception to Brant's boasting about the success of the expedition, perhaps because Girty believed his brother George deserved more credit. The two men, who were reportedly drunk, came to blows, which ended when Brant slashed Girty in the head with his sword. The wound, which took several months to heal, left a scar on Girty's forehead. When Brant returned to Detroit in October, he had a sword cut on his leg, which had become infected and initially looked as if it would result in amputation. The wound was officially reported as accidentally self-inflicted, although gossipers said that it was the result of the fight with Girty. Brant's Iroquois companions returned home, but Brant was compelled to stay in Detroit over the winter in order to recover.
