= James Girty =

Interpreter and trader

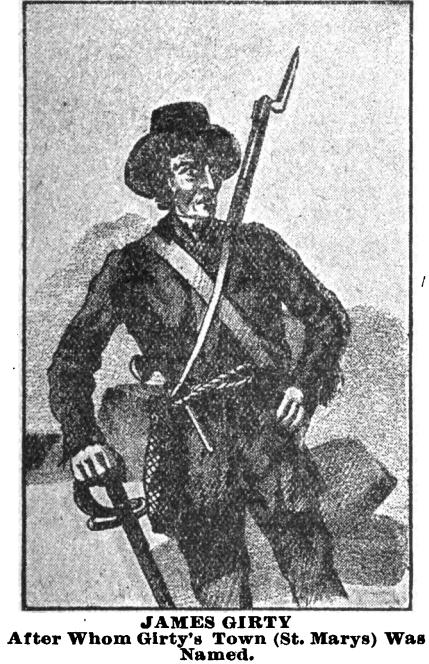

James Girty (1743–1817) was taken prisoner by the Shawnees and afterwards was an interpreter and trader.

== Biography ==
James Girty was the son of an Irish immigrant, Simon Girty (died 1751) and the younger brother of Simon Girty (1741–1818). The brothers were taken prisoners by the French and Native American force which in 1756 captured Fort Granville, in what is now Mifflin County, Pennsylvania. James was adopted by the Shawnees and lived among them for three years, after which he acted as an interpreter and trader; he frequently accompanied the Shawnees against the English settlers, and exhibited the greatest ferocity. He conducted a profitable trading business with Native Americans at Saint Marys, Ohio from 1783 to 1794, when he withdrew to Canada upon the approach of General Anthony Wayne, and again from 1795 until just before the War of 1812, when he again withdrew to Canada, where he died.
