= Crawford's Defeat by the Indians =

"Crawford’s Defeat by the Indians" is an early American folk ballad principally written by Doctor John Knight, survivor of the 1782 Crawford Expedition. The expedition was intended to destroy American Indian towns along the Sandusky River and was one of the final operations of the American Revolutionary War. The ballad "Crawford's Defeat" contains a great deal more history than poetry, however. It was long after a favorite song upon the frontier and was sung to various tunes. In fact, Doctor Knight's narrative was an immediate success. Its depiction of a brave officer's death at the hands of fiendish savages drew wide admiration and scenes of a rolling landscape delighted eastern land speculators. Though a year elapsed before Indian Atrocities: Narratives of the Perils and Sufferings of Dr. Knight and John Slover was printed, the delay apparently did nothing to reduce its appeal. If anything, the delay probably increased public interest, for all the while the ballad "Crawford's Defeat" was being sung. Another ballad, titled "Saint Clair's Defeat", was later based on "Crawford's Defeat". It depicts the Battle of the Wabash, which was fought on November 4, 1791, in the Northwest Territory between the United States and the Western Confederacy of American Indians.

"Crawford’s Defeat by the Indians" (1791 Reprint)

== History ==
Although news of the defeat raced across the frontier, the inclusion of lesser-known facts supports the notion that the western frontier was the place of origin, and that "Crawford’s Defeat" would have circulated in manuscript, and possibly song form until it caught the attention of a printer. If the ballad was printed before July 1786, the printing would have had to occur east of Pittsburgh, since that area lacked a press until then.

Actually, several individuals have been credited with composing the ballad. According to David Williamson's daughter, William McComb wrote "Crawford’s Defeat". Then again, a volunteer by the name of William Robinson believed that Major Thomas Gaddis composed part of the ballad. Most persistent, however, is the belief that Dr. John Knight wrote the ballad.

Nevertheless, "Crawford’s Defeat" may have been edited by a balladeer knowledgeable in the structure and characteristics of eighteenth-century composition. For instance, the ballad includes several clichés that were common in popular literature at the time, among them, "come all ye good people", and "I make no great doubt".

As for what tune, or tunes, "Crawford’s Defeat" was originally performed to, that is impossible to determine unless a broadside were to surface with the melody indicated. Even so, we could only be sure of one tune to which the ballad was sung. Still, the meter is a common one, and there are many tunes that would fit nicely with the words. Based on the rhythm of the lyric, "Crawford’s Defeat" could very easily be contained in a 3/4 or 6/8 time signature. In his Historical Account of the Expedition Against Sandusky, Consul Willshire Butterfield indicates that the vast majority of the volunteers were of Scotch-Irish descent. Thus, it is likely that whatever tune "Crawford’s Defeat" was originally performed to was a popular Scottish or Irish folk song; for instance, a song such as "Last May A Braw Wooer", "Kellyburn Braes", "Bonnie Dundee", "Bonnie Strathyre", or even "Believe Me If All Those Endearing Young Charms".

According to Pennsylvania folklorist Samuel Preston Bayard, when "Crawford’s Defeat" was first issued, it might have undergone oral variations, depending on who it was exposed to. Local loyalty, differing information, misunderstanding, and textual corruption may have been factors in its alteration.

For example, "A Song on the Death of Colonel Crafford" is one of a collection of ballads gathered by Mary Olive Eddy of Perrysville, Ashland County, Ohio. This abbreviated version of "Crawford's Defeat" was obtained from a school copybook dated approximately 1822. It is only nineteen stanzas long.

Another version of the ballad, entitled "Crawford's Defeat", is included by Frank Cowan in his "Southwestern Pennsylvania in Song and Story". This version, with twenty-four stanzas, was supplied to Cowan by the historian C. W. Butterfield, who, in turn, got it from Robert A. Sherrard, the son of a Crawford volunteer by the name of John Sherrard. A new stanza was inserted, with the intention of honoring local heroes:

They were Sherrard and Rogers and Paull of renown
They marched with Crawford to the Sandusky town
Where they bravely did fight till the battle was done
And without a scar they returned safely home

Other portions of "Crawford’s Defeat" can be found in the Draper Manuscript Collection at the Wisconsin Historical Society. Among his letters and interview notes are five fragments varying in length from one to fourteen stanzas. These fragments are significant in terms of what they reveal regarding the progressive alteration which occurred as some stanzas were forgotten or left out, others stitched together, and wholly new verses composed. Further illustrating such changes is the "old song" recalled by Stephen Burkarn, a Crawford volunteer, in 1845.

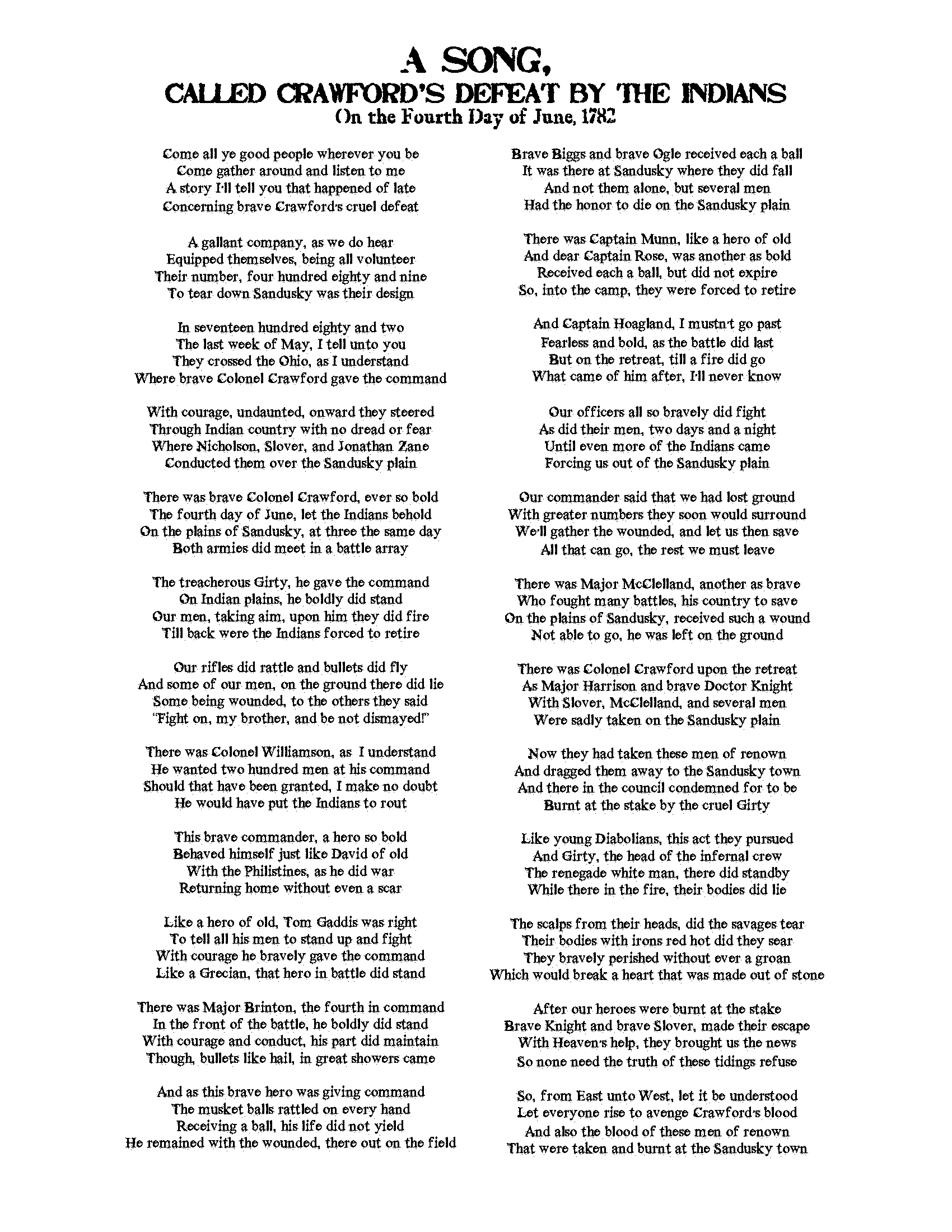
Crawford's Defeat by the Indians (230th Anniversary Commemorative Edition)

Gentlemen, gentlemen, listen to me
Our late expedition you quickly shall see
We went to fight Mingoes but before we had done
The English, the Tories, the Shawnees came on

We crossed the Ohio as you understand
With brave Colonel Crawford, who took the command
He marched away in May, eighty-two
Of brave volunteers, their number was few

Our number, four hundred, eighty and nine
To take the Sandusky it was our design
When only three Indians to us did appear
They never murmured their journey was hard and severe

And they were a great way in their enemies land
But still, we marched on with our small chosen band
Till we came to the plains, that beautiful place
Where we met with the Indians, a vile Tory race

They thought to surround us and kill us all there
But they were mistaken, most of us got dear
Our battle began on the Fourth day of June
About two o’clock in the afternoon

We fought them till dark, till we could no more see
Our killed and wounded were twenty and three
But they did not fight us so hard the next day
They were carrying their dead and wounded away

We killed three to one, it was always agreed
But now we must try for the road with all speed

The tendency to remake the ballad is also recognized in a fragment recited to Draper in 1863 by Elizabeth Willis of Brown County, Ohio, who was the daughter of a Crawford volunteer by the name of John Gunsaulus. Evidently, in the heat of battle, Gunsaulus sat down on a log and sang a song until his gun cooled off. Mrs. Willis remembered a few lines about her father:

As for John Gunsaulus, he fought like a man
In the midst of the battle he sat down to sing
There was our brave little Jack
With a red coat and hairy cap

In view of such alterations, deletions, and additions, it is not surprising that the ballad was remembered as longer than the twenty-four stanzas. One of Draper's informants recalled the song as having thirty-two stanzas. Another claimed that it had sixty-two!

Broadsides of "Crawford's Defeat" can be found in the collections of the College of William and Mary, University of Arizona, Brown University, University of Delaware, Fordham University, Northern Illinois University, and the American Antiquarian Society of Worcester, Massachusetts. The most widely circulated edition of "Crawford's Defeat" was presumably published as a reprint in late 1791 or early 1792, given that it was printed on the same broadside as another ballad, titled "St. Clair’s Defeat, a New Song", about a battle fought in November 1791. In general, eighteenth-century ballads were turned out as quickly as possible and sold to printers in order to capitalize on the public's interest in the sensational. Printers then arranged for ballads to be sold throughout the surrounding region by peddlers who typically shared in the profits.

In the third stanza of the above-mentioned reprint, the year given is right. However, the date is occasionally incorrect. The army actually crossed the Ohio River on Friday, May 24, 1782, and elected its officers, the volunteers distributing themselves into eighteen companies. The following morning the army started west.

The tenth stanza mentions "brave Major Light", which may have been a typo. Although there is no record of a Major Light, there is certainly evidence of Major Daniel Leet's participation. Another common variant mentions Major Thomas Gaddis, third in command:

Like a hero of old, Tom Gaddis was right
To tell all his men to stand up and fight
With courage he bravely gave the command
Like a Grecian, that hero in battle did stand

Stanza Fourteen also contains a typo. "Captain Rase" is actually a reference to Captain Ezekiel Rose. It is not entirely unlikely that the author may have been referring to Gustavus Heinrich de Rosenthal, who served under the name "John Rose". However, Rosenthal was elected adjutant with the rank of Major, not Captain. Ironically, Cowan's "Southwestern Pennsylvania in Song and Story" contains yet another typo. It incorrectly lists a "Captain Ross" instead of Captain Rose.

According to the testimony of Private John Clark of Ohio County, West Virginia, the manner of Captain John Hoagland's death was as pictured in the ballad. Clark states that he and Hoagland with two other soldiers became separated from the retreating army, and at night saw a distant campfire. They debated as to whether to approach or avoid it. Finally Hoagland, despite warnings, went to the fire and was immediately shot.

Stanza Seventeen incorrectly states "all that’s able to go, the rest we must leave". Crawford's orders specified that the wounded were to be transported, either on horseback or by bier. None were to be left behind on the retreat, which began after dark on the night of June 5.

The spelling of the last name "Majaster" in the eighteenth stanza is also a printer's error. While an Ensign McMasters appears to have participated in the Battle of Sandusky, documentation of this soldier's fighting "many battles his country to save", has yet to be uncovered. Major John B. McClelland's service records, on the other hand, provide grounds for another variation:

There was Major McClelland, another as brave
Who fought many battles, his country to save
On the plains of Sandusky, received such a wound
Not able to go, he was left on the ground

As indicated, McClelland was wounded and fell from his horse. Several of the men who were part of the expedition said that on the retreat, the horsemen rode over McClelland, and it was the general belief that he was killed where he fell. Such, however, was not the case. As indicated in the following verse, Crawford and Knight were captured, and Slover soon afterward. As for McClelland and Harrison, their tortured corpses were recognized by Slover when he was captured and taken to the Shawnee village of Wapatomika.

"Crawford's Defeat" effectively encouraged a patriotic fervor. In fact, the resentment of western settlers toward eastern politicians was considerable, and not without cause. Amid the bloodshed of indiscriminate Indian raids, appeals to Philadelphia for regular troops failed to bring significant reinforcements; the feeble response from the seaboard continuing until the slaughter of Arthur St. Clair's army in 1791, which finally jolted President Washington to take action.

== Recordings ==
The only known recording of "Crawford’s Defeat by the Indians" was performed by Jaclyn Bradley Palmer and Ceud Mìle Fàilte in preparation for the 230th anniversary of the Crawford Expedition. It is based on the familiar melody of "Bonnie Dundee" and includes a brief interlude, "Fortune Favours the Strong", written by Paul Kirk, who plays fiddle on the recording. Other musicians that performed on "Crawford’s Defeat by the Indians" include Elizabeth Crowe, who plays cello and spoons; John McClellan, a descendant of John B. McClelland and Thomas Gaddis, who plays guitar and percussion; Jaclyn Bradley Palmer who performs vocals; Vincent Polowy, who plays guitar and six-string banjo; Erica Tompkins, who plays fiddle and bodhrán; and Julie Wesolek, who plays tin whistle and piccolo. "Crawford’s Defeat by the Indians" was produced by John McClellan and Bryan Patrick and was recorded, mixed, and mastered by Bryan Patrick for Jungle Recording Studio, Lorain, Ohio.

== Lyrics ==
Come all you good people wherever you be
Pray draw near a while and listen to me
A story I’ll tell you which happened of late
Concerning brave Crawford’s most cruel defeat

A bold hearted company, as we do hear
Equipped themselves, being all volunteer
Their number four hundred and eighty and nine
To take the Sandusky town was their design

In seventeen hundred eighty and two
The twenty-sixth of May, I tell unto you
They crossed the Ohio, as I understand
Where brave Colonel Crawford, he gave the command

With courage undaunted, away they did steer
Through the Indian country without dread or fear
Where Nicholson, Slover, and Jonathan Zane
Conducted them to the Sandusky plain

Now brave Colonel Crawford, an officer bold
On the fifth day of June, did the Indians behold
On the plains of Sandusky, at three the same day
Both armies did meet in a battle array

The Indians on horseback, Girty gave the command
On the side of the plains, they boldly did stand
Our men, like brave heroes, upon them did fire
Until backward the Indians were forced to retire

Our rifles did rattle and bullets did fly
And some of our men, on the ground there did lie
And some being wounded, to comrades they said
"Fight on, brother soldiers, and be not dismayed!"

Then brave Colonel Williamson, as I understand
He wanted two hundred men at his command
If the same had been granted, I make no great doubt
That he soon would have put the proud Indians to rout

For this brave commander, like a hero so bold
Behaved with courage, like David of old
Who with the Philistines, he used to war
And returned safe home without receiving a scar

There was brave Major Brinton, the first in command
In the front of the battle he boldly did stand
With courage and conduct, his part did maintain
Though, bullets like hail, in great showers they came

And as this brave here was giving command
The rifle balls rattled on every hand
He received a ball, but his life did not yield
He remained with the wounded men, out on the field

Brave Biggs and brave Ogle received each a ball
On the plains of Sandusky, it was their lot to fall
And not these alone, but several men
Had the honor to die on the Sandusky plain

There was brave Captain Munn, like a hero of old
Likewise, Captain Ross, who was another as bold
Received each a ball but did not expire
Though into the camp, they were forced to retire

There was brave Captain Hoagland, I must not go past
He fought out and bravely while the battle did last
And on the retreat, to a fire did he go
What became of him after, we never could know

There was Major McClelland, another as brave
He fought many battles, his country to save
On the plains of Sandusky, he received a wound
Not being able to go, he was left on the ground

There were Sherrard and Rogers, with Paull of renown
They marched with Crawford, to the Sandusky town
Where they bravely did fight, till the battle was done
And without a scar they returned safe home

Our officers all so bravely did fight
And likewise, our men, two days and a night
Until a reinforcement of Indians there came
Which caused us to leave the Sandusky plain

Then said our commander, since we have lost ground
By superior numbers they do us surround
We’ll gather the wounded men, and let us save
All that’s able to go, and the rest we must leave

There was brave Colonel Crawford upon the retreat
Likewise Major Harrison and brave Doctor Knight
With Slover, McClelland, and several men
Were unfortunately taken on the Sandusky plain

Well, now they have taken these men of renown
And dragged them away to the Sandusky town
And there in their council condemned for to be
Burnt at the stake by most cruel Girty

Like young Diabolians, this act they pursued
And Girty, the head of the infernal crew
This renegade white man was a stander-by
While there in the fire, their bodies did fry

The scalps from their heads, while alive they did tear
Their bodies with red hot irons, they did sear
They bravely expired without ever a groan
Which might melt a heart that was harder than stone

After our heroes were burnt at the stake
Brave Knight and brave Slover, they made their escape
And with Heaven’s assistance, they brought us the news
So none, need the truth of these tidings refuse

Now, from East unto West, let it be understood
Let everyone arise to revenge Crawford’s blood
And likewise, the blood of these men of renown
That were taken and burnt at the Sandusky town

== See also ==
Crawford expedition
