= John McClelland (soldier) =

John McClelland (1766–1849) was an officer in the War of 1812. He was the son of American Revolutionary War officer Lieutenant-Colonel John B. McClelland, who was a casualty of Colonel Crawford's ill-fated Sandusky Expedition.

== Early life ==
McClelland was born in September 1766 in Cumberland County, Pennsylvania (later to become Bedford, afterward Westmoreland, and finally Fayette County) to Lt. Colonel John B. McClelland (1734–1782) and Martha Dale (1741–1822), near the Brown Settlement at Redstone Creek, which was referred to as Union Township at the time. He married Rachel Orr (1770–1843) in 1787.

Like his father and his older brothers Hugh and Alexander, John actively participated in the American Revolutionary War. In 1781, at the age of fifteen, McClelland (sometimes spelled "McClellan") enlisted at Guilford Township (now Franklin County, Pennsylvania) in the Eighth Company of the First Battalion of Cumberland County Militia, commanded by Colonel James Johnston; 6th Class, reporting to Captain James Young.

== Whiskey Rebellion ==
During the early 1790s, John McClelland took part in the Whiskey Rebellion, as a member of the "Whiskey Boys", a group of citizens who were infuriated that Congress had imposed a biased tax on whiskey, intended to pay back government bond holders. While smaller distilleries were to pay taxes by the gallon, larger distillers could take advantage of a flat fee, putting the smaller distilleries at an obvious disadvantage. Their discontent stemmed from factors similar to that which characterized their experience leading up to the Revolutionary War: a sense of isolation and alienation from government authorities that failed to consider their needs and interests.

The excise tax, passed in July 1791, placed a considerable burden on western farmers who converted excess grain into whiskey, which was easier to transport and much more marketable. Despite continued petitions from western counties, Congress refused to repeal the tax and westerners reacted by ignoring the tax, harassing tax collectors, destroying property, and raising liberty poles.

A meeting of key residents of the western counties of Pennsylvania, the proceedings of which plainly indicated that the feeling of opposition had intensified, took place on August 21 and 22, 1794. The following delegates were present: John Canon, William Wallace, Shesbazer Bentley, Benjamin Parkison, John Huey, John Badollet, John Hamilton, Neal Gillespie, David Bradford, Rev. David Phillips, Matthew Jamison, James Marshel, James Robinson, James Stewart, Robert McClure, Peter Lyle, Alexander Long, Samuel Wilson, Edward Cook, Albert Gallatin, John Smilie, Bazil Bowel, Thomas Gaddis, and John McClellan.

In July 1794, approximately 7,000 local militiamen marched on Pittsburgh, whose citizens they believed supported the tax. The mob banished several of the townspeople and news of the uprising prompted George Washington to raise a 15,000-man force to march on Western Pennsylvania.

McClelland, serving as Chair of the committee, attempted to reconcile by submitting the following appeal on September 1, 1794.

Gentleman,

The committee appointed by the Committee of Safety at Redstone, the 28th August last, to confer with the commissioners of the United States and State of Pennsylvania, and agreeable to the resolution of the said committee do request

1st.) That the said commissioners do give an assurance on the part of the general government to an indemnity to all persons as to the arrearage of excise, that have not entered their stills to this date.

2nd.) Will the Commissioners, aforesaid, give to the eleventh day of October next, to take the sense of the people at large, of the four counties west of Pennsylvania, and that part of Bedford west of the Allegheny Mountains, and the Ohio County in Virginia, whether they will accede to the resolution of the said commissioners as stated at large, in the conference, with the committee of conference met at Pittsburgh the 21st day of August last?

By order of the Committee,

John McClelland

Washington's troops didn't reach Pittsburgh until October, however, and the rebel army had already dispersed. Federal officers arrested 150 men they identified as being involved in the rebellion. Of these, twenty-four were taken to Philadelphia for trial, but only two were convicted. Nevertheless, they were then given presidential pardons due to their exceptional service throughout the American Revolutionary War.

== War of 1812 ==
John A McClelland served as Captain of a company of volunteer light dragoons, who entered 12 months of Federal service in October 1812. They were attached to Major James V Ball's Squadron of regular United States Light Dragoons and served throughout the campaigns of 1812 and 1813 in the Northwestern frontier, including the Battle of Mississinewa, the Siege of Fort Meigs, and a skirmish near Fort Stephenson in July 1813. The company along with the rest of Ball's light dragoons was dismounted and served as light infantry during the landing of Major General William Henry Harrison's army at Malden and the recapture of Detroit in October 1813. McClelland's company was discharged after the Battle of the Thames, on October 21, 1813.

== Later life ==
Although he operated a general store prior to the war, and owned property in Monongalia County, Virginia (now West Virginia), John McClelland lived in Uniontown with his wife Rachel, daughter Sarah (1786–1826), and son Andrew (1797–1868) on his farm near Morgantown Road, for nearly thirty years after the war. He died August 15, 1849, in Georges Township, Fayette County, Pennsylvania and is buried at Tent Presbyterian Cemetery (275 Tent Church Road, Uniontown, Pennsylvania 15401).
