= James Brenton (soldier) =

James Brenton, Sr
- Born: February 2, 1741; Frederick County, Virginia (now Hampshire County, West Virginia)
- Died: August 19, 1782; Kentucky County, Virginia (now Robertson County, Kentucky)
- Cause of death: Killed in action

James Brenton Sr (1741–1782) was an American Revolutionary War officer. He was killed by Native Americans during the Battle of Blue Licks in Robertson County, Kentucky (then Kentucky County, Virginia). He married Rebecca Scott (1740–1771) abt. 1763 in Frederick County, Virginia, and then married Mary Woodfield (1750–1834) in 1772, Westmoreland County, Pennsylvania.

== Background ==
In 1768, James traveled over the Allegheny Mountains to Westmoreland County (now Washington County), Pennsylvania, where he settled near the Monongahela River, neighboring Redstone Old Fort (now Brownsville, Fayette County, Pennsylvania). It's likely that James and his brother William helped build Williams Cabin near Old Bedford Village, in Bedford County, Pennsylvania.

In 1774, Brenton was commissioned a Captain by Colonel Angus McDonald, who mustered roughly 400 men to take part in the Wakatomica Campaign of Dunmore's War. The Shawnee settlements of Wakatomika (present day Dresden, Muskingum County, Ohio) as well as four other villages were burned. Three American Indian Chiefs were taken prisoner.

In 1777, he defended the frontier, serving as a First Lieutenant in the Virginia Rangers of Monongalia County. In 1779, he was promoted to Captain, and then to Major by Patrick Henry.

Later that year, James and his family relocated to Harrodsburg, Kentucky County, Virginia (now Mercer County, Kentucky). They spent the winter in Harrodsburg, and in spring of 1780 settled on the south bank of Clarks Creek at the ford northeast of Danville (now Boyle County, Kentucky).

In 1782, Brenton was commissioned a Major and made fifth in command of the Crawford Expedition, intended to put an end to Indian attacks on frontier settlers. James Brenton (occasionally misspelled "Brinton") was one of four majors elected for the expedition. The other Majors included David Williamson, Thomas Gaddis, and John McClelland.

According to Consul Willshire Butterfield, Major Brenton, "was a man of much spirit – a soldier, brave and active. Judging of his merits by his subsequent conduct, he unquestionably commanded the esteem as well as the confidence of the volunteers. His coolness and bravery in the face of imminent danger were long after alluded to by his surviving comrades, in terms of the highest commendation."

Major Brinton and Captain Bean were also scouts; observing two savages, upon whom they immediately fired, though without effect. Brenton was wounded at the Battle of Sandusky and Daniel Leet subsequently took command of his division.

== Crawford's defeat by the Indians ==
The song, "Crawford's Defeat by the Indians" mentions Major Brenton:

There was brave Major Brinton, the first in command
In the front of the battle he boldly did stand
With courage and conduct, his part did maintain
Though, bullets like hail, in great showers they came

And as this brave here was giving command
The rifle balls rattled on every hand
He received a ball, but his life did not yield
He remained with the wounded men, out on the field

Shortly after returning from the Crawford Expedition, Brenton was mortally wounded at the Battle of Blue Licks on August 19, 1782. One of the last battles of the American Revolutionary War, Blue Licks took place near the Licking River, in what is now Robertson County, Kentucky (but was then Kentucky County, Virginia). Approximately 50 Loyalists and 300 American Indians ambushed 182 frontier militiamen.

James' son, also named James, was in the party which buried the dead after the Battle of Blue Licks. According to family legend, James brought his father's body back to Harrodsburg for burial.

== Bibliography ==
- Brown, Parker B. "'Crawford's Defeat': A Ballad." Western Pennsylvania Historical Magazine 64 (March 1981): 311–327.
- Brown, Parker B. "Reconstructing Crawford's Army of 1782". Western Pennsylvania Historical Magazine 65 (January 1982): 17–36.
- Brown, Parker B. "The Battle of Sandusky: June 4–6, 1782". Western Pennsylvania Historical Magazine 65 (April 1982): 115–151.
- Brown, Parker B. "The Fate of Crawford Volunteers Captured by Indians Following the Battle of Sandusky in 1782". Western Pennsylvania Historical Magazine 65 (October 1982): 323–39.
- Butterfield, Consul Willshire (1873). An Historical Account of the Expedition Against Sandusky Under Col. William Crawford in 1782. R. Clarke & Co.
- Brenton, Chester Fay. "American descendants of Magistrate Brenton of Hammersmith, England." London, England . C.F. Brenton, 1997. Page 44.
- De Rosenthal, Gustavus. Journal of a Volunteer Expedition to Sandusky: From May 24 to June 13, 1782. Ayer Co Pub, 1969.
- Gwathmey, John H. "Historical Register of Virginians in the Revolution, Vol. 1: Soldiers, Sailors, Marines, 1775-1783". Richmond, VA. 1938. Page 91.
- Kentucky Historical Society. Genealogical Committee. "Kentucky Ancestors: Volumes 27-28". Kentucky Historical Society. 1991
- Reid, Darren R. "Daniel Boone and Others on the Kentucky Frontier: Autobiographies and Narratives, 1769-1795". McFarland, 2009. Page 148.
- Reuben Gold Thwaites & Louise Phelps Kellogg. "Frontier Defense on the Upper Ohio, 1777-1778: Compiled From the Draper Manuscripts in the Library of the Wisconsin Historical Society". State Historical Society of Wisconsin, 1912. Pages 84, 216–217.
- Virginia Revolutionary Pension Applications: Abstracted, Volumes 11–14. 1965.
- Washington, Irvine, & Butterfield. "Washington-Irvine Correspondence: The Official Letters Which Passed Between Washington And William Irvine". David Atwood, 1882. Pages 122, 365.
- Withers, Alexander Scott. "Chronicles of Border Warfare; a History of the Settlement by the Whites". Reuben Gold Thwaites. 2006. Page 328.
