= Elizabeth Willis (disambiguation) =

Elizabeth Willis (born 1961) is an American poet and literary critic.

Elizabeth Willis (or variants) may also refer to:

- Elizabeth Willis (actress) (1669–1739), British stage actress
- Elizabeth Willis DeHuff (1886–1983), American painter and writer
- Betty Willis (artist) (1923–2015), visual artist and graphic designer
- Betty Willis (singer) (1941-2018), American soul singer
- Elizabeth Willis, see Crawford's Defeat by the Indians
- Liz Willis, presenter on WYMG
- Lizzie Ida Grace Willis (1881–1968), NZ military nurse

== See also ==
- Beth Willis (disambiguation), multiple uses
- Willis (surname)
