= Fort Gaddis =

- Thomas Gaddis Homestead
- U.S. National Register of Historic Places
- Pennsylvania state historical marker
- Thomas Gaddis House (Exterior)

- Location within Pennsylvania Location within the United States
- Location: South of Uniontown off U.S. Route 119, South Union Township, Pennsylvania
- Coordinates: 39°52′2″N 79°44′39″W
- Area: 2 acres (0.81 ha)
- Built: 1798
- NRHP reference No.: 74001782

Significant dates
- Added to NRHP: April 26, 1974
- Designated PHMC: November 23, 1946

Fort Gaddis is the oldest known building in Fayette County, Pennsylvania, and the second oldest log cabin in Western Pennsylvania. It is located 300 yards (270 meters) east of the old U.S. Route 119, near the Route 857 intersection of South Union Township, Pennsylvania (east of Hopwood and south of Uniontown). Fort Gaddis was constructed between 1769 and 1774 by Colonel Thomas Gaddis, who handled the defense of the region; therefore, it is likely that his house was chosen as a location for community gatherings and emergency shelter, hence the name "Fort Gaddis", most likely a 19th-century appellation. It is a 1½-story, one-room log building and is 26 feet wide and 20 feet long.

During the Whiskey Rebellion, a Liberty Pole was erected at the house during a rally in support of the rebel cause. The choice of this site for a political demonstration indicates its importance as a focal point for community expression. The fact that all the additions to the building were removed in the early twentieth century in respect for the section contemporary with the American Revolution and Whiskey Rebellion is evidence of the building's longstanding and continuing status and power as a community symbol.

Fort Gaddis was built near the Catawba Trail, an important north-south route that extended from New York to Tennessee and passed through Uniontown, Pennsylvania, and Morgantown, West Virginia. In the 19th century the trail became locally known as the Morgantown Road. It is now Old U.S. Route 119. About 2 miles north on this road is Uniontown, the Fayette County, Pennsylvania seat, settled in the late 1760s and founded in July 1776 as Beeson's Mill.

It was added to the National Register of Historic Places in 1974 as the Thomas Gaddis Homestead.

History enthusiasts and researchers should be informed that Fort Gaddis can also be referred to as the "Thomas Gaddis Homestead", the "Thomas Gaddis House", or "Gaddis' Fort".

== Gallery ==
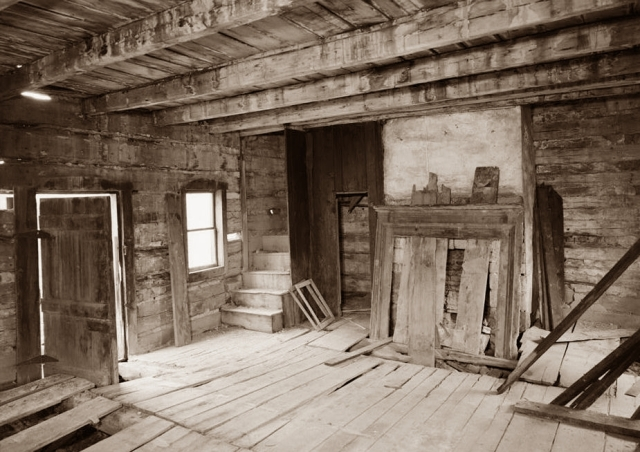
Thomas Gaddis House (interior)

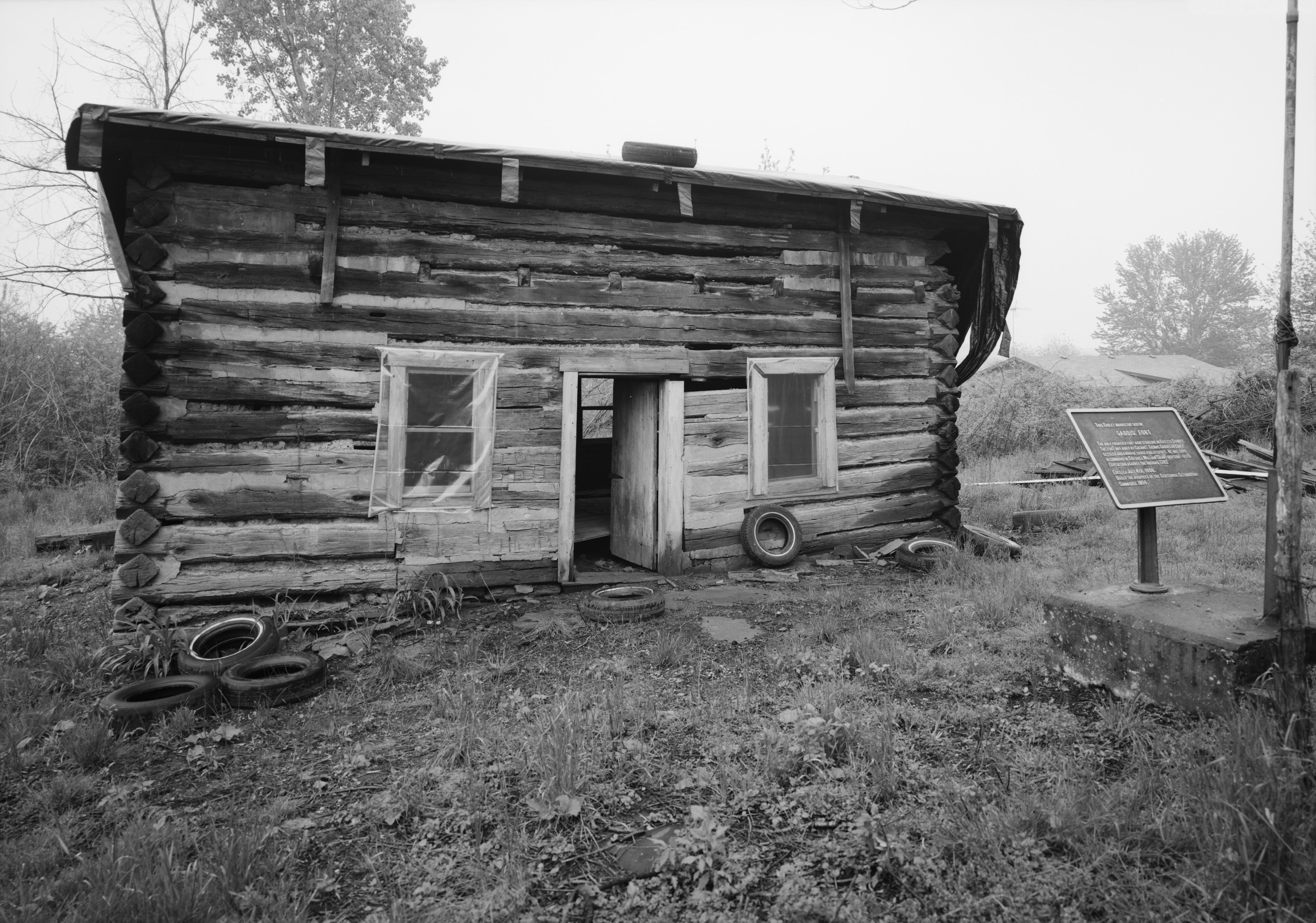
Photo taken during c. 1989 restoration

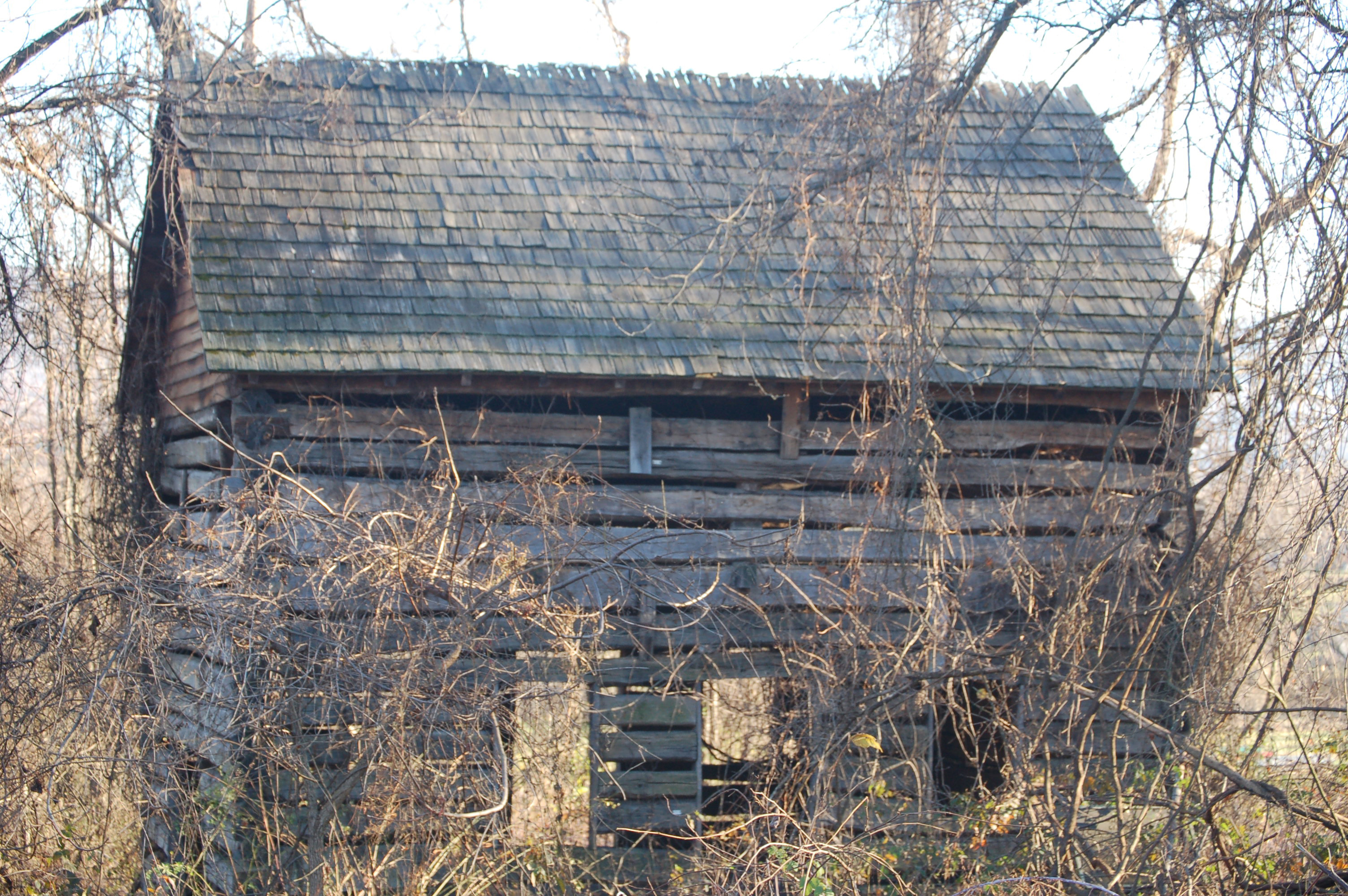
Photo taken in 2012

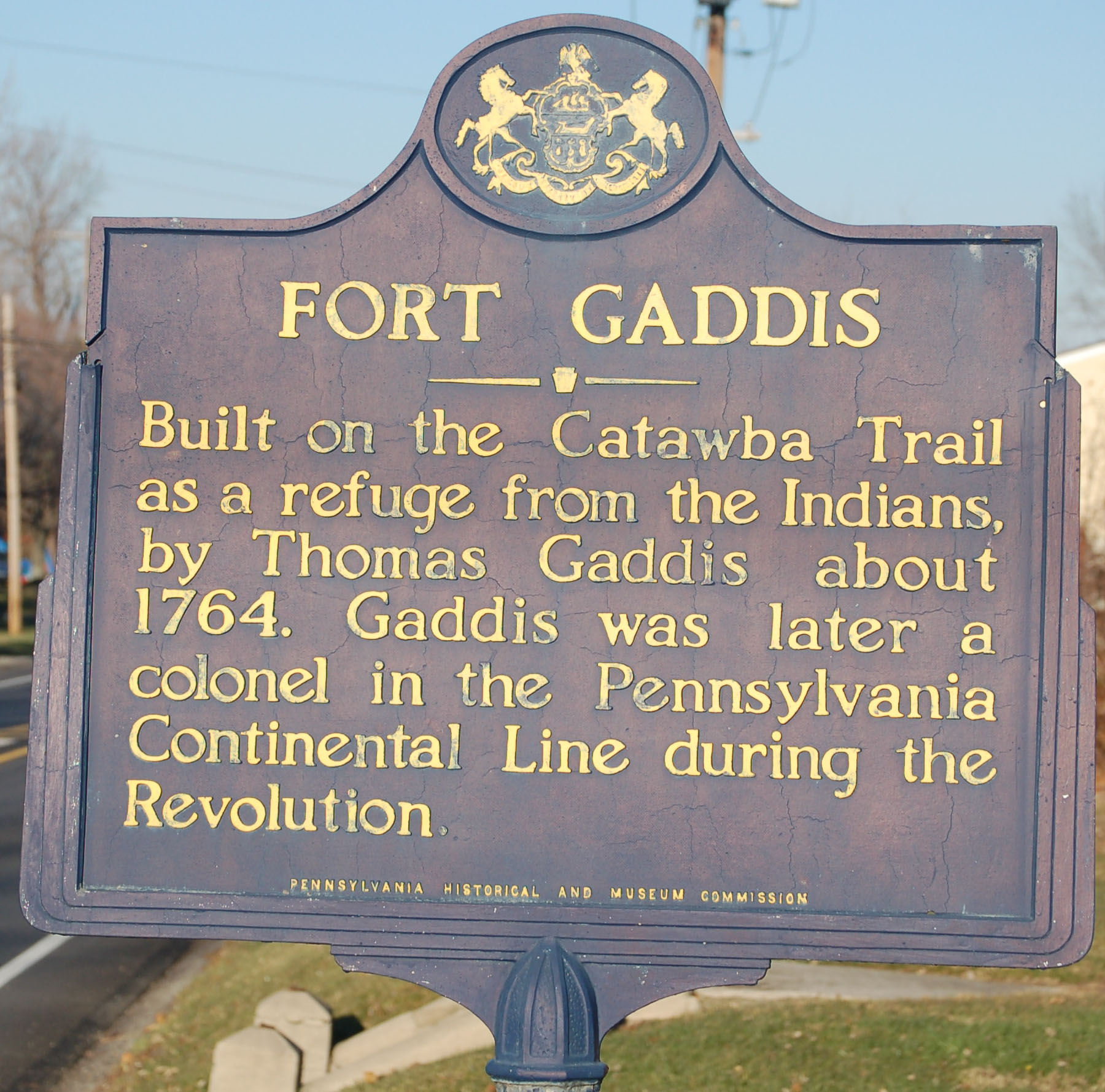
Road marker
