= Vaimõisa =

Village in Estonia

Coordinates: 58°59′N 24°28′E

- Village
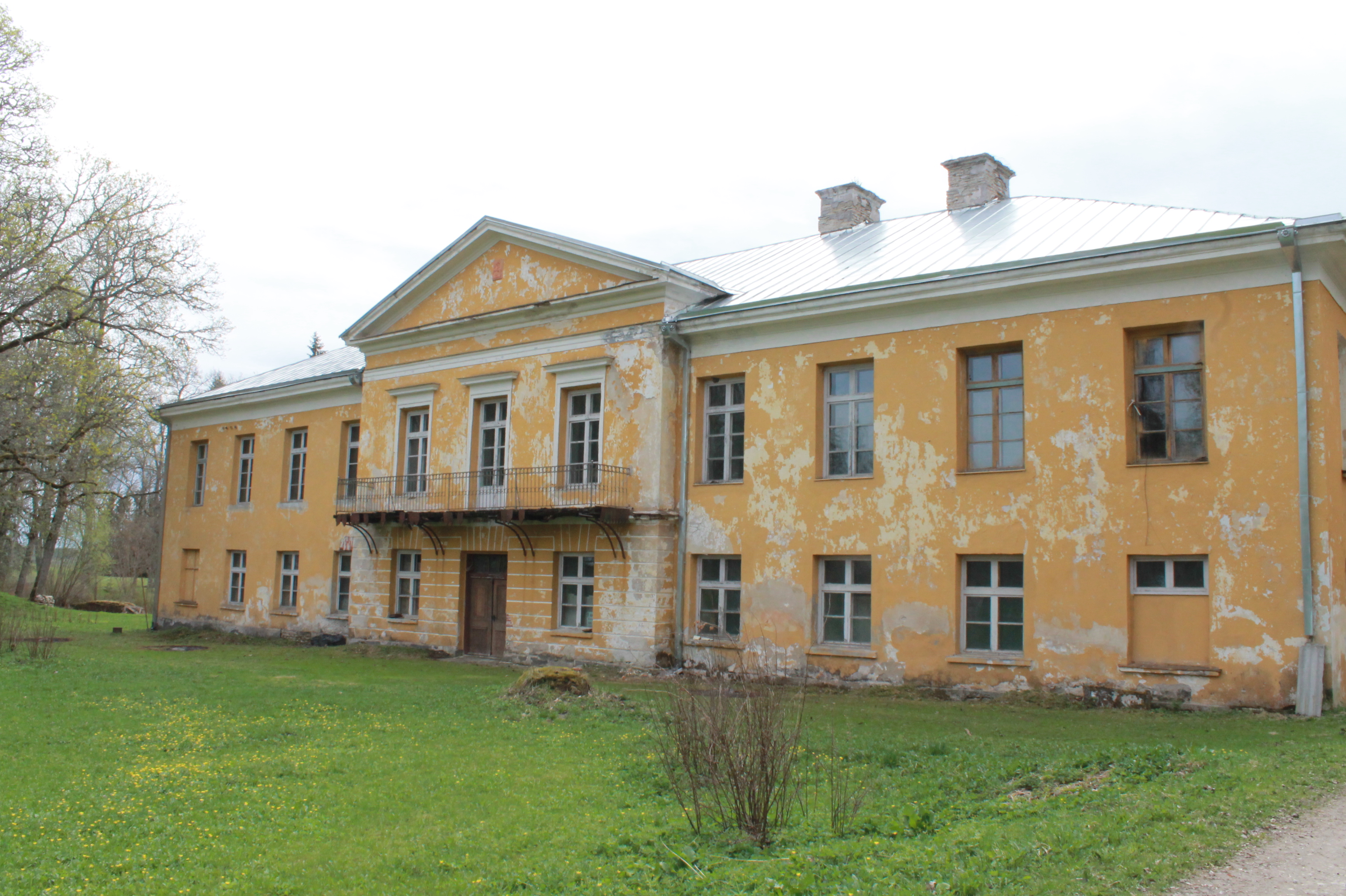
- Vaimõisa manor house
- Interactive map of Vaimõisa
- Country: Estonia
- County: Rapla County
- Parish: Märjamaa Parish
- Time zone: UTC+2 (EET)
  - Summer (DST): UTC+3 (EEST)

Vaimõisa (German: Waddemois) is a village in Märjamaa Parish, Rapla County in western Estonia.

== Vaimõisa manor ==
Vaimõisa as a landed estate has existed at least since 1494, but the first manor house was probably destroyed during the Livonian War. The first estate was established by a bailiff serving under Bishopric of Ösel-Wiek. Throughout the centuries, the estate belonged to several Baltic German families, including the Farensbach, Flemming, Nascakin, Wetter-Rosenthal, Baranoff and Wilcken family. Among more illustrious owners are Gustave Rosenthal, who fought in the American Revolutionary War, and General H. Rautsmann, who taught Carl Gustaf Emil Mannerheim, can be mentioned.

The construction of the main building which still exists today started in 1792 and was finished in 1818. It is a comparatively well-preserved manor house, with some interior features, such as original doors, stucco decoration, fireplaces and parquet floors, surviving to this day.

Apart from the main building, the manor park and some outbuildings, including a Gothic Revival smithy, remain.
