= Crawford expedition =

1782 campaign in the American Revolutionary War

- Part of the American Revolutionary War
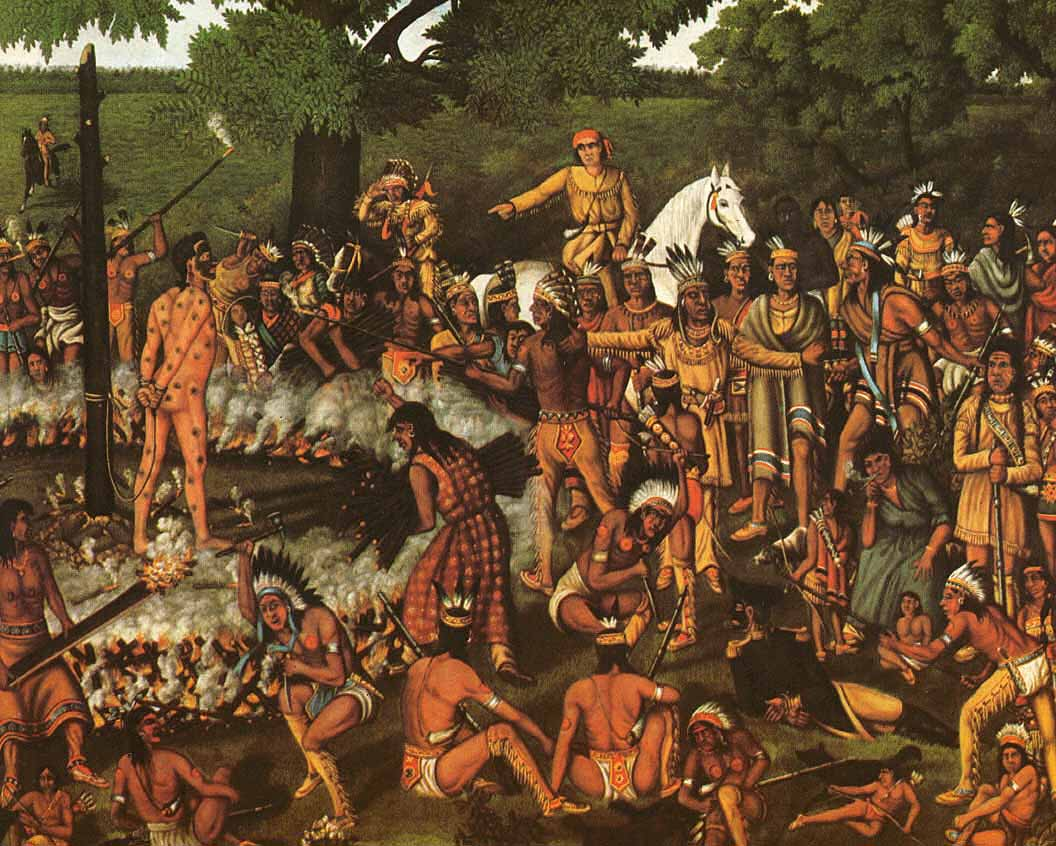
- Illustration of Crawford's execution
Date	May 25, 1782 – June 12, 1782
Location	Ohio Country
Result	British-Indian victory

Belligerents
Lenape; Wyandot; Shawnee; Ojibwe; Odawa; Potawatomi; Great Britain	United States

Commanders and leaders
Captain Pipe; Dunquat; Snake; William Caldwell; Alexander McKee; Matthew Elliott	William Crawford (executed); David Williamson; Thomas Gaddis; John McClelland (executed); Gustave Rosenthal; James Brenton; John Hardin

Strength
340–640 Indians; 100 provincials	500+ militia

Casualties and losses
6 killed 10–11 wounded	~70 killed

The Crawford expedition, also known as the Battle of Sandusky, the Sandusky expedition, and Crawford's Defeat, was a 1782 campaign on the western front of the American Revolutionary War, and one of the final operations of the conflict. The campaign was led by Colonel William Crawford, an experienced officer who had served in the Continental Army and a childhood friend of George Washington. Crawford's goal was to destroy enemy Native American towns along the Sandusky River in the Ohio Country, with the hope of ending Native attacks on American settlers. The expedition was one in a series of raids against enemy settlements that both sides had conducted throughout the war.

In late May 1782, Crawford led about 500 volunteer militiamen, mostly from Pennsylvania, deep into Native American territory, with the intention of surprising the Natives. The Indigenous groups and their British allies from Detroit learned of the expedition and gathered a force to oppose the Americans. A day of indecisive fighting took place near the Sandusky towns on June 4, with the Americans taking refuge in a grove that came to be known as "Battle Island." Native and British reinforcements arrived the following day. The Americans, finding themselves surrounded, retreated that night. The retreat became disorganized, with Crawford becoming separated from most of his men. As the retreat became a rout, another skirmish was fought on June 6. Most of the Americans managed to find their way back to Pennsylvania. Around 70 Americans were killed in both the fighting and subsequent executions; Native and British losses were minimal.

During the retreat, Crawford and an unknown number of his men were captured. The Indigenous combatants executed many of these captives in retaliation for the Gnadenhütten massacre that occurred earlier in the year, in which about 100 peaceful Indigenous people were murdered by Pennsylvanian militiamen. Crawford and surgeon Dr. John Knight were personally invited into the Delaware Nation village of Wingenim by the Native chiefs under the guidance of woodsman Simon Girty, a former Loyalist. As they sat, Crawford and Knight noticed the severed head of an American officer, Lt. John McClelland, which tribal members were kicking around as a ball for entertainment.

The two men were led by Girty to the tribal fire, where Crawford "was stripped naked, ordered to sit down by the fire and then beaten." At the chiefs' direction, Crawford was held down while his ears were cut off. In Knight's first-hand sworn testimony, Crawford pleaded with Girty to shoot him, to which the man "laughed heartily, and by all his gestures seemed delighted at the horrid scene." Crawford's subsequent execution was particularly brutal: he was tortured for at least two hours before being burned at the stake. His execution was widely publicized in the United States, worsening the already-strained relationship between Indigenous groups and Americans.

== Background ==
When the American Revolutionary War began in 1775, the Ohio River marked a tenuous border between the American colonies and the Natives of the Ohio Country. Ohio Natives—Shawnees, Mingos, Lenapes (Delawares), and Wyandots—were divided over how to respond to the war. Some Native leaders urged neutrality, while others entered the war because they saw it as an opportunity to halt the expansion of the American colonies and to regain lands previously lost to the colonists.

The border war escalated in 1777 after British officials in Detroit began recruiting and arming Native war parties to raid undefended frontier American settlements. An unknown number of American settlers in present Kentucky, West Virginia, and Pennsylvania were killed in these raids. The intensity of the conflict increased in November 1777, after American militiamen murdered Cornstalk, the leading advocate of Shawnee neutrality. Despite the violence, many Ohio Natives still hoped to stay out of the war, which proved difficult because they were located directly between the British in Detroit and the Americans along the Ohio River.

In February 1778, the Americans launched their first expedition into the Ohio Country in an attempt to neutralize British activity in the region. General Edward Hand led 500 Pennsylvania militiamen on a surprise winter march from Fort Pitt towards the Cuyahoga River, where the British stored military supplies that were distributed to Native raiding parties. Adverse weather conditions prevented the expedition from reaching its objective. On the return march, some of Hand's men attacked peaceful Lenapes, killing one man and a few women and children, including relatives of the Lenape chief Captain Pipe (Hopocan). Because only non-combatants had been killed, the expedition became derisively known as the "squaw campaign".

Despite the attack on his family, Captain Pipe said that he would not seek vengeance. Instead, in September 1778, he was one of the signers of the Treaty of Fort Pitt between the Lenapes and the United States. Americans hoped this agreement would enable American soldiers to pass through Lenape territory and attack Detroit, but the alliance deteriorated after the death of White Eyes, the Lenape chief who had negotiated the treaty. Eventually, Captain Pipe turned against the Americans and moved his followers west to the Sandusky River, where he received support from the British in Detroit. (Note: Calloway argues that while Captain Pipe has often been characterized as being "pro-British" early in the war, Pipe was actually an advocate of Lenape neutrality until about 1779.)

Over the next several years, Americans and Natives launched raids against each other, usually targeting settlements. In 1780, hundreds of Kentucky settlers were killed or captured in a British-Native expedition into Kentucky. George Rogers Clark of Virginia responded in August 1780 by leading an expedition that destroyed two Shawnee towns along the Mad River, but did little damage to the Native war effort. As most of the Lenapes had by then become pro-British, American Colonel Daniel Brodhead led an expedition into the Ohio Country in April 1781 and destroyed the Lenape town of Coshocton. Clark then recruited men for an expedition against Detroit in the summer of 1781, but Natives decisively defeated one hundred of his men along the Ohio River, effectively ending his campaign. Survivors fled to the militant towns on the Sandusky River.

Several villages of Christian Lenapes lay between the combatants on the Sandusky River and the Americans at Fort Pitt. The villages were administered by the Moravian missionaries David Zeisberger and John Heckewelder. Although pacifists, the missionaries favored the American cause and kept American officials at Fort Pitt informed about hostile British and Native activity. In September 1781, to prevent further communication between the missionaries and the American military, hostile Wyandots and Lenapes from Sandusky forcibly removed the missionaries and their converts to a new village (Captive Town) on the Sandusky River.

In March 1782, nearly 200 Pennsylvania militiamen under Lieutenant Colonel David Williamson rode into the Ohio Country, hoping to rescue American captives and find the warriors who were responsible for raids against Pennsylvania settlers. Enraged by the gruesome murder by Natives of a white woman and her baby, Williamson's men detained about 100 Christian Lenapes at the village of Gnadenhütten. The Christian Lenapes (mostly women and children) had returned to Gnadenhütten from Captive Town to harvest the crops they had been forced to leave behind. Accusing the Christian Natives of having aided hostile raiding parties, the Pennsylvanians beat them to death and left the bodies to rot. The Gnadenhütten massacre, as it came to be called, would have serious repercussions for the next American expedition into the Ohio Country. When George Washington learned of the Gnadenhütten massacre, he warned soldiers not to let themselves be taken alive by Natives, but by that time the Sandusky expedition had already begun.

== Planning the expedition ==
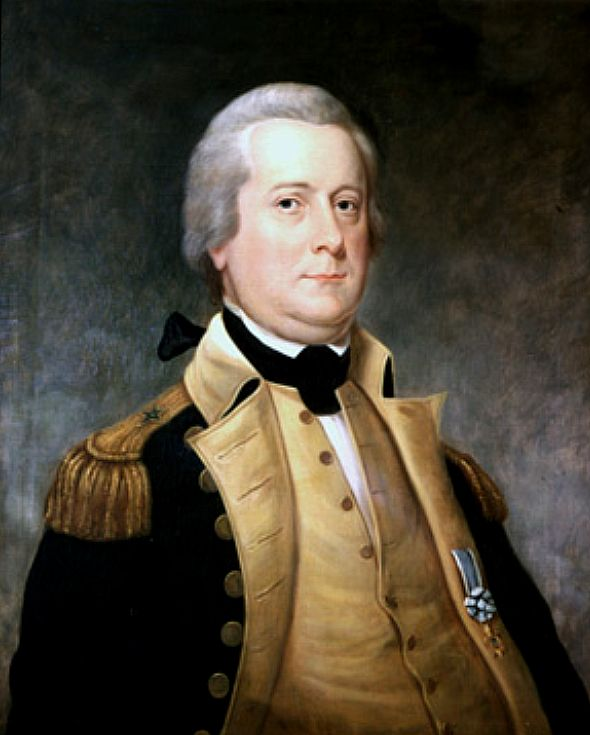
Lacking the resources to conduct a Continental Army campaign, General William Irvine helped volunteers launch the Sandusky expedition.

In September 1781, General William Irvine was appointed commander of the Western Department of the Continental Army, which was headquartered at Fort Pitt. Although a major British army under Lord Cornwallis had surrendered at Yorktown in October 1781, virtually ending the war in the east, the conflict on the western frontier continued. Irvine received word that Americans living on the frontier wanted a military expedition against Detroit to end ongoing British support for the American Indian war parties. Irvine investigated, then wrote to Washington on December 2, 1781:

It is, I believe, universally agreed that the only way to keep Indians from harassing the country is to visit them. But we find, by experience, that burning their empty towns has not the desired effect. They can soon build others. They must be followed up and beaten, or the British, whom they draw their support from, totally driven out of their country. I believe if Detroit was demolished, it would be a good step toward giving some, at least, temporary ease to this country.

Washington agreed with Irvine's assessment that Detroit had to be captured or destroyed to end the war in the west. In February 1782, Irvine followed up by sending Washington a detailed plan for an offensive. Irvine estimated that with 2,000 men, five cannons, and a supply caravan, he could capture Detroit. Unfortunately, Washington's reply was that the bankrupt US Congress would be unable to finance the campaign, writing that "offensive operations, except upon a small scale, can not just now be brought into contemplation."

All Irvine could do was grant permission for volunteers to organize their own offensive. Detroit was too distant and too strong for a small-scale operation, but local militia commanders such as Williamson believed that an expedition against the American Indian towns on the Sandusky River was feasible. To reduce expenses, each volunteer would have to procure his own horse, rifle, ammunition, rations, and other equipment. Their only payment would be an exemption from two months of militia duty once the campaign was finished, plus whatever plunder might be taken from the Natives. Because of ongoing Native raids — the wife and children of a Baptist minister were killed and scalped in western Pennsylvania on May 12, 1782 — there was no shortage of men willing to volunteer.

Irvine did not seek command of the expedition himself out of concern that doing so as a uniformed Continental soldier would be considered illegal, but he worked to influence the planning of the campaign. Irvine wrote detailed instructions for (as yet unselected) commander of the volunteers:

The object of your command is, to destroy with fire and sword (if practicable) the Indian town and settlement at Sandusky, by which we hope to give ease and safety to the inhabitants of this country; but, if impracticable, then you will doubtless perform such other services in your power as will, in their consequences, have a tendency to answer this great end. (Note: John Heckewelder, the Moravian minister whose congregation had been murdered at Gnadenhütten, wrote an influential account of the Sandusky expedition in which he claimed the real purpose of the campaign was to find and kill the remaining peaceful Moravian Natives. Butterfield could find no documented support for this accusation, arguing that the goal of the campaign was clearly the hostile Sandusky towns.)

== Organizing the expedition ==
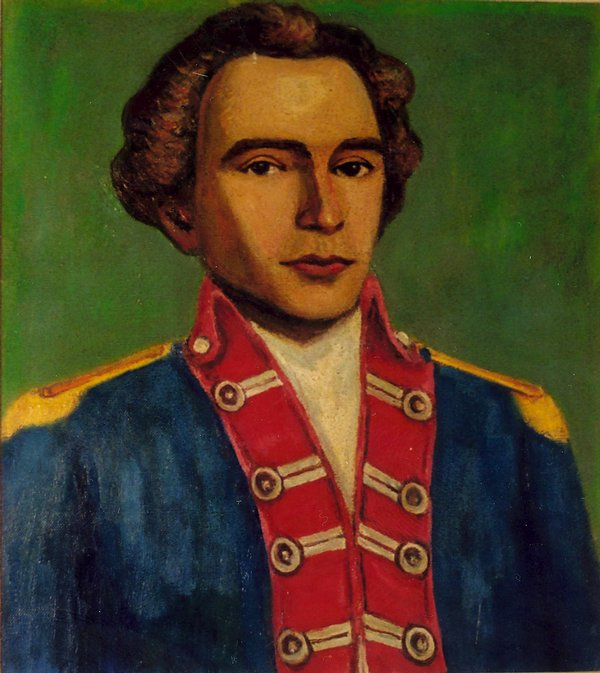
Colonel William Crawford, depicted here at 35 years old, was a veteran soldier and longtime associate of George Washington. He was elected to lead the Sandusky expedition at age 59.

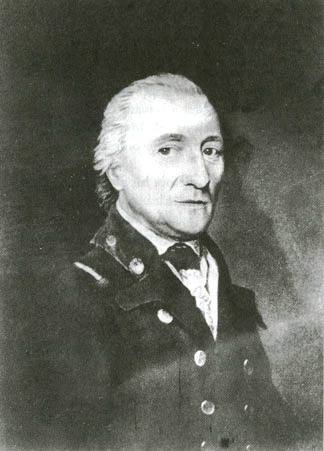
Gustav Heinrich von Wetter-Rosenthal

On May 20, 1782, the volunteers began gathering at the rendezvous point at Mingo Bottom on the Native side of the Ohio River. They were mostly young men of Irish and Scots-Irish ancestry, and came primarily from Washington and Westmoreland counties in Pennsylvania. Many were Continental Army veterans, and many had taken part in the Gnadenhütten massacre. The exact number of men who took part in the expedition is unknown. An officer wrote to Irvine on May 24 that there were 480 volunteers, although additional men may have subsequently joined the group. By examining pension files and other records, historian Parker Brown concluded as many as 583 men may have taken part in the expedition, though an unknown number of these deserted before reaching Sandusky. Given the daunting nature of the task ahead of them, many of the volunteers made sure to prepare "last wills and testaments" before leaving.

Because this was a volunteer expedition, the men elected their officers. The candidates for the top position were Williamson, a local hero for his exploits as an Indian fighter, and William Crawford, an experienced soldier who had resigned from the Continental Army in 1781 Crawford, also a seasoned land agent and surveyor, was a veteran of these kinds of operations. During Dunmore's War, he had led an expedition that destroyed a Mingo village in the Ohio Country, and in 1778 he had taken part in the failed "squaw campaign". At nearly 60 years of age, he had been reluctant to volunteer, but did so at Irvine's request. Although Williamson was expected to win, Irvine made it known he favored Crawford's election as commander because he hoped to avoid a repeat of the Gnadenhütten massacre. Irvine knew many residents of western Pennsylvania resented Continental Army officers. "The general and common opinion of the people of this country is that all Continental officers are too fond of Indians," he wrote. The election, which was acrimonious, ended in a close vote: Crawford received 235 votes to Williamson's 230. Crawford took command with the rank of colonel, and Williamson became second-in-command with the rank of major. The other majors were John B. McClelland, Thomas Gaddis, and James Brenton. (Note: Butterfield wrote that fifth in command was a "Major Brinton", also spelled "Brenton", and that he had seen no record of his first name. Years later, in the Washington-Irvine Correspondence (1882), Butterfield published a letter Irvine wrote to Washington in which Irvine listed the major's full name as "James Brenton.")

At Crawford's request, Irvine allowed Dr. John Knight, a Continental Army officer, to accompany the expedition as surgeon. Another volunteer from Irvine's staff was a foreigner with an aristocratic bearing who called himself "John Rose", who served as Crawford's aide-de-camp. Unknown even to Irvine until several years later, Rose was actually Baron Gustave Rosenthal, a Baltic German nobleman from the Russian empire who had fled to America after killing a man in a duel. Rosenthal is the only Russian known to have fought on the American side in the Revolutionary War. Rosenthal kept a detailed journal of the expedition, presumably to aid him in writing a full report for Irvine.

== Journey to the Sandusky ==
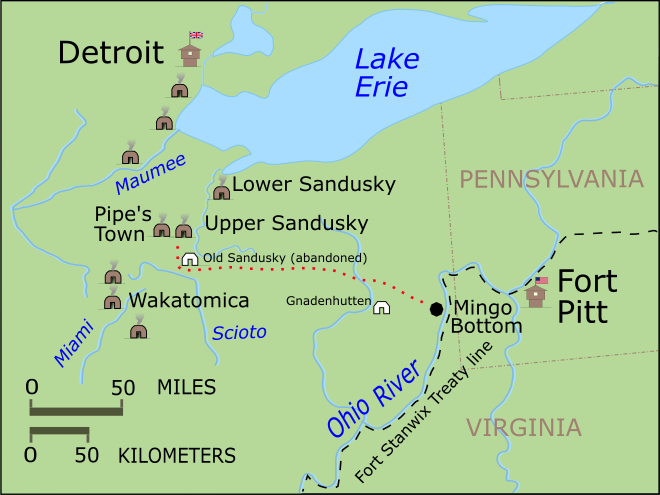
Route of the Crawford expedition

Crawford's volunteers left Mingo Bottom on May 25, 1782, carrying provisions for 30 days. In planning the operation, General Irvine had estimated the 175-mile (282 km) journey to Sandusky would take seven days. The campaign began with high expectations. Some volunteers boasted they intended "to extermenate the whole Wiandott Tribe."

As was often the case with militia, who prized their independence and loathed taking orders, there was difficulty maintaining discipline. The men wasted their rations, and then ignored their commanders to go hunting. They were slow to break camp in the mornings, and often failed to take their turn at guard duty. Crawford also proved to be a less capable leader than expected. Rose wrote that Crawford in councils "speaks incoherent, proposes matters confusedly, and is incapable of persuading people into his opinion." Precious hours were lost as the officers argued over what to do next. Hungry and disheartened, some of the militia deserted; Crawford did nothing to stop them.

The journey across the Ohio Country was mostly through woods. The volunteers initially marched in four columns, but the thick underbrush sometimes compelled them to form just two. On June 3, Crawford's men emerged into the open country of the Sandusky Plains, a prairie region just below of the Sandusky River. The following day, June 4, they reached Upper Sandusky, the Wyandot village where they expected to find the enemy, only to discover it had been abandoned. Unknown to the Americans, the Wyandots had recently relocated their town eight miles (13 km) to the north. The new Upper Sandusky, also called the "Half King's Town", was near present-day Upper Sandusky, Ohio and close to Captain Pipe's Town (near present-day Carey, Ohio). The Americans were unaware that Pipe's Town was nearby.

Crawford held a council of war with his officers. Some argued the abandoned village proved the Natives knew about the expedition and were concentrating their forces elsewhere. Others insisted that the expedition was a failure and that they should return home. Williamson asked for permission to take 50 men and burn the abandoned village, but Crawford refused because he did not wish to divide his force. The council decided that they would march for one more day, and then turn back. As the column halted for lunch, Rose was sent north with a scouting party. Soon, two men returned to report that the scouts were skirmishing with a large force of Natives that was advancing towards the Americans. The Battle of Sandusky had begun.

== British and Native preparations ==
While planning the expedition, General Irvine had advised Crawford that, "Your best chance of success will be, if possible, to effect a surprise" against Sandusky. The British and Natives, however, learned about the expedition even before Crawford's army had left Mingo Bottom. Thanks to information from a captured American deserter, British agent Simon Girty relayed to Detroit an accurate report of Crawford's plans on April 8.

Officials of the British Indian Department in Detroit had accordingly prepared for action. In command at Detroit was Major Arent Schuyler DePeyster, responsible to Sir Frederick Haldimand, the Governor General of British North America. DePeyster used agents such as Girty, Alexander McKee, and Matthew Elliott, who all had close relations with Natives, to coordinate British and Native military actions in the Ohio County. In a council at Detroit on May 15, DePeyster and McKee told a gathering of Natives about the Sandusky expedition and advised them to "be ready to meet them in a great body and repulse them." McKee was sent to the Shawnee villages in the Great Miami River valley to recruit warriors to repel the American invasion. Captain William Caldwell was dispatched to Sandusky with a company of mounted soldiers from Butler's Rangers, a Loyalist provincial unit, as well as a number of Natives from the Detroit area led by Matthew Elliott. The Natives from the Detroit area, described as "Lake Indians" by the British, included the "Council of Three Fires" as well as northern Wyandots.

Native scouts spied on the expedition from the beginning. As soon as Crawford's army moved into the Ohio Country, the warning was sent to Sandusky. As the Americans approached, women and children from the Wyandot and Lenape towns were hidden in nearby ravines, while British fur traders packed their goods and hurried out of town. On June 4, Lenapes under Captain Pipe and Wyandots under Dunquat, the "Half King", along with some Mingos, joined forces to oppose the Americans. The size of the combined Lenape, Wyandot, and Mingo force has been estimated at 200 to 500 or more warriors. (Note: Nester, Belue, and Rauch give the total of Lenapes, Wyandots, and Mingoes as 200, while Sosin gives it as 500. Butterfield writes that the Lenapes numbered 200, and when combined with the Wyandots, they "considerably outnumbered" the Americans. Years later, it was said the Wyandots fielded 400 warriors under Dunquat. Downes also writes that the Natives outnumbered Crawford. Mann gives the combined Native and ranger force at 230 men.) British reinforcements were nearby, but Shawnees from the south were not expected to arrive until the next day. When the American scouts appeared, Pipe's Lenapes pursued them, while the Wyandots temporarily held back.

== Battle of Sandusky ==
=== June 4: "Battle Island" ===
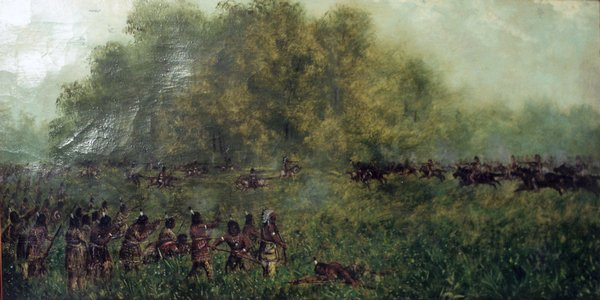
Depiction of the action at "Battle Island" by Frank Halbedel, c. 1880

The first skirmishing of the Crawford expedition began at about 2 p.m. on June 4, 1782. The scouting party led by John Rose encountered Captain Pipe's Lenapes on the Sandusky plains and conducted a fighting retreat to a grove of trees where they had stored their supplies. The scouts were in danger of being overrun, but were soon reinforced by the main body of Crawford's army. (Note: Butterfield, who did not have Rose's journal, omits the detail that the scouts were still in the grove when Crawford arrived.) Crawford ordered the men to dismount and drive the Natives out of the woods. After intense fighting, the Americans gained possession of the grove, later known as "Battle Island".

The skirmish became a full-scale battle by 4:00 p.m. After the Americans drove Captain Pipe's Lenapes out of the woods and onto the prairie, the Lenapes were reinforced by Dunquat's Wyandots. (Note: Butterfield gives the Wyandot war chief's name as "Zhaus-sho-toh," but in later writing he says Dunquat was in command.) British Indian Department agent Matthew Elliott may have been present, coordinating Lenape and Wyandot actions. (Note: There is disagreement about the time of Elliot's arrival. According to Horsman, Elliot was with the Wyandot reinforcements on June 4. According to Belue, Elliott arrived with more rangers and Great Lakes Indians on June 5.) Pipe's Lenapes skillfully outflanked the American position and then attacked their rear. A few Natives crept close to the American lines in the tall prairie grass. The Americans responded by climbing trees to get a better shot at them. Gunsmoke filled the air, making it difficult to see. After three and a half hours of incessant firing, the Natives gradually broke off the attack with the approach of nightfall. Both sides slept with arms at the ready, and surrounded their positions with large fires to prevent surprise night attacks.

In the first day of fighting, the Americans lost 5 killed men and 19 wounded. The British and Natives suffered 5 killed and 11 wounded. The British and Natives had suffered a setback early in the battle when William Caldwell, commander of the rangers, was wounded in both legs and was compelled to leave the field. The American volunteers scalped several of the Native dead, while the Natives stripped the clothing from dead Americans and scalped at least one. Fifteen Pennsylvanians deserted during the night; they returned home to report Crawford's army had been "cut to pieces."

=== June 5: Shawnee reinforcements, American retreat ===
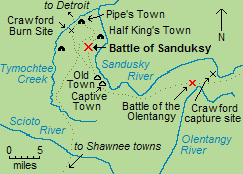
Location of significant places and events in the Sandusky area

Firing began early on the morning of June 5, the Natives remaining at a distance of two or three hundred yards. Such long-range firing with smooth bore muskets caused little loss to either side. The Americans thought that the Natives held back because they had suffered heavy losses on the previous day. In fact, the Natives were buying time, waiting for reinforcements to arrive. Crawford decided to hold his position in the trees and make a surprise attack on the Natives after nightfall. At this point, he was still confident of success, although his men were low on ammunition and water. Simon Girty, the British Indian Department agent and interpreter, rode up with a white flag and called for the Americans to surrender, which was refused.

That afternoon, the Americans finally noticed about 100 rangers were fighting alongside the Natives. Unaware that the expedition had been watched from the beginning, the Americans were surprised British forces from Detroit had been able to join in the battle on such short notice. While the Americans were discussing this, Alexander McKee arrived with about 140 Shawnees led by Black Snake (Peteusha), who took up a position to Crawford's south, effectively surrounding the Americans. The Shawnees repeatedly fired their muskets into the air, a ceremonial show of strength known as a feu de joie ("fire of joy"), which shook American morale. Recalled Rose, the feu de joie "completed the Business with us." With so many enemies gathering around them, the Americans decided to retreat after dark rather than make a stand. The dead were buried, and fires were burned over the graves to prevent their discovery and desecration. The severely wounded were placed on biers in preparation for the withdrawal under cover of darkness.

The plan was to retreat along the same path on which they had arrived, with Major McClelland's division leading the way. When Crawford learned that Captain John Hardin's unit had departed too early, he halted the retreat and rode after Hardin's men, hoping to bring them back in line. He was too late: Native sentries opened fire on Hardin's men, creating panic and confusion. McClelland's men stampeded forward, leaving their commander behind. Many Americans became lost in the dark, separating into small groups. When Major Brenton was wounded, Major Daniel Leet took command of his division and led about 90 men, including John Crawford (the elder Crawford's son) to the west. They managed to break out and escaped back to American territory.

In the confusion, Crawford became concerned about his family members — his son John, his son-in-law William Harrison, and his nephew, also named William Crawford. With Dr. Knight accompanying, Crawford attempted to search for his relatives as the militia panicked and fled all around them. Finally, the pair, now joined by two militiamen who were also lost, finally set off, but were unable to find the main body of men.

=== June 6: Battle of the Olentangy ===
When the sun rose on June 6, 250 to 300 Americans had reached the abandoned Wyandot town. Because Colonel Crawford was missing, Williamson assumed command. (Note: Several brief accounts of the expedition state it was Crawford who "made a stand" with his men at the Battle of Olentangy and that his capture took place after this skirmish. However, the detailed accounts of Butterfield and Brown make it clear that Crawford went missing the night before and was not present during the battle. The confusion stems from the fact that Colonel Crawford's nephew, also named William Crawford, was present at the Olentangy battle. In his journal, Rose wrote that "Mr. William Crawford" became separated during the battle, referring to the colonel's nephew.) Fortunately for the Americans, the pursuit of the retreating army was disorganized because Caldwell, overall commander of the British and Native forces, had been wounded early in the battle. Caldwell believed none of the Americans would have escaped had he still been present. As the retreat continued, a force of Natives finally caught up with the main body of Americans on the eastern edge of the Sandusky Plains, near a branch of the Olentangy River. Some Americans fled as the attack began, while others milled around in confusion. Williamson made a stand with a small group of volunteers and drove off the Natives after an hour of fighting. Three Americans were killed and eight more wounded in the "Battle of the Olentangy". Native losses are unknown.

The Americans buried their dead and resumed the retreat, the Natives and rangers pursuing and firing occasionally from long range. Williamson and Rose kept most of the men together by warning them that an orderly retreat was their only chance to get home alive. The Americans fell back more than 30 miles (48 km), some on foot, before making camp. The next day, two American stragglers were captured and presumably killed before the Natives and rangers finally abandoned the chase. The main body of Americans reached Mingo Bottom on June 13. Many stragglers arrived in small groups for several days more.

== Fates of the captives ==
Captives taken by Natives during the American Revolution might be ransomed by the British in Detroit, adopted into the tribe, enslaved, or killed. The number of American prisoners executed after the Sandusky expedition is unknown, since their fate was usually recorded only if one of the prisoners survived to tell. While some were executed quickly, others were tortured before being killed. The public torture of prisoners was a traditional ritual in many tribes of the Eastern Woodlands. Captives might be subjected to excruciating torture for hours and even days. The British Indian Department discouraged the killing and torturing of prisoners, with some success, but in 1782 Ohio Natives revived ritual torture in revenge for the Gnadenhütten massacre.

=== Shawnee prisoners ===
During the June 5 retreat, an American scout named John Slover fled eastward with a small group of soldiers. He and two others were captured on June 8 and taken to Wakatomika, a Shawnee town on the Mad River, in present Logan County, Ohio. One of Slover's companions was painted black by the Shawnees, the traditional sign he was to be executed. The villagers, made aware of the coming of prisoners by a messenger, formed two lines. The three prisoners were made to run the gauntlet towards the council house, about 300 yards (270 m) distance. As the prisoners ran by, the villagers beat them with clubs, concentrating on the one who had been painted black. The blackened prisoner was then hacked to death with tomahawks and cut into pieces. His head and limbs were stuck on poles outside the town.

While at Wakatomika, Slover recognized the remains of three other Americans who had recently suffered the same fate: Major McClelland, who had been fourth in command of the expedition, as well as Private William Crawford (Colonel Crawford's nephew) and William Harrison (Crawford's son-in-law). The next day, their heads and limbs were also impaled on poles and their torsos fed to dogs. Slover's other companion was sent to another town to be burned. Slover was taken to Mac-a-chack (near present West Liberty, Ohio), but escaped before he could be burnt. Naked, he stole a horse and rode it until it gave out, then ran on foot, reaching Fort Pitt on July 10, one of the last survivors to return. (Note: The last to come home from the expedition may have been Joseph Pipes, who was held by Shawnees until 1786.)

=== Crawford's capture, trial, and execution ===
After being separated from the main body of men, Crawford, Knight, and four other stragglers traveled southeast along the Sandusky River in present-day Crawford County, Ohio. On June 7, they came upon a party of Lenapes about 28 miles (45 km) east of the battlefield. Knight raised his gun, but Crawford told him not to fire. Crawford and Knight knew some of these Lenapes, who were part of a band led by a war chief named Wingenund. Crawford and Knight were taken prisoner, but the other four Americans escaped. Two of them were later tracked down, killed, and scalped. Crawford and Knight were taken to Wingenund's camp, where they found eight other prisoners. On June 9, while the other prisoners were taken to Old Town, Crawford was taken to Half King's Town where he met with Simon Girty. Girty told Crawford the Lenapes were enraged about the Gnadenhütten massacre, and offered to assist Crawford in escaping, but Crawford was too exhausted and discouraged to make an attempt.

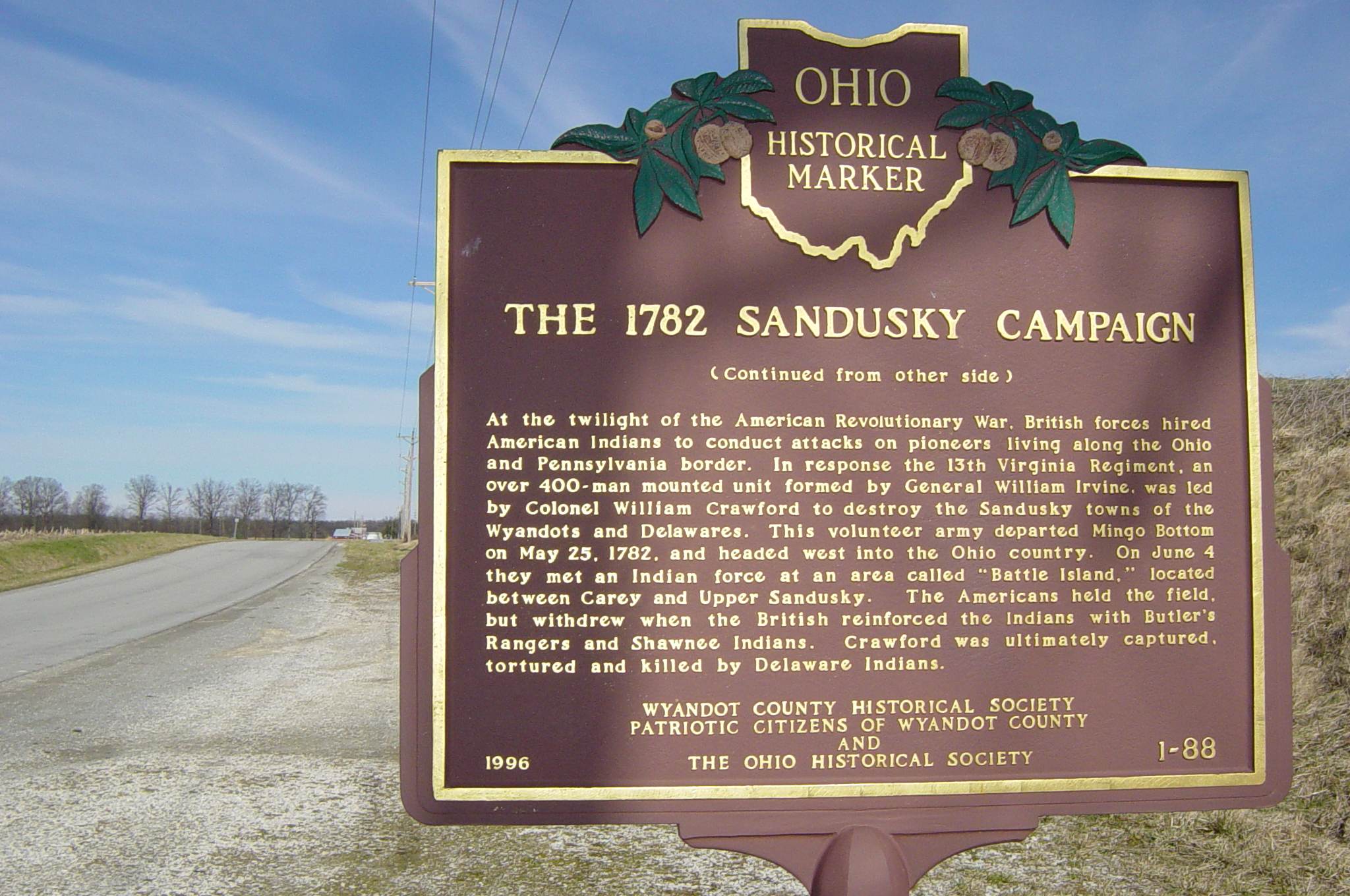
Ohio Historical Society marker at the Colonel Crawford Burn Site Monument in Wyandot County, Ohio

On June 10, Captain Pipe arrived in Old Town and painted the faces of the prisoners black. When Crawford was reunited with the other prisoners, his face was painted black as well. The prisoners were marched to an unnamed Lenape town on Tymochtee Creek, near present-day Crawford, Ohio. Four prisoners were killed with tomahawks and scalped along the way. At the town, Crawford and Knight were guarded while the other prisoners were killed with tomahawks by Lenape women and boys. The boys scalped the victims and slapped the bloody scalps in the faces of Crawford and Knight. Crawford and Knight were made to run the gauntlet, then marched to Pipe's Town.

On the evening of June 10, a council convened at Pipe's Town to determine Crawford's fate. Crawford was accused of taking part in the Gnadenhütten massacre. With Simon Girty serving as his interpreter, Crawford denied the charge. However, Pipe's sister-in-law, Micheykapeeci, recognized Crawford as one of the leaders of the 1778 "squaw campaign," in which her husband (Pipe's brother) and Pipe's mother had been killed. After her testimony, Crawford was condemned to death by fire. Girty offered to ransom Crawford, but his effort to spare Crawford's life was rejected. Although Crawford was not responsible for the Gnadenhütten massacre, historian Colin G. Calloway writes that "Pipe and the Delawares knew Crawford, and they knew what he stood for. The spirits of the slain Moravians cried for vengeance, but the Delawares also vented their outrage on a surveyor, land speculator, and soldier who had threatened their lands and lives for years."

On June 11, about one hundred men, women, and children gathered near Pipe's Town to witness Crawford's execution. Dunquat and a few Wyandots were present, as well as Matthew Elliott. Crawford was stripped naked and beaten. His hands were tied behind his back, and a rope was tied from his hands to a post in the ground. A large fire was lit about six or seven yards (6.4 m) from the pole. Native men stuck charges of gunpowder into Crawford's body, then cut off his ears. Crawford was poked with burning pieces of wood from the fire, and hot coals were thrown at him, which he was compelled to walk on. Crawford begged Girty to shoot him, but Girty replied that he could not interfere. After about two hours to four hours of torture, Crawford fell down unconscious. He was scalped, and a woman poured hot coals over his head, which revived him. He began to walk about insensibly as the torture continued. After he finally died, his body was completely eviscerated.

The next day, Knight was taken towards the Shawnee towns, where he was to be executed. Along the way, he struck his guard with a log and managed to escape. He successfully made his way back to Pennsylvania on foot. By the time hunters found him on July 4, he was in poor health and barely coherent. They carried him to Fort McIntosh.

== Aftermath ==
=== Casualties ===
The exact number of casualties resulting from the Crawford expedition is not known. On June 7, 1782, a ranger reported to DePeyster that, "Our loss is very inconsiderable. We had but one ranger killed and two wounded [including Caldwell]. LeVillier, the interpreter, and four Indians were killed and eight wounded. The loss of the enemy is one hundred killed and fifty wounded." British estimates of American casualties proved to be excessive. Historian Consul W. Butterfield, who wrote the only book-length study of the expedition, estimated the total American killed at "less than seventy." Historian Parker Brown identified the names of forty-one Americans who were killed (including executed prisoners), seventeen who were wounded, and seven who were captured but later escaped or were released. He noted his list was likely incomplete.

=== Final year of the war ===
The failure of the Crawford expedition caused alarm along the American frontier, as many Americans feared the Natives would be emboldened by their victory and launch a new series of raids. More defeats for the Americans were yet to come, and so for Americans west of the Appalachian Mountains, 1782 became known as the "Bloody Year". On July 13, 1782, the Mingo leader Guyasuta led about 100 Natives and several British volunteers into Pennsylvania, destroying Hannastown, killing nine and capturing twelve settlers. It was the hardest blow dealt by Natives in Western Pennsylvania during the war.

In Kentucky, the Americans went on the defensive while Caldwell and his Native allies prepared a major offensive. In July 1782, more than 1,000 Natives gathered at Wakatomika, but the expedition came to a halt after scouts reported that George Rogers Clark was preparing to invade the Ohio Country from Kentucky. Most of the Natives dispersed after learning that the reports of imminent invasion were false, but Caldwell led 300 Natives into Kentucky and delivered a devastating blow at the Battle of Blue Licks in August. After his victory at Blue Licks, Caldwell was ordered to cease operations because the United States and Great Britain were about to make peace. Although Irvine had finally gotten permission to lead his own expedition into the Ohio Country, rumors of the peace treaty killed enthusiasm for the undertaking, which never took place. In November 1782, George Rogers Clark delivered the final blow in the Ohio Country, destroying several Shawnee towns, but inflicting little damage on the inhabitants.

Details of the forthcoming peace treaty arrived late in 1782. The Ohio Country, the land that the British and Natives had successfully defended, had been signed away by Great Britain to the United States. The British had not consulted the Natives in the peace process, and the Natives were nowhere mentioned in the treaty's terms. For the Natives, the struggle with American settlers would resume in the Northwest Indian War, though this time without the assistance of their British allies.

=== Impact of Crawford's death ===
Crawford's death was widely publicized in the United States. A ballad about the expedition, entitled "Crawford's Defeat by the Indians", became popular and was long remembered in several versions. In 1783, John Knight's eyewitness account of Crawford's torture, along with Slover's captivity narrative, were published in Francis Bailey's Freeman's Journal and in a separate pamphlet. Knight's editor, Hugh Henry Brackenridge, was an "acknowledged Indian-hater" who described Natives as "the animals vulgarly called Indians." Brackenridge altered Knight's narrative, deleting mentions of Crawford's trial and the fact that Crawford was executed in retaliation for the Gnadenhütten massacre. By suppressing the Natives' motivation, Brackenridge was able, according to historian Parker Brown, to create "a piece of virulent anti-Indian, anti-British propaganda calculated to arouse public attention and patriotism." Brackenridge called for the extermination or expulsion of all Native Americans and the seizure of their lands. In an introduction to the narratives, Bailey endorsed the idea:

But as they [the Natives] still continue their murders on our frontier, these Narratives may be serviceable to induce our government to take some effectual steps to chastise and suppress them; as from hence, they will see that the nature of an Indian is fierce and cruel, and that an extirpation of them would be useful to the world, and honorable to those who can effect it.

As intended, Knight's narrative increased racial antipathy towards Native Americans, and was often republished over the next 80 years, especially whenever violent encounters between white Americans and Natives were in the news. Although American frontiersmen had often killed Native prisoners, most Americans regarded Native culture as barbaric because of the use of torture, and Crawford's death greatly reinforced this perception of Natives as "savages". In the American national memory, the details of Crawford's torture overshadowed American atrocities such as the Gnadenhütten massacre. The image of the savage Native became a stereotype; the peacekeeping efforts of men like Cornstalk and White Eyes were all but forgotten.

== See also ==
- Crawford's Defeat by the Indians; a song by Dr. John Knight, 1782.

== Sources ==
- Anderson, James H. (1898). "Colonel William Crawford". Ohio Archaeological and Historical Quarterly. 6: 1–34.
- Belue, Ted Franklin (1993). "Crawford's Sandusky Expedition". In Richard L. Blanco (ed.). The American Revolution, 1775–1783: An Encyclopedia. Vol. 1. New York: Garland. pp. 416–20. ISBN 0-8240-5623-X.
- Boatner, Mark Mayo III (2006). "Crawford's Defeat". Encyclopedia of the American Revolution: Library of Military History (2nd ed.). Detroit: Scribner's. ISBN 0-684-31513-0.
- Brown, Parker B. (March 1981). "'Crawford's Defeat': A Ballad". Western Pennsylvania Historical Magazine. 64: 311–27.
- Brown, Parker B. (January 1982a). "Reconstructing Crawford's Army of 1782". Western Pennsylvania Historical Magazine. 65: 17–36.
- Brown, Parker B. (April 1982b). "The Battle of Sandusky: June 4–6, 1782". Western Pennsylvania Historical Magazine. 65: 115–51.
- Brown, Parker B. (October 1982c). "The Fate of Crawford Volunteers Captured by Indians Following the Battle of Sandusky in 1782". Western Pennsylvania Historical Magazine. 65: 323–39.
- Brown, Parker B. (January 1987). "The Historical Accuracy of the Captivity Narrative of Doctor John Knight". Western Pennsylvania Historical Magazine. 70: 53–67.
- Butterfield, Consul Willshire (1873). An Historical Account of the Expedition against Sandusky under Col. William Crawford in 1782. Cincinnati: Clarke.
- Butterfield, Consul Willshire, ed. (1882). Washington–Irvine Correspondence: The official letters which passed between Washington and Brig-Gen. William Irvine and between Irvine and others concerning military affairs in the West from 1781 to 1783. Madison, Wisconsin: Atwood.
- Butterfield, Consul Willshire (1890). History of the Girtys. Cincinnati: Clarke.
- Calloway, Colin G. (1995). The American Revolution in Indian Country: Crisis and Diversity in Native American Communities. Cambridge University Press. ISBN 0-521-47149-4.
- Calloway, Colin G. (1999). "Captain Pipe". American National Biography. Vol. 4. Oxford University Press. doi:10.1093/anb/9780198606697.article.2000789. ISBN 0-19-512783-8.
- Calloway, Colin G. (2018). The Indian World of George Washington. New York: Oxford University Press. ISBN 978-0-19-065216-6. LCCN 2017028686.
- Clifton, James A. (1999). "Dunquat". American National Biography. Vol. 7. New York: Oxford University Press. pp. 105–07. ISBN 0-19-512786-2.
- Dowd, Gregory Evans (1992). A Spirited Resistance: The North American Indian Struggle for Unity, 1745–1815. Baltimore: Johns Hopkins University Press. ISBN 0-8018-4609-9.
- Downes, Randolph C. (1940). Council Fires on the Upper Ohio: A Narrative of Indian Affairs in the Upper Ohio Valley until 1795. Pittsburgh: University of Pittsburgh Press. ISBN 0-8229-5201-7.
- Grenier, John (2005). The First Way of War: American War Making on the Frontier, 1607–1814. Cambridge University Press. ISBN 0-521-84566-1.
- Hoffman, Phillip W. (2008). Simon Girty: Turncoat Hero. Franklin, Tennessee: Flying Camp Press. ISBN 978-0-9842256-3-7.
- Horsman, Reginald (1964). Matthew Elliott, British Indian Agent. Detroit: Wayne State University Press.
- Howard, James H. (1981). Shawnee! The Ceremonialism of a Native American Tribe and its Cultural Background. Athens, Ohio: Ohio University Press. ISBN 0-8214-0417-2.
- Hurt, R. Douglas (1996). The Ohio Frontier: Crucible of the Old Northwest, 1720–1830. Bloomington: Indiana University Press. ISBN 0-253-33210-9.
- Mann, Barbara Alice. (2005). George Washington's War on Native America. Westport, Connecticut: Praeger. ISBN 0-275-98177-0.
- Miller, Sarah E. (2006). "William Crawford". The Encyclopedia of the American Revolutionary War: A Political, Social, and Military History. Vol. 1. Santa Barbara, California: ABC-CLIO. pp. 311–13. ISBN 1-85109-408-3.
- Nelson, Larry L. (1999). A Man of Distinction among Them: Alexander McKee and the Ohio Country Frontier, 1754–1799. Kent, Ohio: Kent State University Press. ISBN 0-87338-620-5.
- Nester, William (2004). The Frontier War for American Independence. Mechanicsburg, Pennsylvania: Stackpole. ISBN 0-8117-0077-1.
- O'Donnell, James H. III (1999). "William Crawford". American National Biography. doi:10.1093/anb/9780198606697.article.0200098.
- Olmstead, Earl P. (1991). Blackcoats among the Delaware: David Zeisberger on the Ohio Frontier. Kent State University Press. ISBN 0-87338-422-9.
- Quaife, Milo Milton (1931). "The Ohio Campaigns of 1782". Mississippi Valley Historical Review. 17 (4): 515–29. doi:10.2307/1916389. JSTOR 1916389.
- Rauch, Steven J. (2006). "Crawford Expedition". The Encyclopedia of the American Revolutionary War: A Political, Social, and Military History. Vol. 1. Santa Barbara, California: ABC-CLIO. pp. 313–15. ISBN 1-85109-408-3.
- Rosenthal, John Rose, Baron de (1894). "Journal of a Volunteer Expedition to Sandusky". The Pennsylvania Magazine of History and Biography. 18 (2).
- Sadosky, Leonard (2001). "Rethinking the Gnadenhutten Massacre: The Contest for Power in the Public World of the Revolutionary Pennsylvania Frontier". In Skaggs, David Curtis; Nelson, Larry L. (eds.). The Sixty Years' War for the Great Lakes, 1754–1814. East Lansing: Michigan State University Press. pp. 187–213. ISBN 0-87013-569-4.
- Silver, Peter (2009). Our Savage Neighbors: How Indian War Transformed Early America. W. W. Norton & Company. ISBN 978-0-393-33490-6.
- Sipe, C. Hale (1999) [1927]. The Indian Chiefs of Pennsylvania. Lewisburg, Pennsylvania: Wennawoods.
- Sosin, Jack M. (1967). The Revolutionary Frontier, 1763–1783. New York: Holt.
- Sugden, John (2000). Blue Jacket: Warrior of the Shawnees. Lincoln: University of Nebraska Press. ISBN 0-8032-4288-3.
- Sugden, John (1999). "Snake". American National Biography. Vol. 20. Oxford University Press. doi:10.1093/anb/9780198606697.article.2001625. ISBN 0-19-512799-4.
- Tanner, Helen Hornbeck, ed. (1987). Atlas of Great Lakes Indian History. University of Oklahoma Press. ISBN 0-8061-2056-8. A source for the maps.
- Trigger, Bruce (1969). The Huron: Farmers of the North. New York: Holt. ISBN 0-03-079550-8.
- Wallace, Paul A. W., ed. (1985). The Travels of John Heckewelder in Frontier America. University of Pittsburgh Press. ISBN 0-8229-5369-2. First published 1958 as Thirty Thousand Miles with John Heckewelder.
- Weslager, C. A. (1972). The Delaware Indians: A History. New Jersey: Rutgers University Press. ISBN 0-8135-1494-0.
