= John B. McClelland =

Executed as captive during American Revolutionary War

- Born: 1734; Lancaster County, Pennsylvania
- Died: 1782 (aged 47–48); Wakatomika, Ohio
- Burial place: Tent Presbyterian Church, Uniontown, Pennsylvania
- Spouse: Martha Dale (m. 1756–1782)
- Children: John McClelland
- Military career
- Allegiance: United States
- Branch: Westmoreland County PA Militia
- Service years: 1776-1782
- Rank: Officer

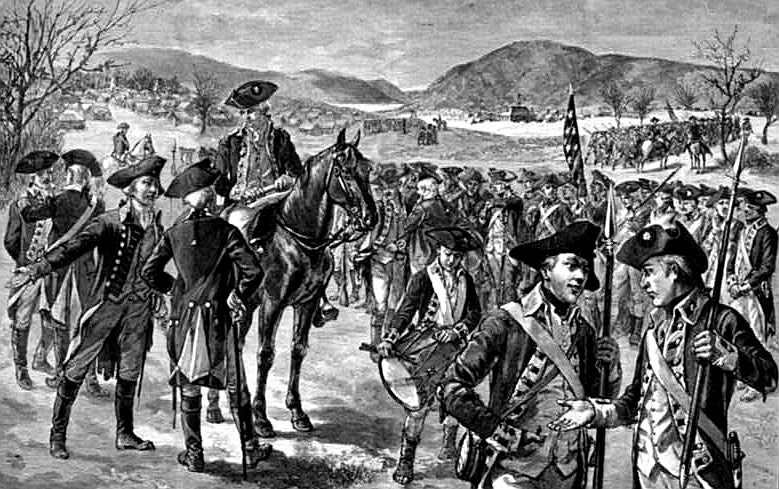
Illustration depicting the Continental Army during the American Revolution

John B. McClelland (1734–1782) was an officer in the American Revolutionary War. He was captured by American Indians during the Crawford Expedition and tortured to death at the Shawnee town of Wakatomika, which is currently located in Logan County, Ohio, about halfway between West Liberty, Ohio and Zanesfield, Ohio.

== Early life and family ==
McClelland was born in Lancaster County, Province of Pennsylvania. Later he moved to Westmoreland County and taking up a tract of land in Franklin Township, lived in that part which fell within Fayette County, Pennsylvania on its organization in 1783. He married Martha Dale on November 12, 1759, and was either the founder or co-founder of McClellandtown, Fayette County, Pennsylvania. He was the father of John McClelland (1766-1849), who helped illustrate the unfair nature of the taxes imposed during the Whiskey Insurrection, and who became an officer during the War of 1812.

== American revolution ==
In 1776, McClelland's Fort, an early army outpost, was built on a cliff near Royal Spring Park, Georgetown, Kentucky. The fort was abandoned in 1777, however, after Indian attacks increased in frequency and severity. John B. McClelland may have been involved in surveying the land, or possibly building a nearby log cabin. Though, it's more likely that a cousin, by the name of John McClelland (1745–1776), was actually responsible. A monument to Scott County's fallen soldiers of the Revolution now marks the location.

John B. McClelland was a member of the commission for the Pennsylvania Constitution of 1776, and later represented Westmoreland County in the Pennsylvania General Assembly. The Convention met in Philadelphia, July 15, 1776, to form a constitution and frame a government for the state of Pennsylvania. A committee of prominent citizens met at Carpenter's Hall, Philadelphia, on June 15, 1776, in order to make arrangements for a convention anticipating the separation of the colonies from Great Britain. Attendants were asked by the committee "to choose such persons only to act for them in the ensuing convention as are distinguished for wisdom, integrity, and a firm attachment to the liberties of this province." In pursuance of this recommendation, delegates were chosen July 5, 1776, and the eight delegates to the convention elected for Westmoreland County were John Moore, Edward Cook, James Perry, James Barr, James Smith, John Carmichael, John McClelland, and Christopher Lobingier.

=== Westmoreland Militia ===
At the outset of the Revolutionary War, McClelland was appointed to a citizen's committee to procure arms and ammunition for the defense of the struggling new nation. On January 28, 1776, a John McClelland enlisted as a private in Captain James Taylor's company of the Fourth Pennsylvania Battalion, a regiment of the Continental Army; however, it doesn't appear that this was the John McClelland from Westmoreland, since Taylor's Company likely was raised in Lancaster County. It is known that at the beginning of the Revolution, John B. McClelland became a captain in the First Battalion of Westmoreland Militia, in 1777 was a captain in the Second Battalion, and on January 3rd, 1778 was elected to Lieutenant Colonel of the Fourth Battalion of Westmoreland Militia. The Westmoreland militia served primarily on the Western Pennsylvania frontier, except for early in 1777, when the First Battalion was deployed to New Jersey for two months under General Washington.

Officers of the Westmoreland Militia met on June 18, 1781, at the home of Captain John McClelland, on Big Sewickley Creek, and by a majority, voted to give aid to General George Rogers Clark. It was resolved to furnish 300 men out of the County Militia to join General Clark's army against the Ohio Native Americans that were allied with the British, for the immediate benefit of the Westmoreland frontier; despite the fact that Clark's real intention was to conquer the British post at Detroit. Although George Washington agreed to transfer a small group of regulars to assist Clark, the detachment under Westmoreland Colonel Archibald Lochry, only numbering about 100 men, was defeated in August 1781 before they could meet up with Clark (see Lochry's Defeat), and effectively put an end to the campaign.

=== Crawford expedition ===
By 1782, the Indians of the frontier allied themselves with the British and started attacking settlers. McClelland was commissioned a Major, and made third in command of an expedition, led by Colonel William Crawford, intended to put an end to Indian attacks on American settlers in that region. In fact, John McClelland was one of four majors elected for the Crawford Expedition. The other Majors included David Williamson (Pennsylvania) of Washington County, Pennsylvania, Thomas Gaddis of Westmoreland (now Fayette), and James Brenton also of Westmoreland County (now part of Washington County, Pennsylvania). By that time, McClelland was certainly no novice in military affairs, having been a Lieutenant-Colonel of the Fourth Battalion of Militia of Westmoreland County, to which he was elected on January 3, 1778. He was a brave and efficient officer, and much respected as a citizen. His election as one of the general officers of the expedition, at Mingo Bottom (present Mingo Junction, Ohio), was evidence of the confidence reposed in him by the volunteers, with many of whom he was personally acquainted.

Upon learning that a British detachment from Detroit was about to join forces with the Wyandot Indian forces, and that a large band of Shawnee warriors had also appeared to the south, Colonel Crawford commenced a retreat, with Major John McClelland leading the way. However, the volunteer army was soon attacked by the Shawnee and Delaware Indians, and suffered severely. McClelland was wounded and fell from his horse. Calling to John Orr, who was near, he told him to take his horse (Orr was on foot) and clear himself, which he did. Orr afterward related that he heard several of the men who were in the conflict say that the horsemen on the retreat rode over McClelland; and it was the general belief that he was killed where he fell. Such, however, was not the case. The remainder of the division became disorganized and panic-stricken and disregarding McClelland's orders to follow the advance in a solid column, did not follow the prescribed route, becoming entangled in the wetlands.

John Slover, one of the guides on the Crawford Expedition, saw McClelland's body at Wapatomica. The Indians had painted his body black, cut him with their tomahawks, and burnt holes with loads of gunpowder into it. His body was cruelly mangled; the blood mixed with gunpowder and was rendered black. McClelland's body, along with the body of William Harrison, Colonel Crawford's son-in-law and the body of young William Crawford, the Colonel's nephew, was dragged approximately two hundred yards outside of the town. The corpses were given to the dogs, except their limbs and heads, which were mounted on poles.

Young William Crawford, William Harrison, and Major John McClelland all lost their lives at the hands of the Delaware and Shawnee Indians. Colonel Crawford was brutally tortured and burnt at the stake. According to Fitzpatrick, the Shawnee Indians were led by Chief Blacksnake.

== Memorial ==
A government-issued marker honoring Lt. Col. John B. McClelland has been installed where his wife, Martha Dale McClelland (1741–1822); son, John B. McClelland (1766–1849); and daughter-in-law, Rachel Orr McClelland (1770–1843), are buried at Tent Presbyterian Church's cemetery.
