= Beth Willis =

Beth Willis may refer to:

- Beth Willis (Neighbours), Neighbours character
- Beth Willis (producer) (born 1978), British television producer

== See also ==
- Elizabeth Willis (disambiguation)
