= Frank Cowan =

American lawyer, medical doctor, writer, and secretary

Frank Cowan (December 11, 1844 – February 12, 1905) was an American lawyer, medical doctor, writer, and secretary to U.S. President Andrew Johnson.

He was born in Greensburg, Pennsylvania to Lucetta Oliver and Edgar Cowan, a local lawyer. He studied at Jefferson College, but faculty there expelled him for a prank. In 1861, however, he moved to Washington, D.C. to join his father, who was newly elected as a United States senator from Pennsylvania. His father gave him a clerk position on the Committee on Patents. During this formative period Cowan studied law (he was admitted in 1865 to the Westmoreland County, Pennsylvania bar), and also became a writer of fiction, poetry, nonfiction, and drama.

In April 1867 President Andrew Johnson appointed the 22-year-old Cowan as his personal secretary for managing land patents. He worked for Johnson for the next year and a half, then opened his own law practice in Washington after Ulysses S. Grant succeeded Johnson. At this time he also started to study medicine at Georgetown Medical College, from which he graduated in 1869. He returned to Greensburg later that year and married Harriet Jack, daughter of U.S. Congressman William Jack. He opened both a law and medical practice there, and also started a newspaper, Frank Cowan's Paper, focused on Western Pennsylvania and which he edited and published for three years.

In 1873 his wife died after childbirth, as would the infant son Jack. Cowan then became ill himself, and after a time sought relief by sailing around the world in 1880-81, and again in 1884-85, writing about Australia, Brazil, Hawaii, India, Korea, and New Zealand.

He gained some notoriety in 1867 when he partnered with Thomas Birch Florence to write and publish a literary hoax. This scheme to sell newspapers for Florence's struggling Georgetown newspaper did cause sales to skyrocket. The hoax claimed the discovery of the body of an Icelandic Christian woman, who had died in 1051, below the Great Falls of the Potomac River, proving that America had been "discovered" five centuries before Christopher Columbus.

In 1904, knowing that he was terminally ill, Cowan conceived another media hoax connected to the Viking hoax of his youth. He contracted a local carpenter, John Walthour, to build him a model of a fire ship, the funeral vessel of Vikings chiefs. He then gave instructions to be buried beneath a tree at the summit Tollgate Hill, from which he would sail symbolically "over the Sea of Appalachia . . . ."

Cowan died in Greensburg and was buried in St. Clair Cemetery. Even his New York Times obituary had to note that his Viking burial had not taken place. After his death, his estate atop Tollgate Hill was donated to the city of Greensburg for use as a park called Mt. Odin. The clubhouse of the golf course there is named for him.

== Works ==
- Curious facts in the history of insects; including spiders and scorpions. A complete collection of the legends, superstitions, beliefs, and ominous signs connected with insects; together with their uses in medicine, art, and as food; and a summary of their remarkable injuries and appearances, nonfiction (Philadelphia: J.B. Lippincott & Co, 1865)
- The Physique of the United States at the Close of the War, nonfiction (1865)
- The Three-Fold Love: A Comedy in Five Acts, drama (1866)
- Zomara: A Romance of Spain, poetry, (Pittsburgh: Stevenson & Foster, 1873)
- Southwestern Pennsylvania in Song and Story with Notes and Illustrations, with an Appendix: The Battle Ballads and Other Poems of Southwestern Pennsylvania, fiction and poetry (Greensburg: privately printed, 1878)
- Revi-Lona : A Romance of Love in a Marvelous Land, fiction (Greensburg: Tribune Press, n.d., 188?)
- Short Stories from Studies of Life in Southwestern Pennsylvania, fiction (Greensburg: Stevenson and Foster, 1881)
- An American Story-book. Short Stories from Studies of Life in Southwestern Pennsylvania, Pathetic, Tragic, Humorous, and Grotesque, fiction (Greensburg: Vogle & Winsheimer, 1881)
- The City of the Royal Palm and Other Poems, poetry (Rio de Janeiro: A. J. Lamoureux & Co., 1884)
- A Visit in Verse to Halemaumau, poetry (Honolulu: P.C. Advertiser Steam Print, 1885)
- Fact and Fancy in New Zealand. The Terraces of Rotomahana; A Poem By Frank Cowan, nonfiction and poetry (Auckland, H. Brett, 1885)
- Australia: A Charcoal Sketch, nonfiction (Greensburg: Press Printing House, 1886)
- At Gettysburg: A Poem, poetry (Greensburg: Vogle & Winsheimer, 1887)
- The Meaning of the Monument: A Poem. Read at the Dedication of the Soldier's Monument. At Braddock, Allegheny County, Pennsylvania, poetry (Pittsburgh: William Johnston, 1887)
- The Principles and Practice of Medicine in Corea, nonfiction (Greensburg: The Oliver Publishing House, 1888)
- What I Saw in India, While on the Wallaby Around the World: Two Lectures with Notes and Illustrations, and a Poem, Entitled, The Taj, nonfiction and poetry (Greensburg: The Oliver Publishing House, 1888)
- Faustina: A Fantasy of Autumn in the Heart of Appalachia, (1888)
- The Taj Mahal : A Poem, poetry (Greensburg: The Oliver Publishing House, 1889)
- The Poetical Works of Frank Cowan : In Three Volumes, poetry (Greensburg: The Oliver Publishing House, 1892)
- A dictionary of the proverbs and proverbial phrases of the English language, relating to the sea and such associated subjects as fish, fishing ... With notes, explanatory, historic, and etymologic, nonfiction (Greensburg: The Oliver Publishing House, 1894)
- David Alter, the Discoverer of Spectrum Analysis: A Sketch of His Life and Labors, nonfiction (Greensburg: The Oliver Publishing House, 1894)
- Andrew Johnson, President of the United States. Reminiscences of his Private Life and Character. By One of His Secretaries (Frank Cowan.), nonfiction (Greensburg: The Oliver Publishing House, 1894)
- Jane Jansen: A Story of a Woman's Heritage in the Heart of Appalachia, nonfiction (Greensburg: The Oliver Publishing House, 1895)
- The Wake of Moichael Cassidy: In the Big Shanty, Mount Odin Park, on Froiday Ayvnin, 26th Aproil, 1901 (1901)
- Check-list of the Fruit-bearing Trees, Shrubs and Vines, Nut, and Other Food-plants in the Park and Orchards of Frank Cowan, Mount Odin Park and Experimental Orchards, Greenesburgh, Westmoreland County, Penn'a, nonfiction (Greenesburgh: The Oliver Publishing House, 1890)
