= Gustave Rosenthal =

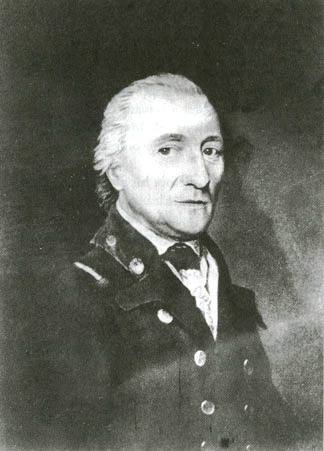
Gustav Heinrich von Wetter-Rosenthal

Gustav Heinrich von Wetter-Rosenthal (1754–1829) was a Baltic German soldier and member of the Baltic nobility born in Vaimõisa, present-day Estonia, with the Title of Baron and last name of von Wetter-Rosenthal, a junior line of the von Wetter-Tegerfelden (von Wetter-Tegervelt). He came into conflict with another man and was forced to flee the country after killing him in a duel. He came to North America, where he served in the Continental Army using the name John Rose.

== Birth, Education, and Early Life ==
Born in 1754, Rosenthal was an aristocrat from a long lineage of Baltic Barons.

Historically, Estonia and Livonia had traded with cities in the Hanseatic League for over 300 years by the time of Rosenthal's birth. The land had been ruled by a small group of Barons for around 500 years, making it more open to trade and interaction with Scandinavia and Europe than the rest of the Russian Empire. However, the Baltic Barons were not as grand as the Russian nobility. Although they lived on landed estates with serfs working their land, the Baltic aristocracy was viewed as more traditional, somewhat provincial, and less opulent than their Russian counterparts.

Rosenthal was born into a long line of tradition, honor, and prestige. While firmly rooted in the Baltic aristocracy, through his maternal line, the Rosenthal family maintained a Swedish title of nobility over 100 years ago by Queen Christina of Sweden. This combined title was considered more prestigious than Russian titles of nobility at the time, as it was older and Russian titles could be purchased. Czarina Catherine II, also known as Catherine the Great, is also said to have favored the Baltic aristocracy over the Russian aristocracy- considering them "superior" by 1774.

Rosenthal was born on his family's estate at Vaimõisa, and spent much of his early life in the manor houses and estates at Vaimõisa and Rosenthal. Gustav was the eldest child of Johann Adolf de Rosenthal, a Baltic baron, and Ulrike von Funcken, who was Swedish. He had two sisters and one younger brother named Karl. In his journal, Gustav seems to be the closest with Karl out of all of his siblings.

Rosenthal was educated at the Knight's Academy in Tallinn. The Knights and nobility of this region were heavily associated with the Teutonic Order, which likely influenced Rosenthal's education while in Tallinn.

By the age of 20, Rosenthal had arrived to the Capital in St. Petersburg to become a member of the czarina's court. It was there where he would get into a duel with an unknown other man, which would cause him to flee to the New World.

== Duel and Exile ==
The name of the man whom Rosenthal killed in the duel is unknown. However, it is evident that he dueled someone who had insulted the honor of an "elderly uncle." The identity of this uncle remains uncertain, but Rosenthal's diary suggests that his aristocratic upbringing significantly influenced his decision to enter the duel and view his "abandonment of his country" as a matter of honor. He considers participating in the duel and his exile in the Americas to be actions mandated by his sense of honor.

Dueling at the czarina's court was illegal and often punishable by death. To save his own life, Rosenthal managed to escape to a ship bound for the Americas, although the specific ship he was on is unknown.

== American Revolution ==
At the time of his departure from Europe, the American Revolution was under way. Arriving in Baltimore in the spring of 1776, Rosenthal adopted the name John Rose. Rose soon began taking classes to train as a surgeon under Dr. C.F. Wiesenthal, who is mistakenly referred to as 'Dr. Wisendorf' in Rose's journal. Wiesenthal was a German physician who operated a surgical school in Baltimore. He spoke the same dialect of German as Rose, which likely helped ease Rose's transition into his new identity as a Continental surgeon.

Wiesenthal was an early advocate for smallpox inoculations and was particularly concerned about the "camp diseases" such as diphtheria and typhus that plagued the Continental Army.

While stationed at Fort Ticonderoga, sometime between late spring of 1776 and December of 1776, Rose befriended William Irvine who was an officer in the Continental Army. While he was still serving as a student of Wiesenthal, he would have been experienced in treatment of smallpox and other camp diseases.

He was present at the Battle of Trois-Rivières, which occurred on June 8, 1776. It is believed that Rose was present during the American invasion of Quebec, likely to perform surgeons' mates' duties due to the especially deadly smallpox outbreak that was plaguing the Continental Army at that time.

In January 1777, Wiesenthal was appointed Surgeon Major of the First Maryland Battalion while Rose was still his student.

Wiesenthal sent Rose to the hospital complex at Yellow Springs to assist Dr. Samuel Kennedy in the maintenance of the facility.

The hospital had been personally commissioned by George Washington, who had passed through Yellow Springs (already a well-known health spa at the time) and had camped there during the Battle of the Clouds. Known as Washington Hall, the hospital at Yellow Springs was the first purpose-built hospital commissioned by Congress. It was also the headquarters for the Hospital Department of the American Revolutionary War.

Upon arrival, Rose found the new hospital only half-built but seemed to hold a fond regard for Dr. Kennedy. His enthusiasm for the patriotic cause, along with his compassionate care for soldiers injured in battles or suffering from illnesses related to Valley Forge, was well noted. Rose served as a surgeon's mate at the hospital.

During his time there, he also met Dr. Bodo Otto, another German physician renowned for his expertise in cutting-edge medicine, particularly smallpox inoculations. Throughout the long winter, Otto, Kennedy, Rose, and numerous other nurses, surgeons, and country doctors worked diligently at Yellow Springs to heal the sick and the dying.

However, by spring, Dr. Kennedy fell ill with typhoid fever. He diagnosed himself, and although Otto wished to treat him with bloodletting and other harsh methods, Kennedy was already frail and unfortunately succumbed to his illness by spring 1778.

The hospital at Yellow Springs continued to care for soldiers for approximately ten more years until its funding was ceased by Congress. After Kennedy's death, Rose seems to have struggled with his duties as a surgeon's mate. He was subsequently court-martialed, and eventually became a privateer on a ship named Revenge.

== Crawford expedition ==
When William Irvine was transferred to the Western Department, Rose accompanied him. Irvine assigned him to the Crawford expedition under the command of Colonel William Crawford against the Upper Sandusky villages of the Wyandots and Delawares in 1782. Irvine ordered Rose to keep a detailed account of the expedition and record all the events. During the election of officers, Rose was elected adjutant with the rank of Major. Upon nearing the destination of the campaign, Rose was selected to lead an advance company of men to scout the area ahead and attempt to determine the location of the enemy. It was Rose who discovered and determined that the grove of trees known as "Battle Island" should be the point of defense for the army during the Battle of Sandusky.

Shortly after leaving the grove, the detachment spotted several Indians. After pursuing them some distance they were ambushed by the hidden force of Native Americans under the Wyandot chief Dunquat, the Delaware chiefs Captain Pipe and Wingenund and the British Indian agent Simon Girty. Rose led the company in a fighting retreat while sending back runners to alert the main army that they had engaged the Indian force. With the advance company retreating and the main army advancing, they met at the grove earlier discovered by Rose.

During the day of June 4 and the following day of June 5, the Indian force surrounded and attacked the army within the grove. Several attempts were made to penetrate the army's perimeter with little success; however, numerous parties of warriors continued to arrive to augment the numbers of the attackers and following the arrival of a number of Butler's Rangers and a party of Shawnee numbering near 200 under the Chief Black Snake, the battle began to go against the Americans.

== Retreat and the Battle of the Olentangy ==
Following the arrival of the British and Indian reinforcements, Colonel Crawford and Colonel David Williamson, the second in command, agreed that a retreat should be attempted on the night of June 5. As the men were preparing to leave the woods, small groups began to leave on their own causing the organized retreat to degenerate into a rout. A large body of men remained together under the leadership of Col David Williamson and Major Rose. The following day, Rose was again selected to lead an advance company to scout the terrain ahead. Later in the day, as the remains of the army approached the Olentangy River to water the horses and rest, the Indians and British attacked initiating the Battle of the Olentangy. After fierce fighting, the Americans were able to push the Indians and British back.

Realizing that the enemy would harass the rear of the army, Rose led the defense of a rear guard which kept the enemy at bay long enough to allow the army to leave the Olentangy River camp. On June 13 the remaining American army crossed the Ohio River into American territory. Rose delivered his report to General Irvine.

== After the war ==
Following the American Revolution John Rose returned to Estonia and married. He raised a family, became head of the Estonian Knighthood and died in 1829 in his Velise manor. His body was laid to the family chappel. The journal which he had kept on the Crawford Expedition was part of his estate when he died. A family member later sent a copy to the Pennsylvania Historical Society giving Americans an excellent account of the campaign.
