= Francis Bailey (publisher) =

American printer and publisher

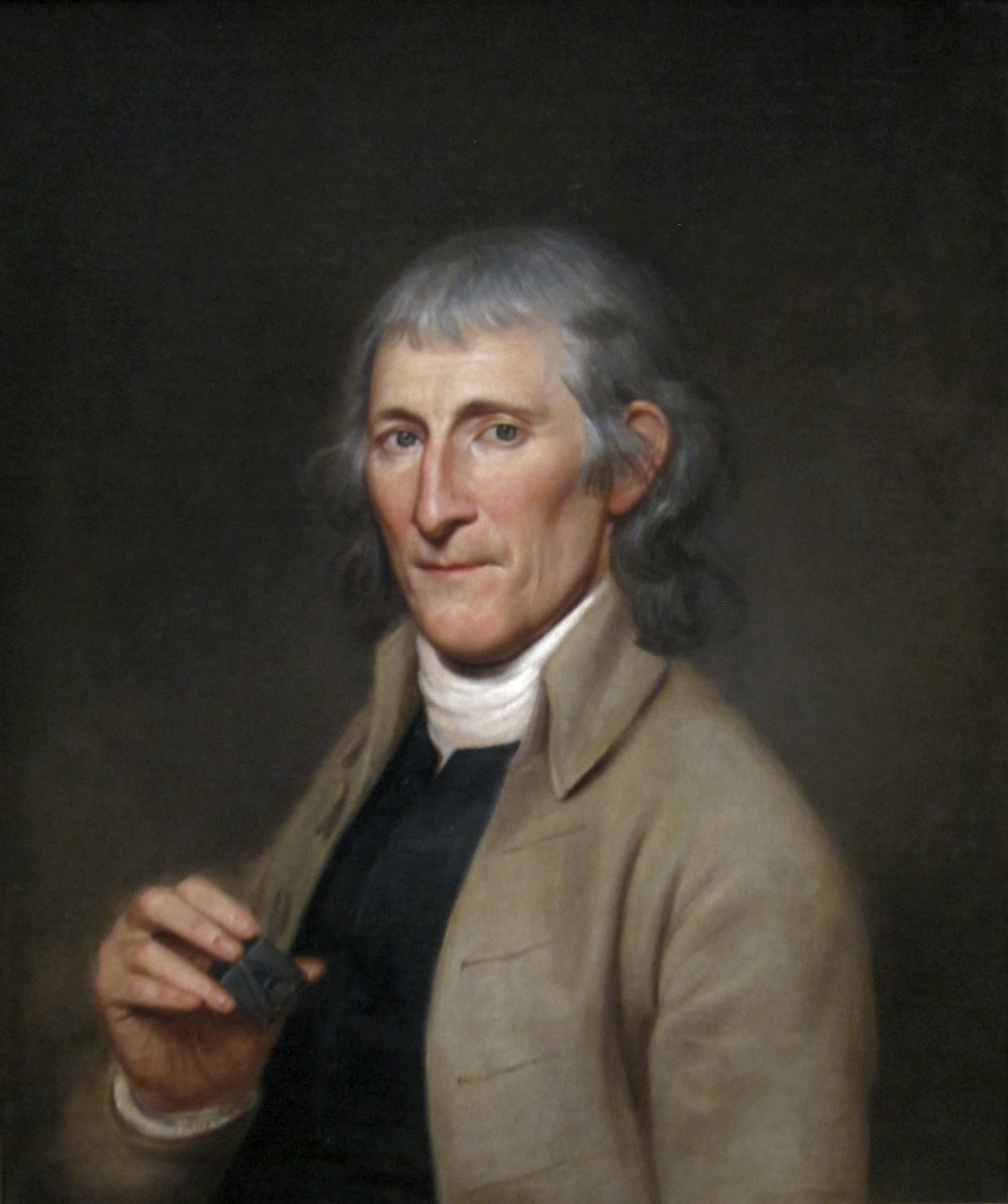
- Bailey, 1791 portrait
- Born: September 3, 1744; Sadsbury Township, Pennsylvania, British America
- Died: November 1, 1817 (aged 73); Philadelphia, Pennsylvania, U.S.
- Occupation: Printer

Francis Bailey (September 3, 1744 – November 1, 1817) was an early American printer, publisher and journalist in Pennsylvania from 1771 to 1807.

He began publication of the Lancaster Almanac in Lancaster, PA in 1771 and published the United States Magazine in 1778. In 1781, he became editor of the Freeman's Journal. In addition to printing editions of the Articles of Confederation and Thomas Paine's Common Sense, he acted as printer for Congress and the Commonwealth of Pennsylvania.

Bailey was the first printer to refer to George Washington, in print, as the Father of His Country. He was also the first to print the first official printing of the first U.S. constitution, then called The Articles of Confederation.

He was the first American publisher of the writings of Emanuel Swedenborg in 1787.

Bailey was taught the printing trade by Peter Miller in Ephrata, Lancaster county. In 1778 or 1779 he removed to Philadelphia where he published a newspaper. Eventually he returned to Lancaster. Bailey's daughter-in-law managed a press shop in Philadelphia in 1818.

== Sources ==
- Thomas, Isaiah (1874). The history of printing in America, with a biography of printers. Vol. I. New York, B. Franklin.
- Stoltzfus, Lee Jay. "Francis Bailey: Lancaster's Favorite Hot-Headed Printer".
