= Thomas Gaddis =

Continental Army officer (1742–1834)

Thomas Gaddis (December 28, 1742 – June 10, 1834) was a militia officer in the American Revolutionary War. He was born in Winchester, Frederick County, Virginia, and married Hannah Rice in 1764; the same year he built Fort Gaddis, a refuge from attacks by Native Americans, located on the Catawba Trail. In fact, Pennsylvania and Virginia had conflicting claims in the area Gaddis settled. Though he maintained his loyalty to Virginia, Gaddis also protected his investment by recording his patent with Pennsylvania authorities. By 1773, both states created new geopolitical boundaries in recognition of increased white settlement. Pennsylvania formed Westmoreland County out of the larger Bedford County, and Virginia established the District of West Augusta. In 1776, West Augusta was further divided into three counties: Ohio, Yohogania, and Monongalia, where Gaddis and his family resided.

Pennsylvania State Regiment Uniform (American Revolutionary War) Note: Gaddis served in the Monongalia County, Virginia militia, not the Pennsylvania State Regiment.

Thomas Gaddis was appointed captain of the Monongalia County militia on August 23, 1776. By September 9, he had raised a company of militia and proceeded to build what was afterward known as Fort Liberty in Monongalia County (two miles south of present-day Uniontown, PA, at Fort Gaddis), where they were stationed from September 1776 to January 1777. However, some historical texts have confused this fort with another Fort Liberty that was located along the Ohio River (present-day West Liberty, West Virginia) and a fort located at Beech Bottom, West Virginia, which also was constructed by Gaddis and his militia company,, located about ten miles north of Fort Henry (West Virginia). On February 17, 1777, Gaddis was commissioned as lieutenant colonel of Monongalia County by Patrick Henry, Governor of Virginia, and took command of Prickett's Fort, Fort Scott, Fort Stradler, Fort Jackson, and Fort Lindley. Shortly afterward, he was promoted to full colonel.

In August 1777, Gaddis and Colonel Zackquill Morgan learned that a substantial number of settlers in the Redstone area, a region south of Pittsburgh, had taken an oath of allegiance to the Monarchy of the United Kingdom and were plotting on Great Britain's behalf. Gaddis informed Lieutenant Colonel Thomas Brown at Redstone Old Fort, on the Monongahela River, requesting him to place an extra guard on the powder magazine. In a dispatch to Brown, he wrote:

Dear Sir,

A certain person was at my house on Monday the 25th last, and he made oath to me that the Tories have joined themselves together for to cut off the inhabitants, and we know not what hour they will rise. Therefore it would be proper that you would take a particular care and keep a strong guard over the Magazine for a few days, till we can use some means with them. This day I am starting with a party of men for to succor the people and suppress the Tories. I would desire that you would do your utmost endeavor and warn the friends of our country to be upon their watch.

Sir, I remain respectfully your friend,

Thos. Gaddis

The loyalists planned to seize the magazine at Redstone, but Brown mustered a guard of fifteen men, and a militia force of a hundred patriots under Gaddis and Captain Henry Enoch captured twelve tories and scattered the remainder. The prisoners were escorted to Virginia's capital in Williamsburg, took an oath of allegiance, and eventually returned home.

With the hope of putting an end to Indian attacks on American settlers, Gaddis took part in General Lachlan McIntosh's expedition into the Ohio Country in September to December 1778. He raised a company of militia to assist in the construction of Fort McIntosh and Fort Laurens, but to no avail. By the spring of 1782, however, he was a resident of Westmoreland County, Pennsylvania, his home being in that part that in 1783 became Fayette County, Pennsylvania, about three miles south of Uniontown, Pennsylvania.

Gaddis was elected a field major and third in command of the Sandusky Expedition, seeing as he was well known to many of the volunteers as a good citizen and brave soldier. At the time of his volunteering for the campaign, he was an officer of the militia of Westmoreland County. The other majors of the expedition, committed to destroying Indian towns along the Sandusky River, included David Williamson, John B. McClelland, and James Brenton.

Regretfully, the Indians and their British allies had already learned of the expedition, and the Americans were forced to retreat. During the retreat, Colonel William Crawford and several of his men, including Major John B. McClelland; William Harrison, Colonel Crawford's son-in-law; and young William Crawford, the colonel's nephew, were captured and tortured to death. Approximately seventy Americans were killed in the 1782 campaign on the western front. Gaddis returned safely from the engagement.

On June 14, 1782, the officers dispersed to their various places of residence. Gaddis returned to that part of Westmoreland, soon to become Fayette. Afterward, he maintained his prominence in government affairs, filling honorable offices both civil and military. Aside from working as a cabinetmaker as well as owning a tavern and distillery, Gaddis was actively involved in the establishment of the Fayette County court system, serving on the first Fayette County grand jury. He was Fayette County Commissioner from 1787 to 1789 and served as a delegate for Washington, Fayette, and Allegheny Counties, Pennsylvania, during the Whisky Insurrection.

In fact, Gaddis was the principal leader of the "Whiskey Boys," a group of citizens who were enraged that Congress had imposed a tax on whiskey to pay government bondholders. While smaller distilleries were to pay taxes by the gallon, larger distillers could take advantage of a flat fee, clearly putting the smaller distilleries at a disadvantage. Their dissatisfaction derived, at least in part, from the very same factors that characterized their experience leading up to the Revolutionary War: a sense of isolation and alienation from government authorities who failed to represent or consider their special needs and interests.

The excise tax, passed in July 1791, placed a burden on western farmers who converted excess grain into whiskey, which was easier to transport and much more marketable. Despite continued petitions from western counties, the United States Congress refused to repeal the excise act, and westerners responded by ignoring the tax, harassing tax collectors, destroying property, and raising liberty poles. In July 1794, 7,000 local militiamen organized to march on the town of Pittsburgh, whose citizens they believed supported the tax. The mob was appeased with the banishment of several of the most offensive townspeople, but news of the uprising prompted George Washington to call up a 15,000-man force to march on Western Pennsylvania. By the time the troops finally approached Pittsburgh, in October, the rebel army had already dispersed. Federal officers arrested 150 men they identified as being involved in the rebellion. Of these, twenty-four were taken to Philadelphia for trial, but only two were convicted and were then given presidential pardons.

In the summer of 1794, Thomas Gaddis' home was the site of a liberty pole raising, a public protest event usually attended by a crowd of insurgents who raised a pole carrying a banner inscribed with a slogan such as "Liberty and No Excise!" Liberty poles were raised each night along the route followed by federal troops toward Pittsburgh. Gaddis was accused of a misdemeanor for raising a liberty pole on his farm. Most likely, his offense was covered in the general pardon President Washington and Pennsylvania Governor Thomas Mifflin issued to those implicated in the insurrection and who had not subsequently been indicted or convicted. The excise tax remained virtually impossible to collect in Western Pennsylvania. It was repealed by Thomas Jefferson in 1800.

Thomas Gaddis lived in Fayette County for twenty years after the Rebellion. He and his wife, Hannah, joined the Great Bethel Baptist Church in Uniontown, Pennsylvania, and contributed to the building of its first church, although Gaddis was excommunicated for differing with church doctrine before the building was completed. In 1814, Gaddis sold his farm and relocated to Union Township, Clinton County, Ohio, where he died June 10, 1834. The original Gaddis homestead is listed on the National Register of Historic Places in Fayette County, Pennsylvania.
