= Catawba Trail =

North American trade route

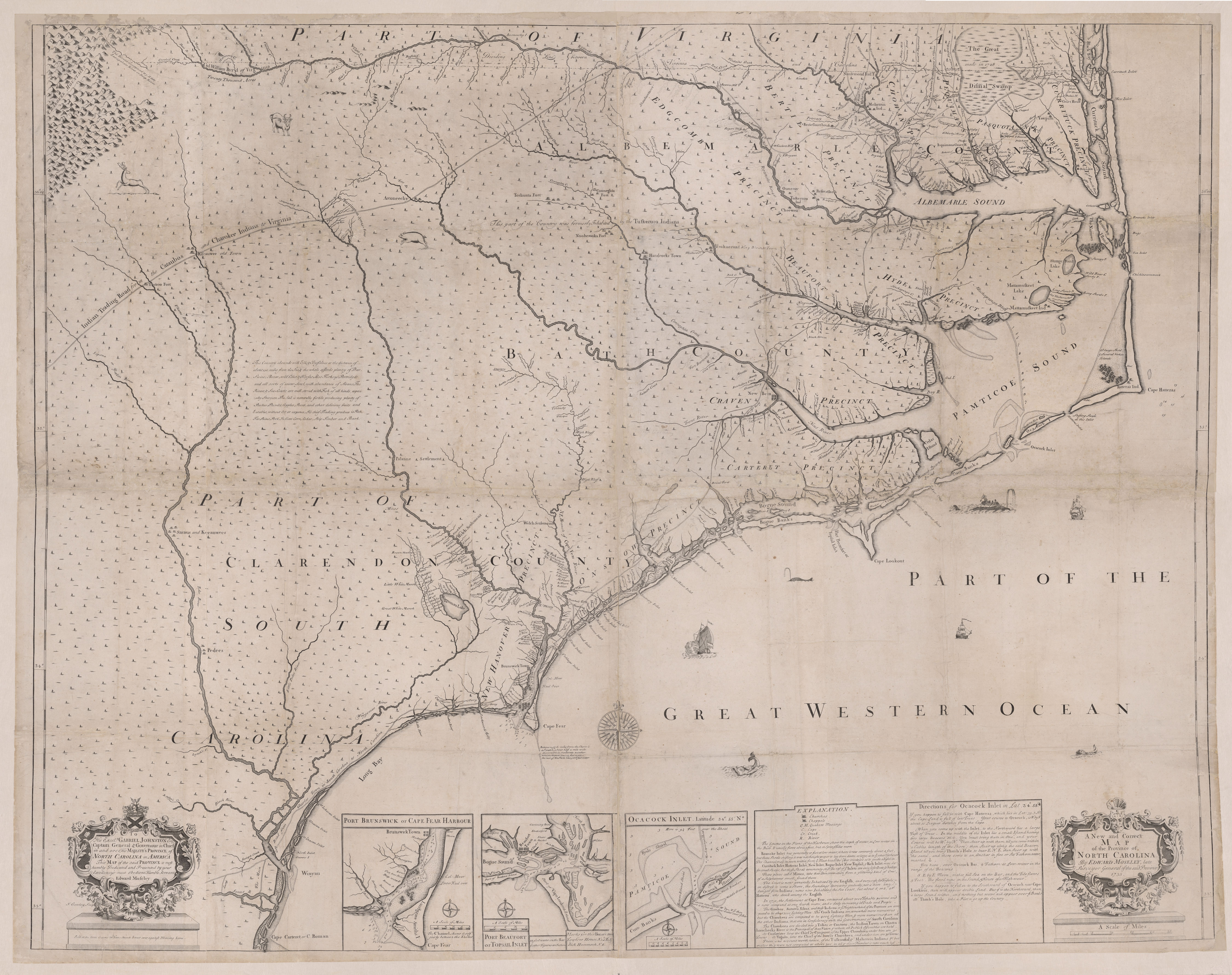
Catawba Trail on the 1733 Moseley map of North Carolina

The Catawba Trail is a trail developed and used by Native Americans that leads from the Carolinas northerly into Ohio, Indiana and Pennsylvania. Named for the Catawba people, several branches led from western Virginia, through West Virginia, Kentucky, and eastern Tennessee. It is a part of the Great Indian Warpath. Its South Carolina and North Carolina origination, sometimes called the Old Buncombe Road, passes through the Unaka Mountains and the Allegheny Mountains.

This south and northerly wilderness way was used by the ancient Native Americans of the regions for trade exchange and raiding at various times and by various cultures from antiquity. The Catawba Trail of the Cumberland Mountains and Ouasioto Mountains in south western West Virginia intersects the Appalachian Trail. A major trail that it crossed has been developed into the Appalachian Trail, today.
