= David Williamson (soldier) =

Colonel of American militia

David Williamson (1752–1814) was a mass murderer and colonel in the Pennsylvania Militia during the American Revolutionary War. He was born near Carlisle, Pennsylvania, and led American militiamen in the Gnadenhutten massacre of the Moravian Christian Indian Martyrs, though he failed in his plan to massacre the Christian Indians (primarily Lenape and Mahican) in Schoenbrunn. He led Pennsylvanian soldiers in the massacre of peaceful Delaware Indians in Killbuck Island (who were allies of the United States) and was second in command in the Crawford expedition.

== Involvement in mass murder of Christian Indians ==
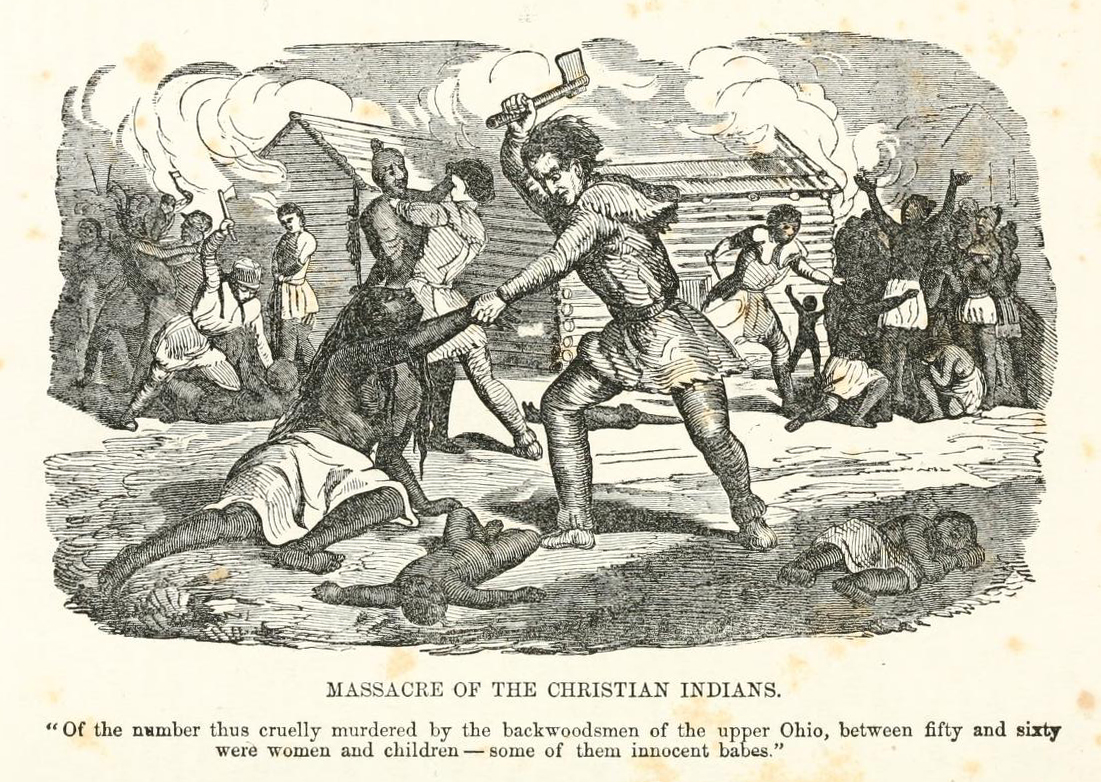
Gnadenhutten massacre in 1782

David Williamson led the American soldiers that murdered 100 pacifist Moravian Christian Indians at the town of Gnadenhutten, Ohio in 1782. It became known as the Gnadenhutten massacre. An account of the persecution of the Moravian Christian Indian Martyrs that described Williamson read as follows: "One Indian [Christian Lenape] female, who could speak good English, fell upon her knees before Williamson, the Commander, and begged most eloquently and piteously for his protection; but all her supplications and pleadings were unheeded by the heartless and dastardly wretch, who ordered her to prepare for death."

After the Gnadenhutten massacre, Williamson advanced his unit to massacre the Moravian Christian Indians who were peacefully harvesting their crops in Schoenbrunn. Williamson's plan failed as one of the residents of Schoenbrunn was on his way to deliver a message from David Zeisberger to the Moravian Brethren in Gnadenhutten when he saw the scalped body of Joseph Schebosh, a Moravian of both Welsh and Lenape ancestry that Williamson's soldiers had murdered upon their arrival to Gnadenhutten. The Moravian Indian Christian messenger quickly buried Schebosh's body and hurried back to Schoenbrunn to warn them. The Moravian Brethren of Schoenbrunn quickly departed the village for Sandusky and by the time Williamson and his soldiers arrived, there was no one in Schoenbrunn for them to kill.

As Williamson and his unit were returning from the Gnadenhutten massacre of the Moravian Christian Indian martyrs, he and his militiamen massacred the peaceful Delaware Indians at Killbuck Island, where forty of them were living. These Indians were allies of the United States and provided intelligence to the Americans at the nearby Fort Pitt. Chief Gelelemend and a few others (mainly women and children), in addition to a Christian Indian named Anthony who was in Pittsburgh, were able to escape by swimming away; they headed to Upper Sandusky and joined the Christian Munsee, with Chief Gelelemend becoming a prominent member among the Moravians. Thirty U.S.-friendly Delaware Indians perished during the massacre at Killbuck Island.

== Crawford expedition and the Battle of Olentangy ==
He was also second in command of the Crawford expedition which was defeated by the combined Native American and British force at the Battle of Sandusky on June 4–6, 1782 near the Wyandot village of Upper Sandusky, Ohio. He led the majority of the remaining force home and was in command during the subsequent Battle of Olentangy during the retreat home on June 6, 1782.

== Later life and death ==
Following the war, Williamson was elected to several terms as sheriff of Washington County, Pennsylvania; however, his attempts at various business ventures failed and he died in poverty in 1814.
