= Buckongahelas =

Lenape chief

Buckongahelas (c. 1720 – May 1805) together with Little Turtle and Blue Jacket, achieved the greatest victory won by Native Americans, killing 600. He was a regionally and nationally renowned Lenape chief, councilor and warrior. He was active from the days of the French and Indian War (Seven Years' War) through the Northwest Indian Wars, after the United States achieved independence and settlers encroached on territory beyond the Appalachian Mountains and Ohio River. The chief led his Lenape band from present-day Delaware westward, eventually to the White River area, founding Muncie, Indiana.

== Early life and education ==
Buckongahelas was born in present-day Delaware around the year 1720 to Lenape parents. The British colonists called the people the Delaware, after the river, which was the heart of their territory. The Algonquian-speaking Lenape lived throughout the mid-Atlantic area. Buckongahelas in the Lenape language means a "Giver of Presents." He was also known as Pachgantschihilas and Petchnanalas, meaning a "fulfiller" or "one who succeeds in all he undertakes."

== Marriage and family ==
Buckongahelas married as a young man and started his family. Under pressure from colonial settlers, he began to move his band westward. He was believed to have lived some time with his people in what is now Buckhannon in Upshur County, West Virginia.

His son Mahonegon was killed there in June 1773 by Captain William White, a native of Frederick County, Virginia. Local legend states that the current Upshur County Courthouse was built over the grave of Mahonegon. Local legend suggests Buckongahelas took revenge on White after trailing his son's killer for a period of nine years (1773–1782). The captain was killed March 8, 1782 within sight of Bush Fort in the vicinity of the Buckhannon River. But, historic documentation places Buckongahelas in Ohio by 1781, as he was moving his band west to escape European-American encroachment.

== American Revolutionary War ==
During the American Revolutionary War, Buckongahelas led his followers against the Continentals. He broke away from the neutral and pro-American Lenape led by White Eyes. He took his band west to establish a town near the war chief Blue Jacket of the Shawnee. The two men became close allies.

During the war years, a number of Lenape who had converted to Christianity were living in frontier villages run by Moravian missionaries. In April 1781, at the Ohio village of Gnadenhütten, Buckongahelas warned the Lenape that an American militia from Pennsylvania was likely to execute any Indians in their path and would not pay attention to their Christian pacifism. He urged the pacifists to follow him further west away from the encroaching Americans. Moving westward "from the rising sun," the people could live where the land was good and his warriors would protect them. The Christian Lenape did not heed his words.

John Heckewelder, a Moravian missionary, wrote in his account that Buckongahelas' oration to the Christian Indians was told "with ease and an eloquence not to be imitated." He continued, "Eleven months after this speech was delivered by this prophetic chief, ninety-six of these same Christian Indians, about sixty of them women and children, were murdered at the place where these very words had been spoken, by the same men he had alluded to, and in the same manner that he had described." On March 8, 1782, state militia attacked and killed the Lenape in what is known as the Gnadenhütten massacre.

== Post-war tensions ==
In the Treaty of Paris (1783) that ended the Revolutionary War, the British ceded Indian lands in the Ohio Country that were not theirs to the United States. In the late 1780s, Buckongahelas joined a Shawnee-led confederacy to try to repel the American settlers who had begun migrating west of the Appalachian Mountains, using the Ohio River to penetrate the territory.

They won several battles against the Americans in the Northwest Indian Wars, with British support. Buckongahelas led his warriors to win the most devastating military victory ever achieved by Native Americans in the United States, in 1791 against General Arthur St. Clair, who lost 600 troops. The Lenape described Buckongahelas as their own George Washington. Standing 5 feet, 10 inches tall, he was strong with powerful muscles and was said to resemble the statesman Benjamin Franklin.

The Indian confederacy was finally defeated at the Battle of Fallen Timbers in 1794. The British failed to support the Indian confederacy after this battle, and Buckongahelas signed the Treaty of Greenville on August 3, 1795. By this treaty, his band and other Lenape ceded much land in Pennsylvania and Ohio to the United States. At times, competing tribes tried to control the lands and villages, and it was not clear that the chiefs who signed the treaties had authority over the lands they were ceding.

On June 7, 1803, Buckongahelas signed the Treaty of Fort Wayne in Indiana; the US set new boundaries for the Lenape and other nations. They also ceded salt springs. Algonquian tribes ceded large land tracts to the United States. Lastly, he signed the Treaty of Vincennes on August 18, 1804, in Vincennes, Indiana. The Lenape ceded lands between the Ohio and Wabash rivers. The treaty helped open the Ohio and Indiana territories to European-American settlement. Not able to read and write, Buckongahelas made "X" signatures on the three treaties.

Buckongahelas spent his final years living with his people on the White River near present-day Muncie, Indiana. He died in May 1805 at the age of 85 from smallpox or influenza.

Many local Native Americans thought the epidemics of fatal illnesses to be related to witchcraft, as their traditional remedies and medicine men had no effect on the course of the diseases. They conducted a witch-hunt and executed several Lenape suspected of witchcraft. The conditions of defeat and despair were the grounds for the rise of the Shawnee prophet Tenskwatawa, who promised renewed power for the American Indians against the European Americans. His brother Tecumseh became an influential chief leading a new Indian confederacy against the Americans in the early 19th century.

=== Namesakes ===
- Buckhannon, West Virginia
- Buckhannon River

== Legacy and honors ==
- Chief Buckongahelas' loss of his son Mahonegon was memorialized in a 650-pound bronze statue installed in Buckhannon's Jawbone Run Park, because settlers admired his alliance with British colonists during the Seven Years' War. The statue depicts the chief cradling the body of his son. Ross Straight of Buckhannon, WV created the sculpture.

== Popular culture references ==
- The killing of the chief's son was represented in the historical romance novel The Scout of the Buckongehanon (1927), written by John Camillus McWhorter (1866–1937), a judge in Buckhannon.

== See also ==
- Frontier warfare during the American Revolution
