= Western theater of the American Revolutionary War =

Area of conflict west of the Appalachian Mountains

Western theater
- Part of the American Revolutionary and Indian Wars
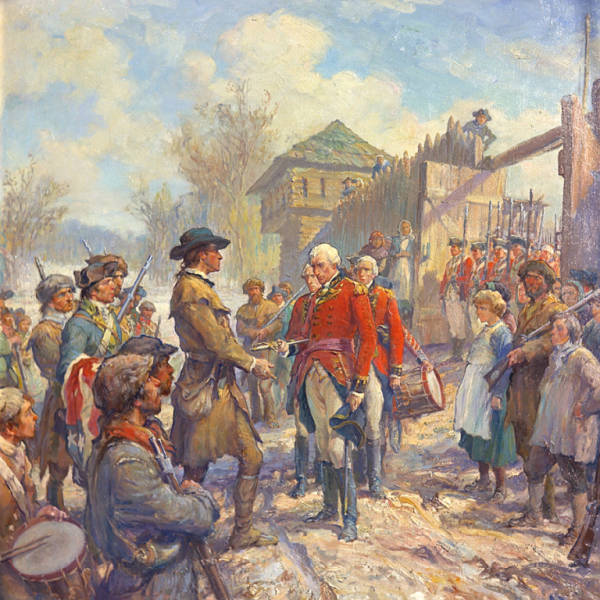
- The Fall of Fort Sackville by F. C. Yohn shows the British surrender of Fort Sackville at Vincennes to George Rogers Clark, marking the beginning of the end of British domination in America’s western frontier.
Date	October 1775–March 1782 (7 years and 5 months)
Location	Great Lakes region, Ohio River valley, and the Spanish province of Louisiana
Result	American strategic victory

Belligerents
United Colonies (1775–1776); United States (1776–1782); Spain (from 1779); Quapaw (from 1779)	Great Britain; Chickasaw; Shawnee; Miami; Lenape; Seneca; Wyandot

Commanders and leaders
(United States) George Rogers Clark (United States) William Crawford (executed) (United States) de La Balme † (Spanish Empire) Fernando de Leyba (Spanish Empire) Francisco Cruzat	(Kingdom of Great Britain) Henry Hamilton (surrendered) (Kingdom of Great Britain) Arent DePeyster; Blackfish †; Cornstalk †; Captain Pipe

Strength
700+	600+

Casualties and losses
120+	40+

The western theater of the American Revolutionary War (1775–1783) was the area of conflict west of the Appalachian Mountains, the region which became the Old Northwest of the United States as well as what would become the states of Arkansas, Kentucky, Louisiana, Missouri, and Tennessee. The western war was fought between Indigenous peoples with their British allies in Detroit, and American settlers south and east of the Ohio River, and also the Spanish as allies of the latter.

== Background ==
At the conclusion of the French and Indian War (1754–1763), Great Britain won uncontested influence over the region between its Atlantic Coast colonies and the Mississippi River. The Ohio River marked a tenuous border between the Thirteen Colonies and the Native American groups of the Ohio Country. The Proclamation of 1763 forbade white colonists from settling west of the Appalachian Mountains in order to prevent conflict between Native Americans and white settlers newly acquired territory after the French defeat. White settlers and land speculators in Britain and the American colonists objected to this restriction, since many had fought against the French and their indigenous allies to gain access to that land. British officials negotiated two treaties with Native Americans in 1768, the Treaty of Fort Stanwix and the Treaty of Hard Labour, opened land for white settlement south of the Ohio River. Thereafter, tensions between British officials and colonists over western land policy diminished.

Tensions grew in the Ohio Valley. The Grand Ohio Company was built on speculation in Native American lands, and Great Britain granted tracts of Native land to veterans of the French and Indian War to pay debts. But in 1772, Great Britain redeployed many of its western forces to the East Coast due to the increasing tensions with the colonists, removing a deterrent to illegal white squatters. In 1774, Great Britain determined that these land grants could not be given to colonial veterans, meaning that colonial veterans who had invested heavily in land speculation (such as George Washington) would lose their investment. That same year, the Quebec Act placed the lands between the Ohio River and Great Lakes under the jurisdiction of Quebec. That Spring, a group of settlers led by Daniel Greathouse committed the Yellow Creek massacre, in which thirteen Native women and children were killed, including the wife and pregnant sister of Tachnechdorus, who had been friendly to settlers until that time. In a particularly brutal act, Koonay, the sister of Tachnechdorus, was strung up by the wrists while her unborn baby was impaled. Tachnechdorus took revenge for the atrocity. He was supported by the Shawnee, who had still not been paid for their lands. Still other Shawnee fled the Scioto River valley, avoiding the anticipated war with the white settlers who suddenly surrounded them.

Most of the Native Americans who lived and hunted in the Ohio Valley, Shawnees, Mingos, Lenape, and Wyandots, had not been consulted in the 1768 treaties. Angry with the Iroquois for selling their lands to the British, Shawnees began to organize a confederacy of western Native peoples with the intention of preventing the loss of their lands. British and Iroquois officials worked to diplomatically isolate the Shawnees from other Native nations, however, and so when Dunmore's War broke out in 1774, Shawnees faced the Virginia militia with few allies. After Virginia's victory in the war, the Shawnees were compelled to accept the Ohio River boundary. Shawnee and Mingo leaders who did not agree with these terms renewed the struggle soon after the American Revolutionary War began in 1775.

== 1775 to 1776: Neutrality and small raids ==
Initially, both the British and the Continental Congress sought to keep Native Americans in the west out of the war. At Fort Pitt in October 1775, American and Native American leaders reaffirmed the boundary established by Dunmore's War the previous year. Without British support, indigenous leaders such as Chief Blackfish (Shawnee) and Pluggy (Mingo) raided into what is now Kentucky, hoping to drive out the white settlers. Governor Patrick Henry of Virginia wanted to retaliate by attacking Pluggy's Town in the Ohio Country, but he canceled the expedition for fear that the militia would be unable to distinguish between neutral and hostile Native Americans, and thus make enemies of the neutral Lenape (also Delaware) and Shawnees. Nevertheless, Shawnees and Lenape became increasingly divided over whether or not to take part in the war. While leaders such as White Eyes (Lenape) and Cornstalk (Shawnee) urged neutrality, Buckongahelas (Lenape) and Blue Jacket (Shawnee) decided to fight against the Americans.

In Kentucky, isolated white settlers and hunters became the frequent target of attacks by Native Americans defending their territory, compelling many white settlers to return to the East. By late spring of 1776, fewer than 200 colonists remained in Kentucky, primarily at the fortified settlements of Boonesborough, Harrodsburg, and Logan's Station. In December 1776, Pluggy was killed in an attack on McClellan's Station, which was located on the site of presentday Georgetown, Kentucky.

== 1776: Opening battle of the war ==
The Battle of Island Flats, at Eaton's station, (Note: Also: "Battle of Long Island Flats," "Battle at Long Island of the Holston," and "Battle of Eaton's Station") was the opening battle of the American War of Independence in the west. The battle was fought in July 1776—shortly after the United States had declared its independence from Britain. It pitted the American Patriot militia and a small force of regulars, against the British-allied Cherokee warriors, who launched a three-pronged attack against the frontier inhabitants in the Overmountain region of the Washington District. On July 20, 1776, they started their campaign against the settlers at the lowlands across from Long Island on the Holston. The frontiersmen had been warned ahead of time by messengers sent from the Cherokee diplomat, Nancy Ward.

Following Cherokee chiefs Dragging Canoe (also Tsiyu Gansini), The Raven (also Savanukah), and Oconostota (all three of whom were experienced warriors), but lacking the element of surprise, the Cherokees were quickly routed, took several casualties, and had to withdraw. Red Chief Dragging Canoe, who led the attack on Eaton's station, was badly wounded, but survived. The other two battles were fought later in the day: Oconostota at Watauga, and The Raven at Carter's valley. The Raven had some success in driving out the inhabitants of Carter's Valley, as fleeting as it was; but Oconostota's force was also routed.

== 1777: Escalation ==
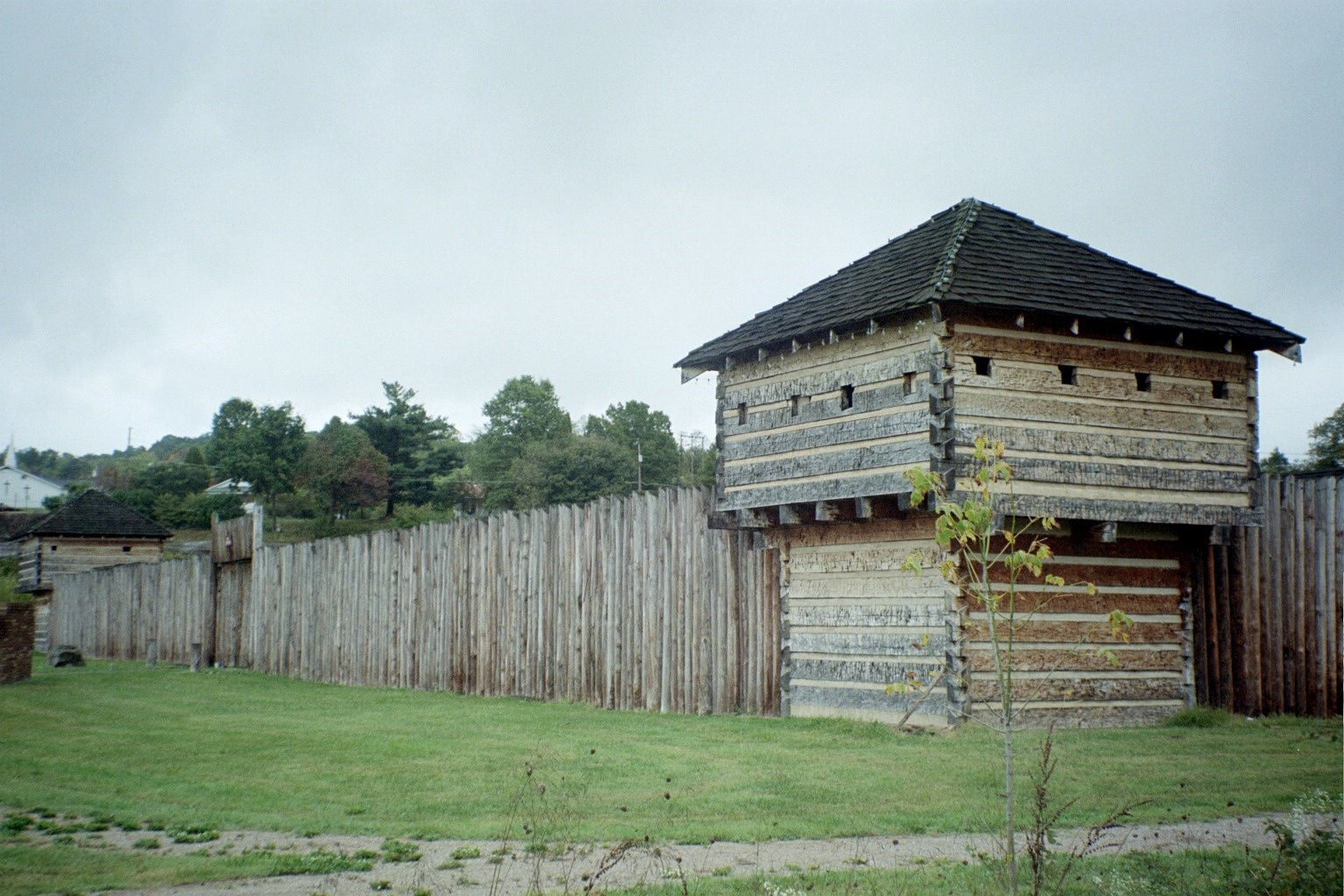
A modern replica of Fort Randolph, which Americans built along the Ohio River in 1776. Dunquat, the Wyandot "Half King," besieged the fort in May 1778.

In 1777, the British launched the Saratoga campaign from Canada. In order to provide a strategic diversion for operations in the Northeast, officials in Detroit began recruiting and arming Indian war parties to raid American settlements. Unknown numbers of American settlers in present Kentucky, West Virginia, and Pennsylvania were killed in these raids. The intensity of the conflict increased after enraged American militiamen murdered Cornstalk, the leading advocate of Shawnee neutrality, in November. Despite the violence, many Ohio Indians still hoped to stay out of the war. This was a difficult task because they were located directly between the British in Detroit and the Americans along the Ohio River.

== 1778 to 1779: American advances ==
In the early years of the war, the Virginians had attempted to defend their western border with militiamen garrisoning three forts along the Ohio River—Fort Pitt, Fort Henry, and Fort Randolph. Defending such a long border proved to be futile, however, because American Indians simply bypassed the forts during their raids. In 1778, the Americans decided that offensive operations were necessary to secure their western border.

In September 1778, the United States negotiated the Treaty of Fort Pitt and secured Lenape support for an attack on Detroit the following month. The campaign was abandoned after the death of Lenape leader White Eyes.

=== Problems at Fort Pitt ===
The first American expedition into the Ohio Country was a debacle. In February 1778, General Edward Hand led 500 Pennsylvania militiamen from Fort Pitt on a surprise winter march towards Mingo towns on the Cuyahoga River, where the British stored military supplies which they distributed to Indian raiding parties. Adverse weather conditions prevented the expedition from reaching its objective, however. On the return march, some of Hand's men attacked neutral Lenape Indians, killing one man and a few women and children, including relatives of the Lenape chief Konieschquanoheel (also Captain Pipe). Because only non-combatants had been killed, the expedition became derisively known as the "squaw campaign".

Besides unruly militia, Loyalist sentiment around Pittsburgh also contributed to Hand's problems. In March, three men with close ties to the British and American Indians left Pittsburgh, defecting to the British and Indian side. They were Simon Girty, an interpreter who had guided the "squaw campaign", Matthew Elliot, a local trader, and Alexander McKee, an agent for the British Indian Department. All three would prove to be valuable British operatives in the war. Amid much criticism, and facing a congressional investigation for allowing the men to defect, Hand resigned in May.

=== Treaty making and fort building ===
Following the escalation of the war in 1777, Americans on the western frontier appealed to the Continental Congress for protection. After an investigation, a Congressional commission recommended in early 1778 that two regiments of the Continental Army be stationed in the West. Furthermore, because a defensive line of forts had little effect on Indian raids into the American settlements, the commissioners called for a fort to be built on the Indian side of the Ohio River, the first in a line of forts which would enable the Americans, it was hoped, to mount an expedition against Detroit.

Hollidays Cove Fort was a Revolutionary War fortification constructed in 1774 by soldiers from Ft. Pitt. It was located in what is now downtown Weirton, West Virginia, along Harmons Creek (named for Harmon Greathouse), about three miles from its mouth on the Ohio River. It was commanded by Colonel Andrew Van Swearingen (1741–1793) and later by his son-in-law, Captain Samuel Brady (1756–1795), the famous leader of Brady's Rangers. In 1779, over 28 militia were garrisoned at Hollidays Cove. Two years earlier in 1777, Colonel Van Swearingen led a dozen soldiers by longboat down the Ohio to help rescue the inhabitants of Fort Henry in Wheeling in a siege by the British and Indian tribes. That mission was memorialized in a WPA-era mural painted on the wall of the Cove Post Office by Charles Shepard Chapman (1879–1962). The mural features Col. John Bilderback, who later gained infamy as the leader of the massacre of the pacifist Indians in Gnadenhutten in 1782.

In order to build a fort in the Ohio Country, the Americans sought the approval of the Lenape Indians. In September 1778, Americans negotiated the Treaty of Fort Pitt with the Lenape, which resulted in the building of Fort Laurens along the Tuscarawas River. American plans soon went awry, however. Koquethagechton (Also White Eyes), the Lenape leader who had negotiated the treaty, was apparently murdered in 1778 by American militiamen. His rival, Captain Pipe, eventually abandoned the American alliance and moved west to the Sandusky River, where he began receiving support from the British in Detroit. Furthermore, because of intense warfare in eastern Pennsylvania and upstate New York, Congress was unable to provide the manpower for operations against Detroit. Fort Laurens was abandoned in 1779.

=== Clark's Illinois campaign ===
In late 1778, George Rogers Clark, a young Virginia militia officer, launched a campaign to seize the sparsely garrisoned Illinois Country from the British. With a company of volunteers, Clark captured the former French village of Kaskaskia, the chief post in the Illinois Country, on July 4, and other nearby villages and later secured the submission of Vincennes. Vincennes was recaptured by General Henry Hamilton, the British commander at Detroit. In February 1779, Clark marched to Vincennes in a surprise winter march and captured Hamilton himself.

To American frontiersmen, Hamilton was known as "the Hair-buyer General" because, they believed, he encouraged Indians to kill and scalp American civilians. For this reason, Governor Thomas Jefferson brought Hamilton to Williamsburg, Virginia, to be tried as a war criminal. After British officials threatened to retaliate against American prisoners of war, Jefferson relented, and Hamilton was exchanged for an American prisoner in 1781.

Although Clark's forces captured and held outposts in the lower areas of the territory, British forces maintained control of Fort Lernoult (Detroit).

== 1780: Major British and Indian offensive ==
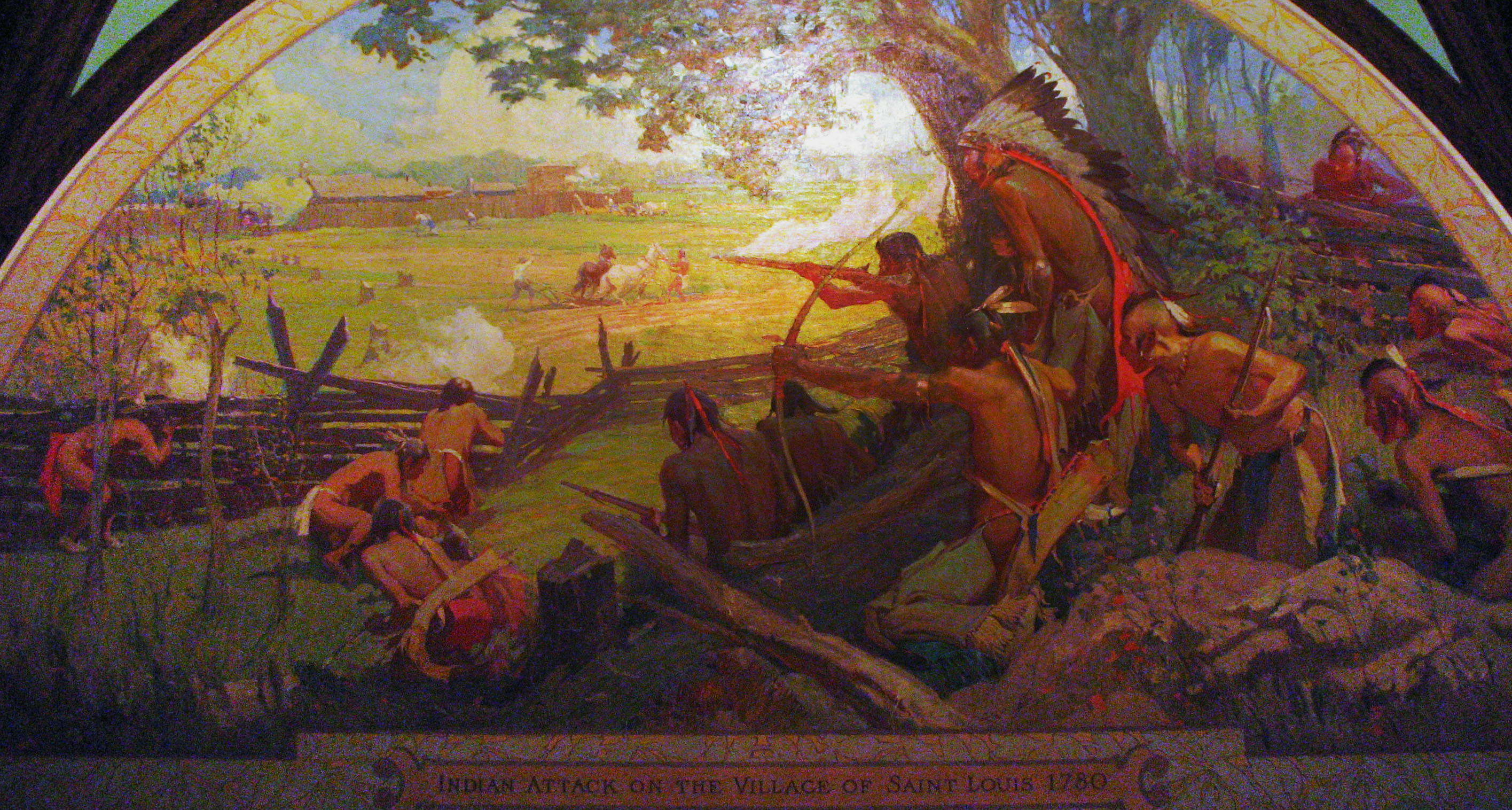
Battle of Saint Louis (1780)

Over the next several years of the war, both sides launched raids against each other, usually targeting settlements. In Spring of 1780, British and Native American forces swept across the Midwest and the South to clear the territories of rebels and Spanish forces, attacking St. Louis and Cahokia and Kentucky, but were repulsed in both battles. In St. Louis, the British and Indian force was repulsed by the mixed Spanish and French creole force. Fort San Carlos, a stone tower in modern downtown St Louis, was the center of this defense. Hundreds of Kentucky settlers were killed or captured in Bird's expedition, however, and within months, General George Rogers Clark retaliated by crossing the Ohio River and attacking Shawnee towns along the Mad River, Chillicothe and Piqua.

In the Illinois territory, French officer Augustin de La Balme assembled a militia force of French residents in an effort to take Fort Detroit. The force was destroyed in November by the Miami under Chief Little Turtle. At the same time, the nearly abandoned Fort St. Joseph was raided by Americans from Cahokia. On their return trip, however, they were overtaken by British loyalists and Indians near Petit fort.

== 1781 ==
Spanish Governor Francisco Cruzat, in St. Louis, sent a force of about 140 Spanish soldiers and American Indians under Captain Eugenio Pourré to capture Fort St. Joseph. It was captured and plundered on February 12, 1781.

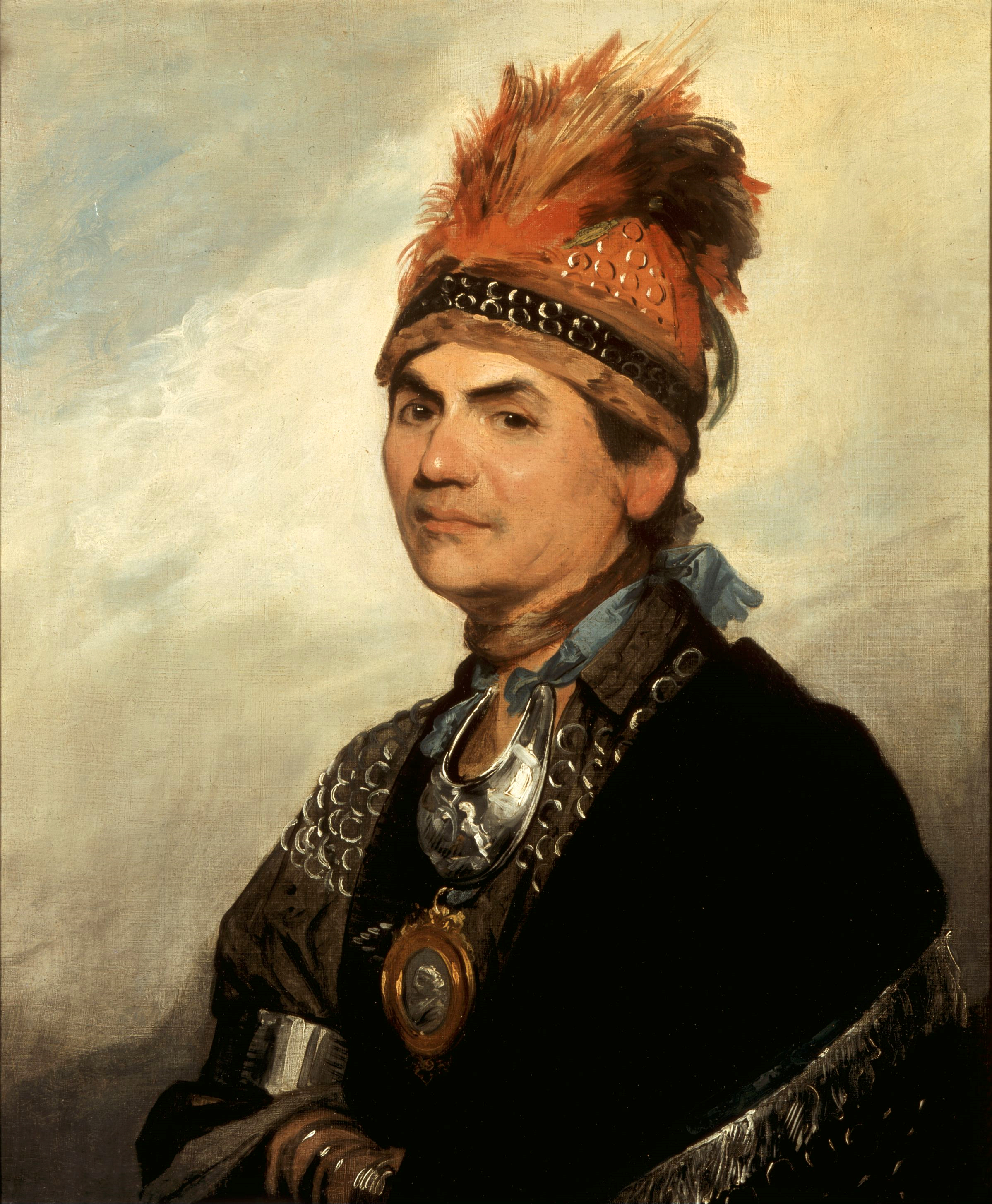
Joseph Brant (above), also known as Thayendanegea, led an attack on Col. Lochry (1781) that ended George Rogers Clark's plans to attack Detroit. Image by Gilbert Stuart 1786.

In late 1780, Clark traveled east to consult with Thomas Jefferson, the governor of Virginia, about an expedition in 1781. Jefferson devised a plan which called for Clark to lead 2,000 men against Detroit. Recruiting enough men was a problem, however. In time of war, most militiamen preferred to stay close to their homes rather than go on extended campaigns. Furthermore, Colonel Daniel Brodhead refused to detach the men because he was staging his own expedition against the Lenape, who had recently entered the war against the Americans. Brodhead marched into the Ohio Country and destroyed the Lenape Indian capital of Coshocton in April, but this only made the Lenape more determined enemies and deprived Clark of badly needed men and supplies for the Detroit campaign. Most of the Lenape fled to the militant towns on the Sandusky River.

When Clark finally left Fort Pitt in August, he was accompanied by only 400 men. On August 24, a detachment of one hundred of his men was ambushed near the Ohio River by Indians led by Joseph Brant (also Thayendanegea), a Mohawk leader temporarily in the west. Brant's victory ended Clark's efforts to move against Detroit. But that same year, British and Native American forces attacked Fort Laurens, a U.S. fort in the Ohio Territory.

Between the combatants on the Sandusky River and the Americans at Fort Pitt were several villages of pacifist Christian Lenape. The villages were administered by the Moravian missionaries David Zeisberger and John Heckewelder. Although non-combatants, the missionaries favored the American cause and kept American officials at Fort Pitt informed about hostile British and Indian activity. In response, in September 1781, Wyandots and Lenape from Sandusky forcibly removed the Christian Lenape and the missionaries to a new village (Captive Town) on the Sandusky River.

== 1782: "The Year of Blood" ==
In March 1782, 160 Pennsylvania militiamen under Lieutenant Colonel David Williamson rode into the Ohio Country, hoping to find the Indian warriors who were responsible for ongoing raids against Pennsylvania settlers. Enraged by the gruesome murder by Indians of a white woman and her baby, Williamson's men detained about 100 Lenape now known as the "Christian Munsee" at the village of Gnadenhütten. The Christian Munsee had returned to Gnadenhütten from Captive Town in order to harvest the crops that they had been forced to leave behind. Accusing the Christian Munsee of having aided Indian raiding parties, the Pennsylvanians killed the 100 Christian Indians—mostly women and children—with hammer blows to the head.

Colonel William Crawford of the Continental Army came out of retirement to lead 480 volunteer militiamen, mostly from Pennsylvania, deep into American Indian territory, with the intention of surprising the Indians. The Indians and their British allies from Detroit had learned about the expedition in advance, however, and brought about 440 men to the Sandusky to oppose the Americans. After a day of indecisive fighting, the Americans found themselves surrounded and attempted to retreat. The retreat turned into a rout, but most of the Americans managed to find their way back to Pennsylvania. About 70 Americans were killed; Indian and British losses were minimal.

During the retreat, Colonel Crawford and an unknown number of his men were captured. The Indians executed many of these captives in retaliation for the Gnadenhütten massacre earlier in the year, in which about 100 Indian civilians were murdered by Pennsylvania militiamen. Crawford's execution was particularly brutal: he was tortured for at least two hours before being burned at the stake.

The failure of the Crawford expedition caused alarm along the American frontier, as many Americans feared that the Indians would be emboldened by their victory and launch a new series of raids. Even more defeats for the Americans were yet to come, and so for Americans west of the Appalachian Mountains, 1782 became known as the "Bloody Year". On July 13, 1782, the Seneca leaders Sayenqueraghta and Guyasuta led about 100 Seneca and several British volunteers into Pennsylvania, destroying the Westmoreland County seat of Hanna's Town, and killing nine and capturing twelve settlers. It was the hardest blow dealt by Indians in Western Pennsylvania during the war.

In Kentucky, the Americans went on the defensive while Caldwell, Elliott, and McKee with their Indian allies prepared a major offensive. Fort Estill was attacked by Wyandot Indians in March 1782. Colonel Benjamin Logan, commanding officer of the region, and stationed at Logan's Station, learned that the Wyandot warriors were in the area on warpath. The Indians, aided by the British in Detroit, had raided from Boonsborough past Estill's Station along the Kentucky River. Logan dispatched 15 men to Captain Estill at Estill's Station with orders to increase his force by 25 more men and reconnoiter the country to the north and east. Following orders, Captain Estill reached the Kentucky River a few miles below the mouth of Station Camp Creek and camped that night at Sweet Lick, now known as Estill Springs. On the day after they left Estill's Station, a body of Indians appeared there at dawn on March 20, they raided the fort, scalped and killed a Miss Innes in sight of the fortification and took Monk, a slave of Captain Estill, and killed all the cattle. As soon as the Indians retreated, Samuel South and Peter Hackett, both young men, were dispatched to take the trail of the men and inform them of the news. The boys found them near the mouth of Drowning Creek and Red River early on the morning of March 21. Of the 40 men, approximately 20 had left families within the fort. They returned with the boys to Estill's Station. The remainder crossed the Kentucky river and found the Indian trail. Captain Estill organized a company of 25 men, followed the Indians, and suffered what is known as Estill's Defeat, later known as the Battle of Little Mountain (March 22, 1782) in Montgomery Co.

In July 1782, more than 1,000 Indians gathered at Wapatomica, but the expedition was called off after scouts reported that George Rogers Clark was preparing to invade the Ohio Country from Kentucky. The reports turned out to be false, but Caldwell still managed to lead 300 Indians into Kentucky and deliver a devastating blow at the Battle of Blue Licks in August. One of the last battles of the Revolutionary War was the September 1782 Siege of Fort Henry. With peace negotiations between the United States and Great Britain making progress, Caldwell was ordered to cease further operations. Similarly, General Irvine had gotten permission for a Continental Army expedition into the Ohio Country, but this was cancelled. In November, George Rogers Clark delivered the final blow in the Ohio Country, destroying several Shawnee towns, but inflicting little damage on the inhabitants.

== Peace and legacy ==
The war in the Northwest, in the words of historian David Curtis Scaggs, Jr., "ended in a stalemate". In the war's final years, each side could destroy enemy settlements, but could not stay and hold the territory. For the Shawnees, the war was a loss: the Americans had successfully defended Kentucky and increased settlement there, so that prime hunting ground was now lost. Although the Indians had been pushed back from the Ohio River and were now settled primarily in the Lake Erie basin, the Americans could not occupy the abandoned lands for fear of Indian raids.

News of the pending peace treaty arrived late in 1782. In the final treaty, Canada lost portions of its southwest territory as a result of the Ohio Country and areas south of the Great Lakes being signed away by Great Britain to the United States, even though "not a single American soldier was north of the Ohio River when the treaty was signed". Great Britain had not consulted the Indians in the peace process, and the Indians were nowhere mentioned in treaty's terms. The western theater had a markedly different tone from the European-style battles in the east, which left a generational impact on US settlers and Native Nations. For the Native Nations resisting the encroachment of their lands, the struggle would soon continue as the Northwest Indian War, though this time without the explicit support of the British.

== See also ==
- Western Department

== Sources ==
Published sources

- James, James Alton. George Rogers Clark papers. 2 vols.
- Kellogg, Louise P., ed. Frontier Advance on the Upper Ohio, 1778–1779. Madison: State Society of Wisconsin, 1916.
- Kellogg, Louise P., ed. Frontier Retreat on the Upper Ohio, 1779–1781. Originally published Madison, Wisconsin, 1917. Reprinted Baltimore: Clearfield, 2003. ISBN 0-8063-5191-8.
- Nogay, Michael Edward, " Every Home a Fort, Every Man a Warrior," (Tri-State Publishing Co.: 2009) ISBN 978-0-578-01862-1.
- Thwaites, Reuben G. and Louise P. Kellogg, eds. Frontier Defense on the Upper Ohio 1777–1778. Orig pub. 1912, Kraus reprint, Millwood, NY 1977.
- Thwaites, Reuben G. and Louise P. Kellogg, eds. The Revolution on the Upper Ohio, 1775–1777. Originally published 1908, Kennikat reprint, Port Washington, NY 1970.

=== Articles ===
- Belue, Ted Franklin. "Crawford's Sandusky Expedition". The American Revolution, 1775–1783: An Encyclopedia 1: 416–420. Ed. Richard L. Blanco. New York: Garland, 1993. ISBN 0-8240-5623-X.
- Calloway, Colin G. "Captain Pipe." American National Biography. 4: 368–69. Ed. John A. Garraty and Mark C. Carnes. New York: Oxford University Press, 1999. ISBN 0-19-512783-8.
- Clifton, James A. "Dunquat." American National Biography. 7: 105–07. Ed. John A. Garraty and Mark C. Carnes. New York: Oxford University Press, 1999. ISBN 0-19-512786-2.
- Quaife, Milo Milton. "The Ohio Campaigns of 1782". Mississippi Valley Historical Review 17, no. 4 (March 1931): 515–529.

=== Books ===
- Bakeless, John. Background to Glory: The Life of George Rogers Clark. Lincoln: University of Nebraska Press, 1957. Bison Book printing, 1992; ISBN 0-8032-6105-5. Popular history which portrays Clark as a military genius who conquered the Old Northwest. (The 1992 introduction by historian James P. Ronda reflects later doubts about this traditional view of Clark.)
- Calloway, Colin G. The American Revolution in Indian Country: Crisis and Diversity in Native American Communities. Cambridge University Press, 1995. ISBN 0-521-47149-4 (hardback).
- Dowd, Gregory Evans. A Spirited Resistance: The North American Indian Struggle for Unity, 1745–1815. Baltimore: Johns Hopkins University Press, 1992. ISBN 0-8018-4609-9.
- Downes, Randolph C. Council Fires on the Upper Ohio: A Narrative of Indian Affairs in the Upper Ohio Valley until 1795. Pittsburgh: University of Pittsburgh Press, 1940. ISBN 0-8229-5201-7 (1989 reprint).
- Grenier, John. The First Way of War: American War Making on the Frontier, 1607–1814. Cambridge University Press, 2005. ISBN 0-521-84566-1.
- Hogeland, William (2017). Autumn of the Black Snake. New York: Farrar, Straus and Giroux. ISBN 978-0-3741-0734-5.
- Hurt, R. Douglas. The Ohio Frontier: Crucible of the Old Northwest, 1720–1830. Bloomington, Indiana: Indiana University Press, 1996. ISBN 0-253-33210-9 (hardcover); ISBN 0-253-21212-X (1998 paperback).
- Kenton, Edna. Simon Kenton: His Life and Period, 1755–1836. Originally published 1930; reprinted Salem, NH: Ayer, 1993.
- Lancaster, Bruce (1971). The American Revolution. New York: American Heritage. ISBN 0-618-12739-9.
- Nelson, Larry L. A Man of Distinction among Them: Alexander McKee and the Ohio Country Frontier, 1754–1799. Kent, Ohio: Kent State University Press, 1999. ISBN 0-87338-620-5 (hardcover).
- Nester, William. The Frontier War for American Independence. Mechanicsburg, PA: Stackpole Books, 2004. ISBN 0-8117-0077-1.
- Scaggs, David Curtis, ed. The Old Northwest in the American Revolution: An Anthology. Madison: The State Historical Society of Wisconsin, 1977. ISBN 0-87020-164-6.
- Smith, Thomas H., ed. Ohio in the American Revolution: A Conference to Commemorate the 200th Anniversary of the Ft. Gower Resolves. Columbus: Ohio Historical Society, 1976.
- Sosin, Jack M. The Revolutionary Frontier, 1763–1783. New York: Holt, 1967.
- Van Every, Dale. A Company of Heroes: The American Frontier, 1775–1783. New York: Morrow, 1962. Popular history with emphasis on George Rogers Clark and Joseph Brant.
