= Brodhead's Coshocton expedition =

1781 military operation

- Part of the American Revolutionary War
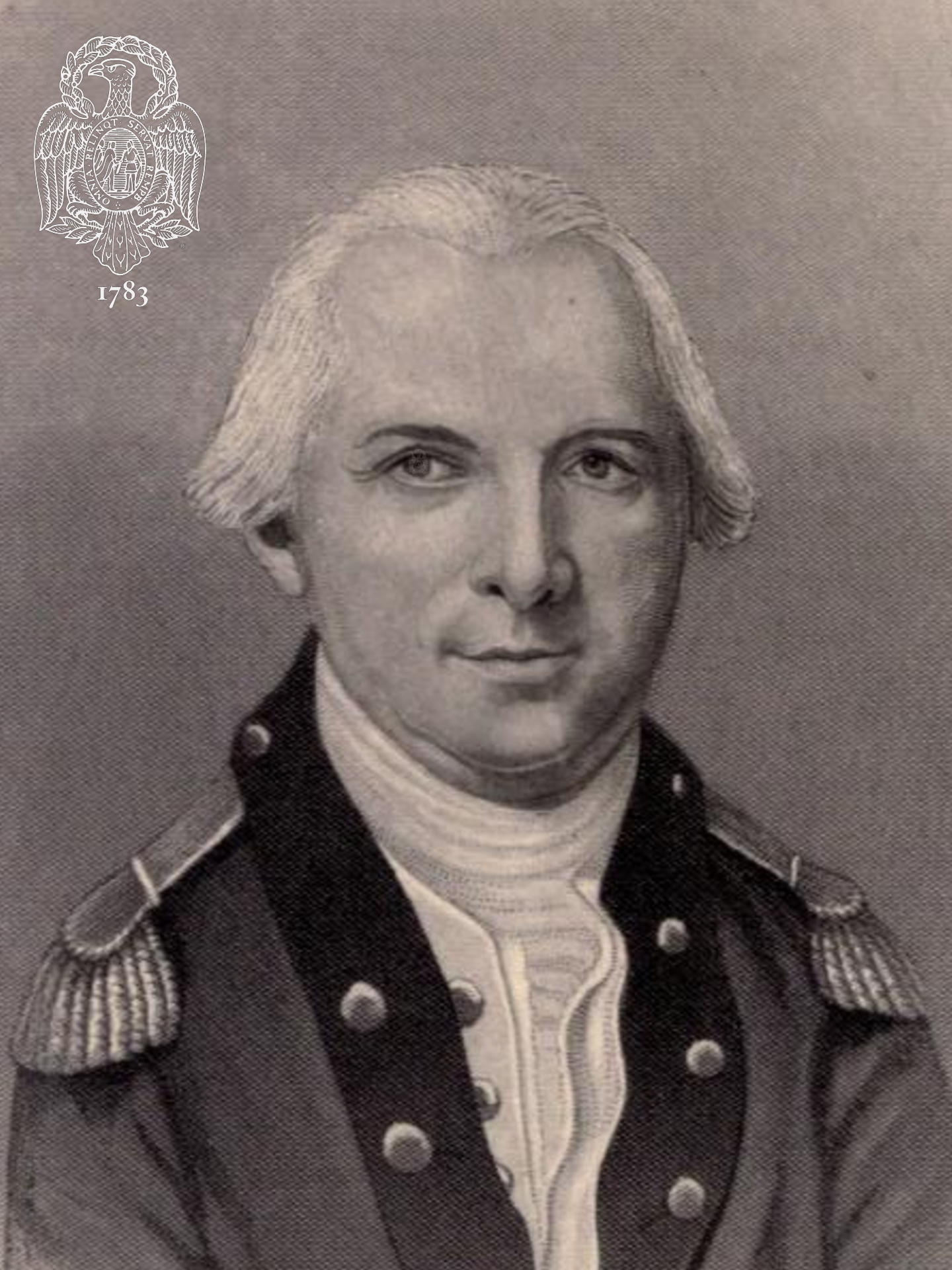
- 1880 portrait of Daniel Brodhead
Date	April 1781
Location	Ohio Country
Result	American victory

Belligerents
United States	Lenape

Commanders and leaders
Daniel Brodhead	Captain Pipe

Strength
150 regulars 134 militiamen	80

Casualties and losses
Unknown	20 killed 20 captured
- 16 Lenape prisoners killed

Brodhead's Coshocton expedition was a military expedition carried out by American forces against the Lenape in the Ohio Country in April 1781 during the American Revolutionary War. Led by Daniel Brodhead, the Americans raided and burnt the neutral Christian Munsee village of Indaochaic before attacking the Lenape village of Goschachgunk, massacring 16 prisoners before burning it as well.

== Background ==
On April 7, 1781, Daniel Brodhead led an American force of 150 Continental Army troops and 134 Pennsylvania militiamen out along the Ohio River. Fearing the neutral Turtle Clan of the Lenape in Goschachgunk would soon be joining the British as the more aggressive Wolf Clan had, they embarked with the initial purpose of securing the Turtle Clan's alliance. However, the ever-increasing attacks against American settlers made by the Wolf Clan caused many within Brodhead's ranks to seek retribution, and the mission became an active military campaign.

== Expedition ==
Brodhead first reached the main Turtle Clan village of Gekelmukpechunk. He requested a discussion between the principal chiefs of the village, and three were sent to meet him. His initial hope was to secure the allegiance of the villagers and enlist Lenape warriors into his campaign. Unfortunately, one of Brodhead's militiamen, Martin Wetzel, younger brother of Lewis Wetzel, killed one of the peaceful chiefs just as they had crossed the river to meet. Fearing massive losses and an unplanned battle, Brodhead retreated and refocused his troops on their initial goal of reaching Coshocton.

On April 20, Brodhead and his men, including some American-allied Lenape, raided and destroyed the neutral Christian Munsee village of Indaochaic. Then, aided by Lenape chief Gelelemend, they traveled to the nearby village of Goschachgunk. He divided his men into three regiments and laid their village to waste. On the first night, 16 Lenape warriors were captured, taken south of the village, and massacred by the Americans; another 20 were killed in battle, and 20 non-combatants were taken prisoner.

Five of those captured were Christian Munsees, who were released. Brodhead and Colonel David Shepherd did not further attack the Moravian Christian settlements, such as Schoenbrunn, Gnadenhutten and Salem, which housed Christian Indians and American missionaries such as John Heckewelder, as Brodhead declared that "these Indians had conducted themselves from the commencement of the war in a manner that did them honour." Brodhead and his soldiers received food from these villages. Feeling his expedition at the end and his troops' anger satiated, Brodhead returned to Pennsylvania.

== Aftermath ==
In 1782, American troops from Pennsylvania came back to the area. This was a force made up of primarily Pennsylvanian settlers attempting to avenge attacks on American settlers in Western Pennsylvania. After falsely promising protection to the Moravian Christian Lenape and Moravian Christian Mahicans, the Pennsylvania militia massacred residents of the pacifist Moravian Christian settlement of Gnadenhutten in what would become known as the Gnadenhutten massacre, with those who were murdered being recognized as Christian martyrs. This is also the settlement which housed many of the surviving people from the previously raided and destroyed the settlement of Lichtenau.

There is now a historical marker in the city of Coshocton at 40° 16.554' N, 81° 50.659' W.
