= Coshocton =

Coshocton may refer to:

- Coshocton, Ohio
  - Coshocton High School
- Coshocton County, Ohio
- Cohocton, New York
