= Gnadenhutten, Michigan =

Moravian Church settlement in Clinton, Michigan

Gnadenhuetten, alternatively known as New Gnadenhuetten to distinguish from other settlements with similar names, was a Moravian Church mission located in present-day Clinton Township, Macomb County, Michigan, then part of the British Province of Quebec. It was established in 1782 by Rev. David Zeisberger for Lenape who had relocated to the area from Ohio after the Gnadenhutten massacre there. It was closed in 1786 after being threatened by the Chippewa. Moravian Road now runs through the general area where the mission was.

== Sources ==
- Walter Romig, Michigan Place Names, p. 226-227.
- Jonathan Quint, "New Gnadenhutten, Moravian Missionaries, and Ojibwe Land Tenure on the Clinton River, 1781–1787," Ethnohistory 70, no. 1 (January 2023): 25–44.
