= Nonresistance =

Nonviolent philosophy

Nonresistance (or non-resistance) is "the practice or principle of not resisting authority, even when it is unjustly exercised". At its core is discouragement of, even opposition to, physical resistance to an enemy. It is considered as a form of principled nonviolence or pacifism which rejects all physical violence, whether exercised on individual, group, state or international levels. Practitioners of nonresistance may refuse to retaliate against an opponent or offer any form of self-defense. Nonresistance is often associated with particular religious groups, such as Anabaptist Christianity.

Sometimes nonresistance has been seen as compatible with, even part of, movements advocating social change. An often-cited example is the movement led by Mohandas Gandhi in the struggle for Indian Independence. While in particular instances (e.g., when threatened with arrest) practitioners in such movements might follow the line of nonresistance, such movements are more accurately described as cases of nonviolent resistance or civil resistance.

== History ==
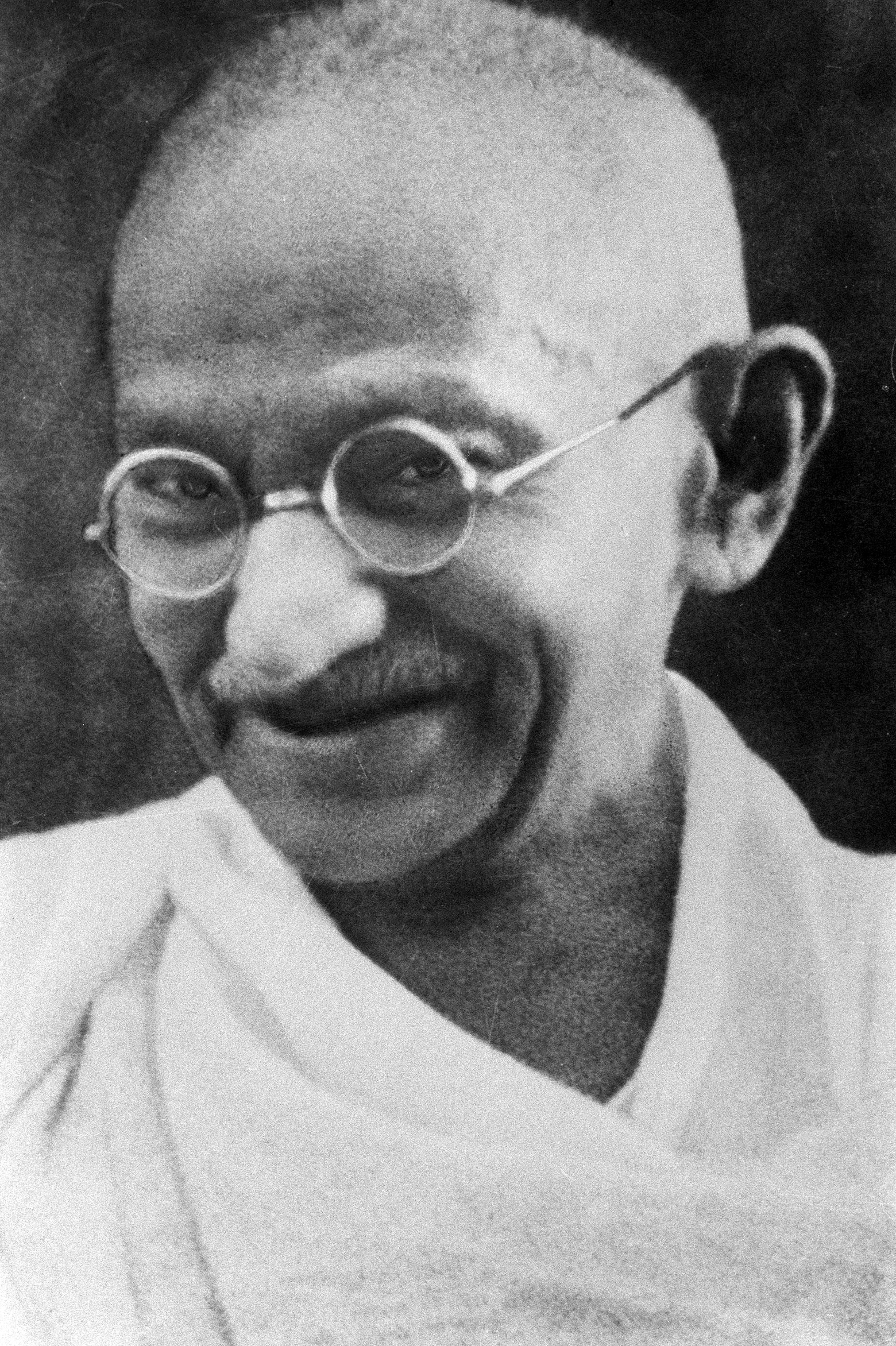
Mahatma Gandhi used the principle of nonresistance protest in Indian independence movement.

Anabaptist Christianity, which emerged in the Radical Reformation of the 16th century, became defined by its adherence to the doctrine of nonresistance, which they teach is found in the Bible in Matthew 5:39: "do not resist him who is evil."

The term nonresistance was later used to refer to the Established Church during the religious troubles in England following the English Civil War and Protestant Succession.

Nonresistance played a prominent role in the abolitionist movement in the 19th-century United States.

Leo Tolstoy, Adin Ballou, and Mahatma Gandhi were notable advocates of nonresistance. However, there were variations between them. Gandhi's Satyagraha movement was based on a belief in resistance that was active but at the same time nonviolent, and he did not believe in using nonresistance (or even nonviolent resistance) in circumstances where a failure to oppose an adversary effectively amounted to cowardice. "I do believe," he wrote, "that where there is only a choice between cowardice and violence, I would advise violence."

== Christian theology ==
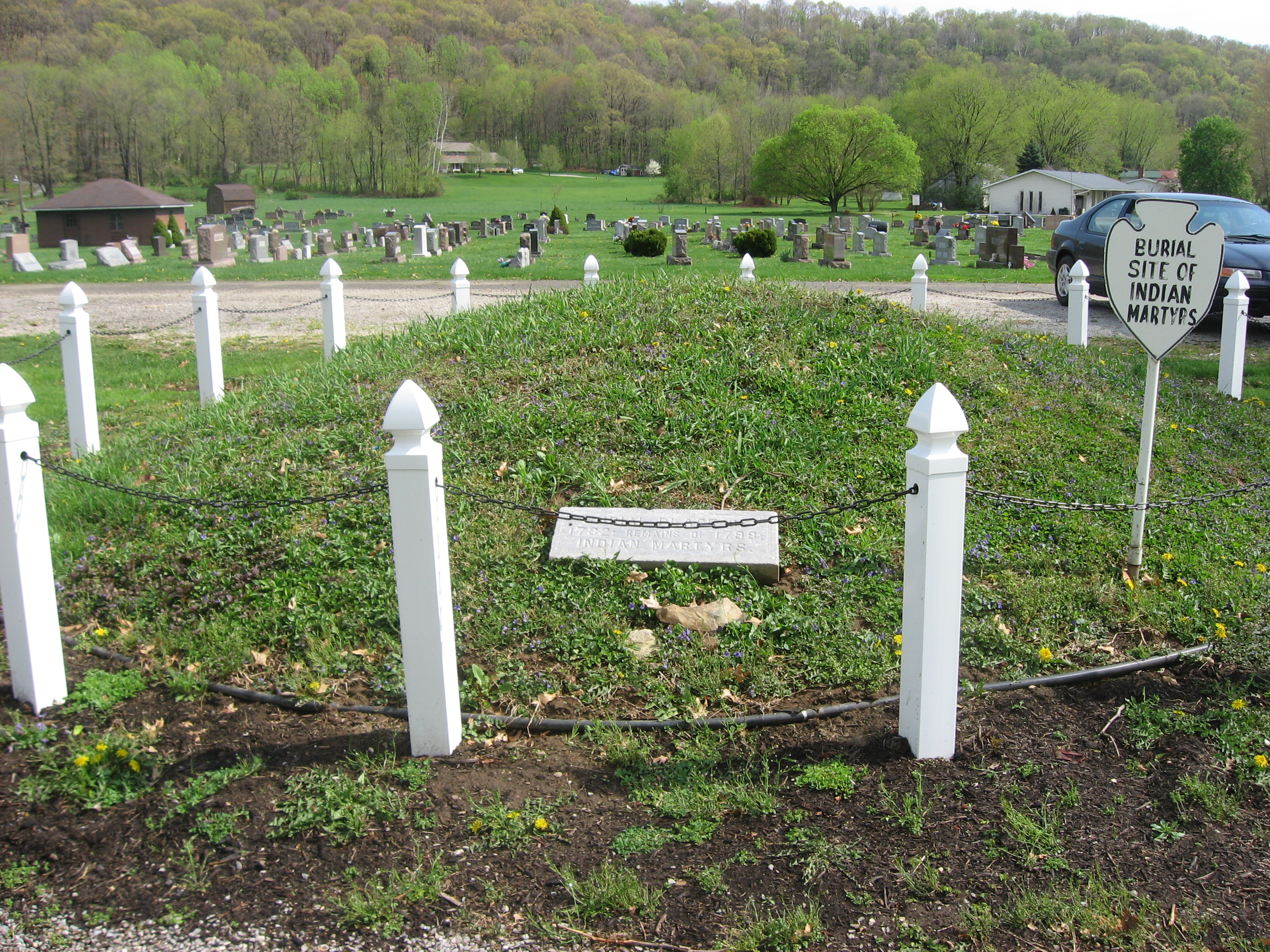
Burial site of the Moravian Christian Indian Martyrs, who were murdered by U.S. militiamen in the Gnadenhutten massacre

Christian nonresistance is based on a reading of the Sermon on the Mount, in which Jesus says:

You have heard that it was said, 'An eye for an eye and a tooth for a tooth.' But I say to you, Do not resist an evildoer. But if anyone strikes you on the right cheek, turn the other also; and if anyone wants to sue you and take your coat, give your cloak as well; and if anyone forces you to go one mile, go also the second mile. Give to everyone who begs from you, and do not refuse anyone who wants to borrow from you.

— Matthew 5:38–42, NRSV

Members of the Anabaptist Christian (Mennonite, Amish, Hutterite, Schwarzenau Brethren, River Brethren, Apostolic Christian and Charity Christian) denominations, Holiness Pacifists such as the Emmanuel Association of Churches and Church of God (Guthrie, Oklahoma), as well as other peace churches like the Quakers, in addition to the Moravian Church, have interpreted this passage to mean that people should do nothing to physically resist an enemy. According to this belief, only God has the right to execute punishments. Nonresistant Christians note that sacrificial love of Jesus resulted in his submission to crucifixion rather than vengeance. Anabaptist theology teaches:

The word "nonresistance" is taken from Matthew 5:39, "do not resist him who is evil." It is strictly a New Testament (NT) doctrine, intended for the followers of Jesus, with a specific purpose during this NT church age.

When we submitted ourselves to Jesus as Lord, we became citizens of the Kingdom of God, and accept the commands of the NT and the example of Christ as our rule for living. The NT forbids the Christian from retaliation and revenge but instead charges us to pray, bless, and do good to those who would harm us. We suffer the spoiling of our possessions for Christ's sake joyfully. We preach the Good News of the Gospel, which is a message of peace—reconciliation is possible between God and man. Jesus came not to resist and judge evil humanity, nor to set up an earthly government, but to willingly and peacefully lay down His life for His enemies. As followers of Christ, we are to follow His example so that our life becomes a living sermon, pointing to the life and works of Jesus. This is the purpose of nonresistance. Therefore, it is not a way of life to be foisted on those who are not the disciples of Jesus, because it is for the Church, a heavenly institution, established by God's redeeming grace. Nor do we expect it of the state, which is a worldly institution, functioning under God's conserving grace. The country is presently ordained by the sovereign God to carry the sword to keep order and execute the wrath of God, but nowhere in the NT are the Disciples of Jesus given a part in this service. We are called to walk as Jesus walked and to go into the nations, making disciples, teaching them his commands, and trusting in God for our protection.

The state and the Church are two separate institutions, differing in their purpose, character, and destiny.

The Moravian Church traditionally has taught the principle of nonresistance. In the Gnadenhutten massacre, members of the U.S. Militia murdered pacifist Moravian Christian Lenape at their settlement in Gnadenhutten (meaning "Houses of Grace" in the German language) and they became recognized as Christian martyrs:

One soldier taunted an Indian by pretending to offer him his hatchet with the words, "Strike me dead!" When the man answered, "I strike no one dead!" the soldier swung at the Indian and "chopped his arm away." All the while, the Indian kept singing [a Christian hymn] "until another blow split his head."

To illustrate how nonresistance works in practice, Alexandre Christoyannopoulos offers the following Christian anarchist response to terrorism:

The path shown by Jesus is a difficult one that can only be trod by true martyrs. A "martyr," etymologically, is he who makes himself a witness to his faith. And it is the ultimate testimony to one's faith to be ready to put it to practice even when one's very life is threatened. But the life to be sacrificed is not the enemy's life, but the martyr's own life – killing others is not a testimony of love, but of anger, fear, or hatred. For Tolstoy, therefore, a true martyr to Jesus' message would neither punish nor resist (or at least not use violence to resist), but would strive to act from love, however hard, whatever the likelihood of being crucified. He would patiently learn to forgive and turn the other cheek, even at the risk of death. Such would be the only way to eventually win the hearts and minds of the other camp and open up the possibilities for reconciliation in the "war on terror".

Author James R. Graham wrote, "The Christian is not a pacifist, he is a non-participationist."

A main application of this theology for nonresistant Christians is to practice conscientious objection with respect to military conscription. In addition to conscientious objection, nonresistant practices of Old Order Mennonites, Amish, and Conservative Mennonites include rejection of the following civil practices (cf. 1 Corinthians 6:1–8): sue at law, lobby the government, hold government office, use the force of the law to maintain their "rights" .

== See also ==
- Christian anarchism
- Christian pacifism
- Christian Peacemaker Teams
- Civil resistance
- Adin Ballou
- John Howard Yoder
- Nonviolence
- Nonviolent resistance
- Nonviolent revolution
- Passive obedience
- Peace churches
- Turn the other cheek
- Tolstoyan
- New England Non-Resistance Society
