= Frontier war =

Frontier War(s) or frontier war(s) may refer to:

- American Indian Wars (17th century to the early 20th century), also known as the American Frontier Wars
- Australian frontier wars (1788–1934)
- Xhosa Wars (1779–1879), also known as the Cape Frontier Wars

== See also ==
- Western theater of the American Revolutionary War
