= Gnadenhütten =

Gnadenhütten (German: [gnaːdǝnhʏtǝn]; lit. '"huts of grace"') the name of settlements founded by the German Moravian Church. The word was transliterated as Canatanheat by the missionary John Brainerd in his account.

The proper German spelling without the umlaut ü is Gnadenhuetten. American usage settled for Gnadenhutten, even though 19th century sources had used the umlaut.

Two settlements in the North American colonies were named Gnadenhütten. Each suffered massacres, called the Gnadenhütten massacre:

- Gnadenhütten massacre (Pennsylvania) in Gnadenhütten, Pennsylvania, in 1755 during the Seven Years' War (called the French and Indian War in the US)
- Gnadenhutten massacre in Gnadenhütten, Ohio, in 1782 during the American Revolutionary War

A third community, Gnadenhutten, Michigan, was settled by the Moravians in 1782 and abandoned in 1786.
