= Susanna Zeisberger =

- Born: February 17, 1744; Lancaster, Pennsylvania
- Died: November 8, 1824 (aged 80)
- Spouse: David Zeisberger

Susanna Lecron Zeisberger (1744–1824) was a deaconess and missionary of the Moravian Church.

== Biography ==
Susanna was born February 17, 1744, in Lancaster, Pennsylvania. She moved to Lititz, Pennsylvania, when she was sixteen years old and lived in the single sisters' house. She married the Moravian missionary David Zeisberger on May 4, 1781. Susanna was confirmed as a deaconess six days later on May 10, 1781, and became a missionary to the Native American lands in the Ohio Valley.

Susanna and her husband were missionaries in the years following the Gnadenhutten massacre of 1782. After the massacre, the Zeisbergers fled to Schönbrunn where they were captured by Indians on September 3, 1782. The Zeisbergers and successfully evangelized using respect for eastern tribal culture, such as that of the Lenape.

Susanna moved to the Bethlehem's widows' home following David's death in 1808. She died in 1824.
