= Coshocton City School District =

School district in Ohio

Coshocton City School District is a public school district serving the City of Coshocton, Ohio. The school district consists of approximately 1,600 students in grades K-12.

== Schools ==
High Schools
Coshocton High School and Coshocton Junior High share one building.

Elementary Schools

Coshocton Elementary School
