= Coshocton, Ohio =

City in Ohio, United States

- City
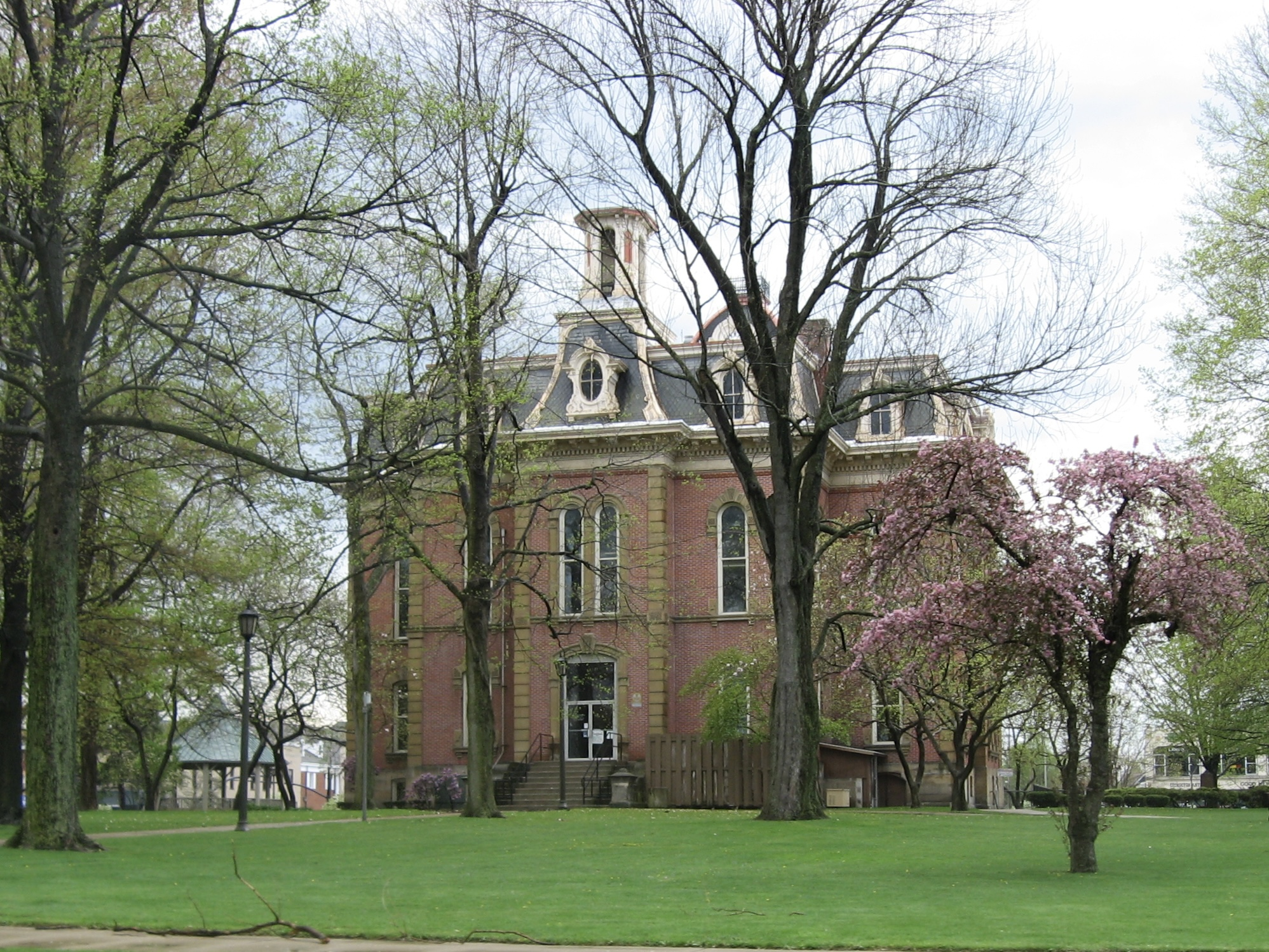
- Public square surrounding the Coshocton County Courthouse
- Interactive map of Coshocton, Ohio
- Location within Ohio Location within the United States
- Coordinates: 40°15′40″N 81°51′24″W
- Country: United States of America
- State: Ohio
- County: Coshocton
- Established: 1811

Government
  - Mayor: Mark Mills (D)

Area
  - Total: 8.17 sq mi (21.16 km^{2})
  - Land: 8.00 sq mi (20.73 km^{2})
  - Water: 0.17 sq mi (0.43 km^{2})
- Elevation: 814 ft (248 m)

Population (2020)
  - Total: 11,050
  - Estimate (2023): 11,091
  - Density: 1,380.6/sq mi (533.07/km^{2})
- ZIP code: 43812
- Area codes: 220 and 740
- FIPS code: 39-18868
- GNIS feature ID: 1085913
- Website: cityofcoshocton.com

Coshocton (/kəˈʃɒktən/ kə-SHOK-tən) is a city in Coshocton County, Ohio, United States, and its county seat. The population was 11,050 at the 2020 census. It is located approximately 63 miles (101 km) east-northeast of Columbus. The Walhonding River and the Tuscarawas River meet in Coshocton to form the Muskingum River.

Coshocton contains Roscoe Village, a restored canal-era community located next to the former Ohio and Erie Canal. The village is a heritage tourism attraction focused on the area's canal history. A heritage tourist attraction, it showcases the area's unique canal history. The city was developed on the site of a former Lenape village established in the late 1770s by bands who had migrated from the East under European oppression. Coshocton is the principal city of the Coshocton micropolitan area.

== History ==
The Lenape sympathetic to the new United States stayed near Coshocton, then called Gosch-ach-gunk. White Eyes, then leader of the Lenape people, signed the Treaty of Fort Pitt of 1778, by which the Lenape hoped to secure their safety during the War, and he promised scouts and support to the rebel colonists.

In retaliation for frontier raids by hostile Lenape and British, Colonel Daniel Brodhead of the Continental Army ignored the treaty. After indiscriminately raiding and destroying the peaceful Moravian Christian Lenape settlement of Indaochaic also known as Lichtenau, he attacked and destroyed the Lenape at Coshocton in April 1781.

Coshocton was originally called Tuscarawas by American colonists, after the river, and under the latter name was laid out in 1802. The young town was renamed Coshocton when it was designated county seat by the legislature in 1811.

== Geography ==
According to the United States Census Bureau, the city has a total area of 8.20 square miles (21.24 km^{2}), of which 8.08 square miles (20.93 km^{2}) is land and 0.12 square miles (0.31 km^{2}) is water.

=== Climate ===
Climate data for Coshocton, Ohio (1991–2020 normals, extremes 1915–present)
| Month | Jan | Feb | Mar | Apr | May | Jun | Jul | Aug | Sep | Oct | Nov | Dec | Year |
|---|---|---|---|---|---|---|---|---|---|---|---|---|---|
| Record high °F (°C) | 75 (24) | 76 (24) | 86 (30) | 93 (34) | 95 (35) | 103 (39) | 106 (41) | 106 (41) | 106 (41) | 92 (33) | 83 (28) | 77 (25) | 106 (41) |
| Mean daily maximum °F (°C) | 36.6 (2.6) | 40.3 (4.6) | 50.2 (10.1) | 63.1 (17.3) | 72.6 (22.6) | 80.0 (26.7) | 83.4 (28.6) | 82.2 (27.9) | 75.9 (24.4) | 64.5 (18.1) | 51.8 (11.0) | 41.0 (5.0) | 61.8 (16.6) |
| Daily mean °F (°C) | 28.3 (−2.1) | 31.1 (−0.5) | 39.8 (4.3) | 51.3 (10.7) | 61.1 (16.2) | 69.2 (20.7) | 72.9 (22.7) | 71.4 (21.9) | 64.6 (18.1) | 53.0 (11.7) | 41.8 (5.4) | 32.9 (0.5) | 51.4 (10.8) |
| Mean daily minimum °F (°C) | 19.9 (−6.7) | 22.0 (−5.6) | 29.5 (−1.4) | 39.4 (4.1) | 49.7 (9.8) | 58.3 (14.6) | 62.6 (17.0) | 60.7 (15.9) | 53.2 (11.8) | 41.6 (5.3) | 31.8 (−0.1) | 24.9 (−3.9) | 41.1 (5.1) |
| Record low °F (°C) | −24 (−31) | −26 (−32) | −6 (−21) | 9 (−13) | 20 (−7) | 31 (−1) | 41 (5) | 39 (4) | 27 (−3) | 16 (−9) | −5 (−21) | −20 (−29) | −26 (−32) |
| Average precipitation inches (mm) | 3.15 (80) | 2.55 (65) | 3.71 (94) | 4.15 (105) | 4.32 (110) | 4.71 (120) | 4.23 (107) | 4.20 (107) | 3.17 (81) | 3.10 (79) | 3.10 (79) | 3.17 (81) | 43.56 (1,106) |
| Average snowfall inches (cm) | 5.6 (14) | 3.1 (7.9) | 2.9 (7.4) | 0.2 (0.51) | 0.0 (0.0) | 0.0 (0.0) | 0.0 (0.0) | 0.0 (0.0) | 0.0 (0.0) | 0.0 (0.0) | 0.5 (1.3) | 3.0 (7.6) | 15.3 (39) |
| Average precipitation days (≥ 0.01 in) | 13.6 | 11.3 | 12.2 | 13.6 | 13.2 | 11.8 | 11.4 | 10.4 | 8.7 | 10.5 | 10.9 | 11.8 | 139.4 |
| Average snowy days (≥ 0.1 in) | 5.3 | 3.7 | 1.8 | 0.3 | 0.0 | 0.0 | 0.0 | 0.0 | 0.0 | 0.0 | 0.6 | 3.4 | 15.1 |
Source: NOAA

== Demographics ==
Historical population
| Census | Pop. | Note | %± |
|---|---|---|---|
| 1830 | 333 | | — |
| 1840 | 625 | | 87.7% |
| 1850 | 850 | | 36.0% |
| 1860 | 1,151 | | 35.4% |
| 1870 | 1,754 | | 52.4% |
| 1880 | 3,044 | | 73.5% |
| 1890 | 3,672 | | 20.6% |
| 1900 | 6,473 | | 76.3% |
| 1910 | 9,603 | | 48.4% |
| 1920 | 10,847 | | 13.0% |
| 1930 | 10,908 | | 0.6% |
| 1940 | 11,569 | | 6.1% |
| 1950 | 11,675 | | 0.9% |
| 1960 | 13,106 | | 12.3% |
| 1970 | 13,747 | | 4.9% |
| 1980 | 13,418 | | −2.4% |
| 1990 | 12,193 | | −9.1% |
| 2000 | 11,682 | | −4.2% |
| 2010 | 11,216 | | −4.0% |
| 2020 | 11,050 | | −1.5% |
| 2023 (est.) | 11,091 | | 0.4% |
U.S. Decennial Census

=== 2020 census ===
As of the 2020 census, Coshocton had a population of 11,050. The median age was 42.7 years. 22.5% of residents were under the age of 18 and 22.3% of residents were 65 years of age or older. For every 100 females there were 90.1 males, and for every 100 females age 18 and over there were 86.5 males age 18 and over.

98.8% of residents lived in urban areas, while 1.2% lived in rural areas.

There were 4,755 households in Coshocton, of which 27.0% had children under the age of 18 living in them. Of all households, 40.0% were married-couple households, 18.0% were households with a male householder and no spouse or partner present, and 33.0% were households with a female householder and no spouse or partner present. About 34.9% of all households were made up of individuals and 17.4% had someone living alone who was 65 years of age or older.

There were 5,317 housing units, of which 10.6% were vacant. The homeowner vacancy rate was 2.7% and the rental vacancy rate was 7.9%.

Racial composition as of the 2020 census
| Race | Number | Percent |
|---|---|---|
| White | 10,190 | 92.2% |
| Black or African American | 246 | 2.2% |
| American Indian and Alaska Native | 19 | 0.2% |
| Asian | 65 | 0.6% |
| Native Hawaiian and Other Pacific Islander | 2 | 0.0% |
| Some other race | 42 | 0.4% |
| Two or more races | 486 | 4.4% |
| Hispanic or Latino (of any race) | 162 | 1.5% |

=== 2010 census ===
As of the census of 2010, there were 11,216 people, 4,872 households, and 2,927 families residing in the city. The population density was 1,388.1 inhabitants per square mile (535.9/km^{2}). There were 5,458 housing units at an average density of 675.5 per square mile (260.8/km^{2}). The racial makeup of the city was 95.7% White, 1.8% African American, 0.2% Native American, 0.4% Asian, 0.3% from other races, and 1.6% from two or more races. Hispanic or Latino of any race were 1.1% of the population.

There were 4,872 households, of which 27.1% had children under the age of 18 living with them, 42.5% were married couples living together, 13.1% had a female householder with no husband present, 4.5% had a male householder with no wife present, and 39.9% were non-families. 34.9% of all households were made up of individuals, and 17.9% had someone living alone who was 65 years of age or older. The average household size was 2.25 and the average family size was 2.85.

The median age in the city was 42.9 years. 21.7% of residents were under the age of 18; 7.7% were between the ages of 18 and 24; 23.2% were from 25 to 44; 27% were from 45 to 64; and 20.5% were 65 years of age or older. The gender makeup of the city was 46.8% male and 53.2% female.

=== 2000 census ===
As of the census of 2000, there were 11,682 people, 5,048 households, and 3,160 families residing in the city. The population density was 1,562.1 inhabitants per square mile (603.1/km^{2}). There were 5,471 housing units at an average density of 731.6 per square mile (282.5/km^{2}). The racial makeup of the city was 96.05% White, 1.63% African American, 0.16% Native American, 0.79% Asian, 0.02% Pacific Islander, 0.33% from other races, and 1.03% from two or more races. Hispanic or Latino of any race were 0.59% of the population.

There were 5,048 households, out of which 28.0% had children under the age of 18 living with them, 48.5% were married couples living together, 10.8% had a female householder with no husband present, and 37.4% were non-families. 33.5% of all households were made up of individuals, and 17.7% had someone living alone who was 65 years of age or older. The average household size was 2.27 and the average family size was 2.87.

In the city the population was spread out, with 23.2% under the age of 18, 7.6% from 18 to 24, 25.5% from 25 to 44, 23.6% from 45 to 64, and 20.1% who were 65 years of age or older. The median age was 41 years. For every 100 females, there were 86.1 males. For every 100 females age 18 and over, there were 82.2 males.

The median income for a household in the city was $31,098, and the median income for a family was $42,088. Males had a median income of $31,163 versus $22,130 for females. The per capita income for the city was $17,436. About 6.8% of families and 8.3% of the population were below the poverty line, including 7.3% of those under age 18 and 6.4% of those age 65 or over.

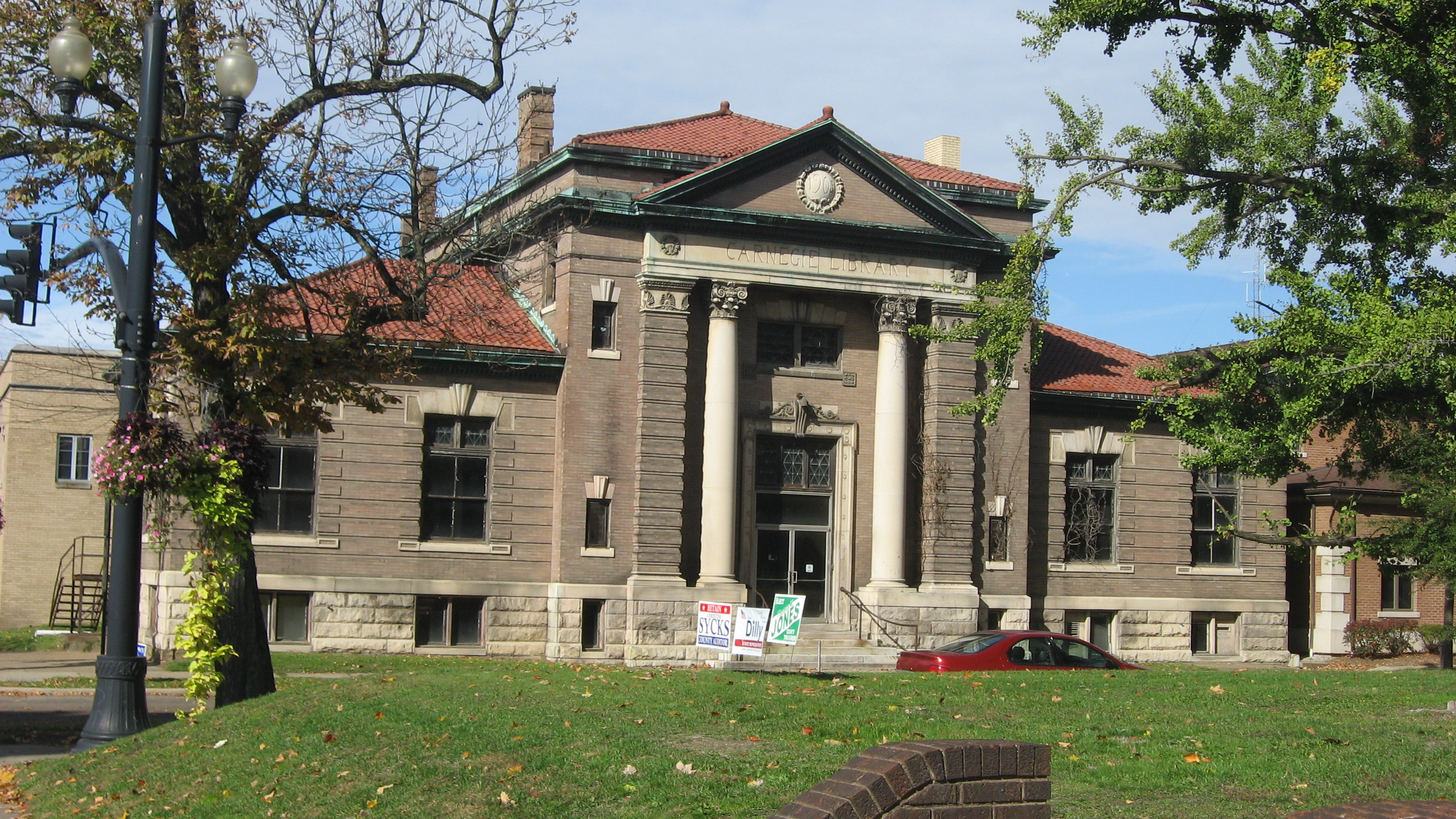
Coshocton Carnegie Library

== Education ==
The Coshocton City School District includes Coshocton Elementary School, Coshocton Middle School, and Coshocton High School.

Coshocton is home to a campus of the Central Ohio Technical College, which offers 31 associate degree programs and 12 certificate programs.

The main branch of the Coshocton Public Library system is located on Main Street in downtown Coshocton.

== Infrastructure ==
=== Transportation ===
The Richard Downing Airport is located three nautical miles (3.5 mi; 5.6 km) north of Coshocton's central business district.

== Notable people ==
- Lydia Loveless (born 1990), alternative country music star
- Mike McCullough (born March 21, 1945), professional golfer
