= Coshocton High School =

Public school in Coshocton, Ohio, United States

Location
- 1205 Cambridge Road; Coshocton, Ohio 43812; United States
- Coordinates: 40°15′28″N 81°50′42″W

Information
- Type: Public, coeducational
- School district: Coshocton City School District
- Principal: Scott Loomis
- Teaching staff: 39.00 (FTE)
- Grades: 7-12
- Student to teacher ratio: 16.38
- Colors: Red and black
- Athletics conference: East Central Ohio League
- Team name: Redskins
- Rival: River View High School
- Yearbook: "The Tomahawk"
- Website: coshoctonredskins.com

Coshocton High School is a public high school in Coshocton, Ohio. The school primarily serves students residing in the Coshocton City School District. The school district also participates in open enrollment making it possible for students from outside district boundaries to enroll at Coshocton High School. The school currently has an enrollment of approximately 700 students in grades 7–12.

== Sports ==
Coshocton High School is a member of the East Central Ohio League. Sports competed in include; swimming, football, soccer, baseball, basketball, softball, volleyball, golf, track, wrestling, and tennis.

=== State championships ===
- Boys golf – 1970, 1975, 1982
- Baseball – 1978

== See also ==
- Native American mascot controversy
- Sports teams named Redskins
