= Gnadenhutten, Ohio =

- Village
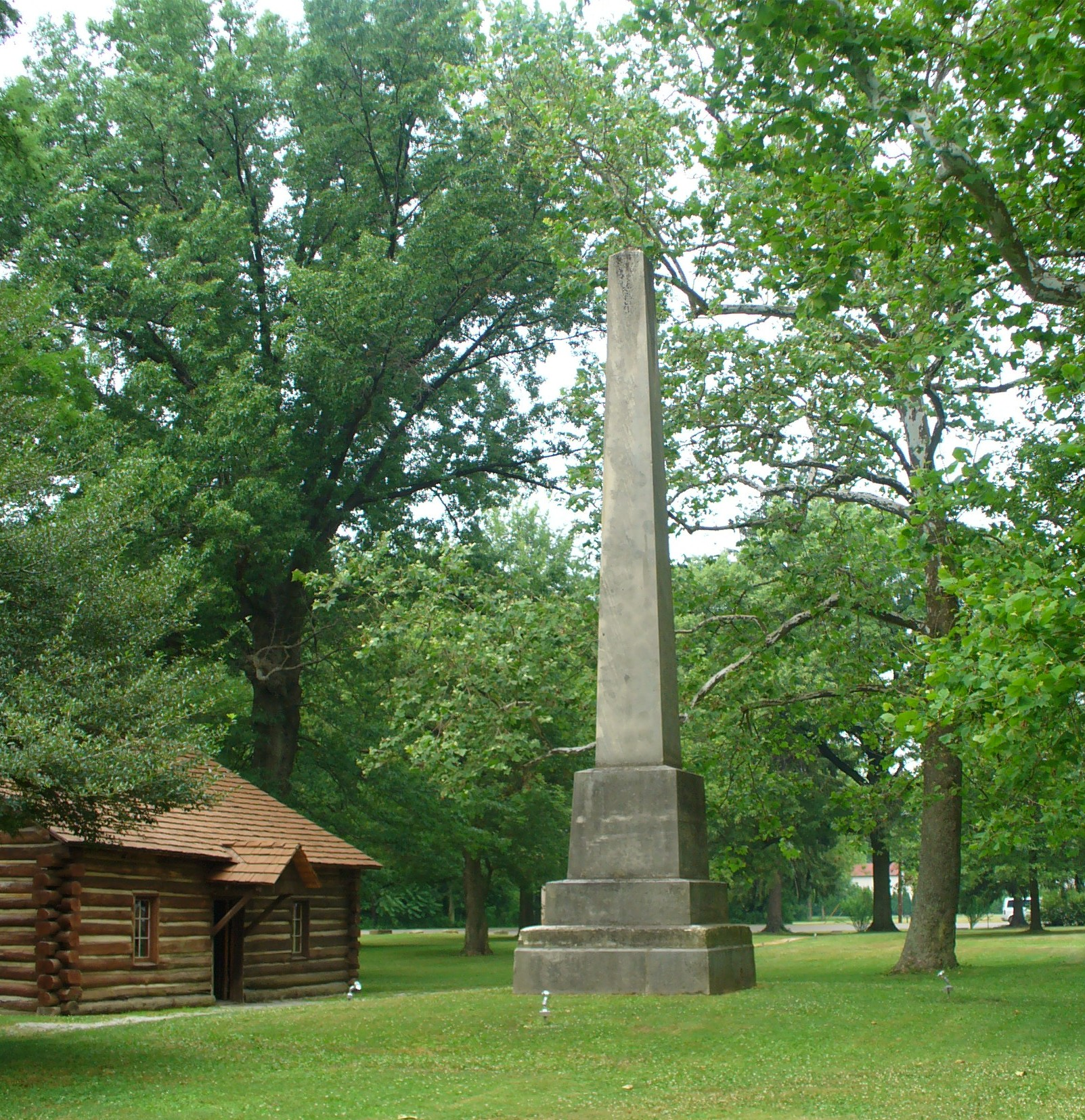
- Monument at the massacre site

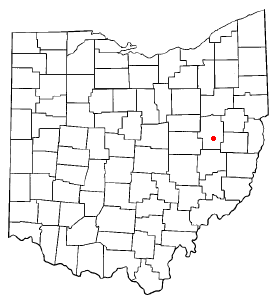
- Location of Gnadenhutten, Ohio

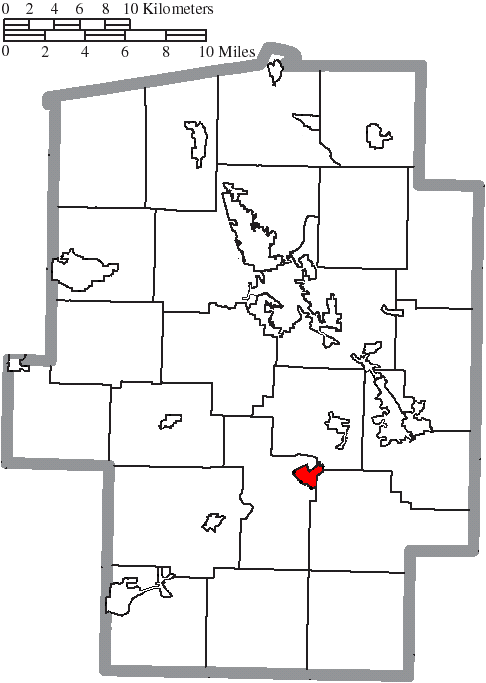
- Location of Gnadenhutten in Tuscarawas County
- Coordinates: 40°21′36″N 81°25′46″W
- Country: United States
- State: Ohio
- County: Tuscarawas
- Townships: Clay, Warwick, & Rush

Government
  - Mayor: Dean Steer

Area
  - Total: 0.92 sq mi (2.37 km^{2})
  - Land: 0.92 sq mi (2.37 km^{2})
  - Water: 0 sq mi (0.00 km^{2})
- Elevation: 846 ft (258 m)

Population (2020)
  - Total: 1,240
  - Estimate (2023): 1,209
  - Density: 1,354.1/sq mi (522.82/km^{2})
- Time zone: UTC-5 (Eastern (EST))
  - Summer (DST): UTC-4 (EDT)
- ZIP code: 44629
- Area codes: 740, 330
- FIPS code: 39-30702
- GNIS feature ID: 2398983
- Website: https://villageofgnadenhutten.org/

Gnadenhutten (/dʒəˈneɪdənhʌtən/ jə-NAY-dən-hut-ən, meaning "Huts of Grace" in German) is a village located on the Tuscarawas River in Tuscarawas County, Ohio, United States. The population was 1,240 at the 2020 census. It is Ohio's oldest existing European founded settlement, being founded by Moravian Christians in 1772 and was the site of the Gnadenhutten massacre during the American Revolutionary War. It is part of the New Philadelphia–Dover micropolitan area.

== Etymology ==
Gnadenhutten is derived from the German name Gnadenhütten (German: [ˈgnaːdn̩hʏtn̩]), meaning literally "huts of grace" or "mercy huts" and figuratively "log tabernacle". Gnadenhutten was declared the "most difficult to pronounce" place name in the state of Ohio by Reader's Digest.

== History ==
Gnadenhutten, originally Gnadenhütten, was founded in October 1772 as the second settlement of German Americans and Lenape Indians affiliated with the Moravian Church. Tribes of Christian Lenni Lenape people had settled at Schoenbrunn nearby, founded months earlier by missionary David Zeisberger. On July 4, 1773, a baby boy was born to the Roth family, becoming the first white child known to be born in the Ohio territory. This community, originally led by the Christian Mohican chieftain Joshua (who died August 1 of the following year), had grown to about 200 persons by 1775.

As pacifists, they remained neutral during the American Revolution and subsequent Revolutionary War. However, the British and their Indian Wyandot and Delaware allies suspected that members of the Christian Gnadenhutten, Schoenbrunn, and Salem communities had provided aid to American patriots. As a result, the British forced the Lenape tribespeople in the region to the Upper Sandusky area of the Ohio territory. While the British detained Rev. Zeisberger at Fort Detroit, they allowed roughly 150 Lenape to return to their old town to gather the harvest and supplies stored there. However, Pennsylvania militiamen, led by David Williamson, following the murder of American settlers by other Indian tribes a few weeks earlier, came to the resettled town in March 1782, and tricked the Indians into giving up their weapons. Ninety-six innocent Lenape men, women, and children spent the night in song and prayer knowing they would be slaughtered the following morning.

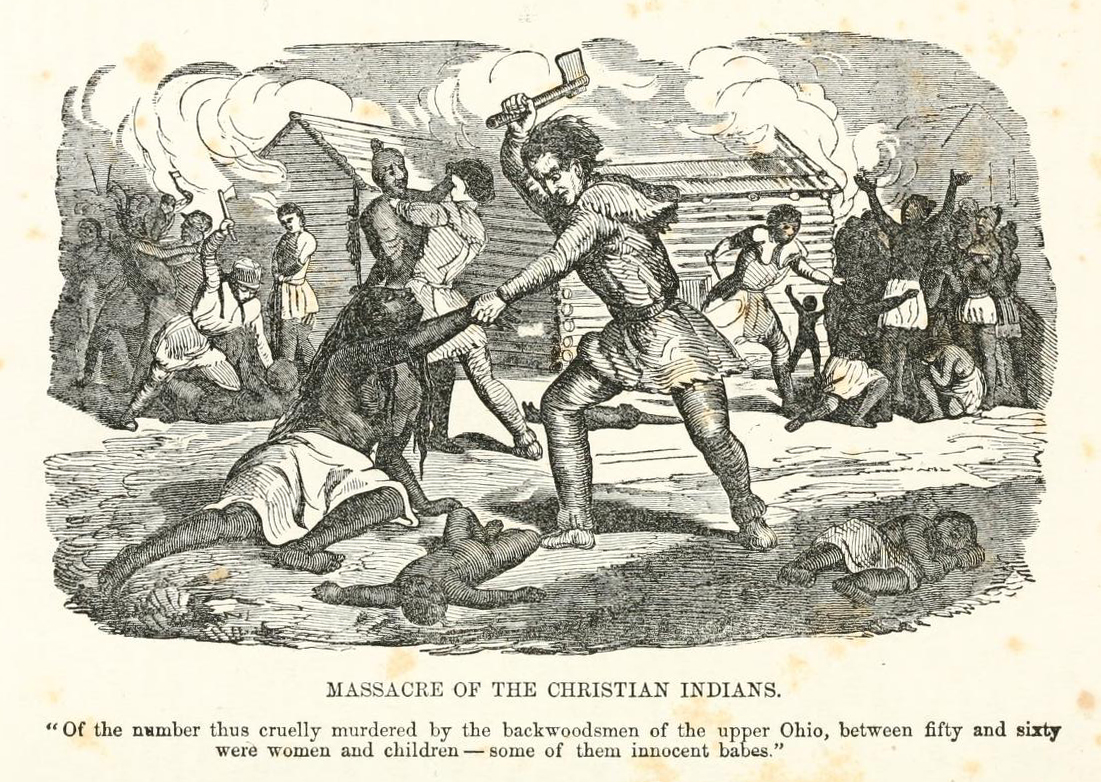
Illustration of the Gnadenhutten Massacre

On March 8, 1782, the Pennsylvanians committed the Gnadenhutten massacre and burned the approximately 60 cabins in the town. Only two boys escaped; the incident led to distrust between Native Americans and American settlers, and reprisals against American patriots in Native American custody.

Although three 4,000 acre tracts were reserved for Indians as an "act of indemnity", John Ettwein petitioned Congress in 1783 and the area was then opened to European American settlers. John Heckewelder from Pennsylvania built the first house in 1798, and Moravians remain in the town today. Few Native Americans chose to live there and they gave up title in 1823 after the Moravians had made many improvements.

Gnadenhutten was on a major wagon road crossing the Tuscarawas River. The first Ohio Canal was dug nearby in 1825–1830, providing access to markets as well as further immigrants via Cleveland. A railroad linked to the area in 1853, further improving market access and allowing industrial development. A flood in 1913 destroyed the canal, which was not rebuilt as other means of transportation had superseded it.

Gnadenhutten erected a monument to the martyrs of the March 8, 1782, massacre during the centennial of its founding, and in 1963 established a museum interpreting it and other aspects of the town's history (including the results of 1970 excavations, and having rebuilt the Mission House and Cooper shop, and erected a mound containing the martyrs' graves). Various Native American and First Nations people gathered at the site in 1988 to dedicate a peace tree. The State of Ohio erected a memorial marker in 2003, calling the event a "day of shame"; it had erected another historical marker shortly before the town's entrance in 1979.

The Moravians rebuilt their church in 1903 and dedicated it as a memorial to John Heckewelder. The village also has a Masonic Temple (built 1855 and rebuilt), Methodist church (built circa 1910), as well as a Church of Christ and Full Gospel Pentecostal Church on the outskirts. Its current library was erected in 1942.

== Geography ==
According to the United States Census Bureau, the village has a total area of 0.97 square miles (2.51 km^{2}), all land.

== Demographics ==
Historical population
Census	Pop.	Note	%±
1870	284		—
1880	336		18.3%
1890	478		42.3%
1900	547		14.4%
1910	560		2.4%
1920	530		−5.4%
1930	870		64.2%
1940	876		0.7%
1950	895		2.2%
1960	1,257		40.4%
1970	1,466		16.6%
1980	1,320		−10.0%
1990	1,226		−7.1%
2000	1,280		4.4%
2010	1,288		0.6%
2020	1,240		−3.7%
2023 (est.)	1,209	▼	−2.5%
U.S. Decennial Census

=== 2010 census ===
As of the census of 2010, there were 1,288 people, 509 households, and 359 families living in the village. The population density was 1,327.8 inhabitants per square mile (512.7/km^{2}). There were 553 housing units at an average density of 570.1 per square mile (220.1/km^{2}). The racial makeup of the village was 99.1% white, 0.2% from other races, and 0.7% from two or more races. Hispanic or Latino of any race were 0.5% of the population.

There were 509 households, of which 35.0% had children under the age of 18 living with them, 60.3% were married couples living together, 6.7% had a female householder with no husband present, 3.5% had a male householder with no wife present, and 29.5% were non-families. 25.7% of all households were made up of individuals, and 14.2% had someone living alone who was 65 years of age or older. The average household size was 2.52 and the average family size was 3.05.

The median age in the village was 39.3 years. 25.6% of residents were under the age of 18; 6.7% were between the ages of 18 and 24; 26.2% were from 25 to 44; 24.3% were from 45 to 64; and 17.4% were 65 years of age or older. The gender makeup of the village was 49.5% male and 50.5% female.

=== 2000 census ===
As of the census of 2000, there were 1,280 people, 513 households, and 377 families living in the village. The population density was 1,281.7 inhabitants per square mile (494.9/km^{2}). There were 539 housing units at an average density of 539.7 per square mile (208.4/km^{2}). The racial makeup of the village was 99.45% white, 0.08% African American, and 0.47% from two or more races. Hispanic or Latino of any race were 0.16% of the population.

There were 513 households, out of which 30.4% had children under the age of 18 living with them, 62.8% were married couples living together, 7.6% had a female householder with no husband present, and 26.5% were non-families. 24.2% of all households were made up of individuals, and 14.6% had someone living alone who was 65 years of age or older. The average household size was 2.49 and the average family size was 2.94.

In the village, the population was spread out, with 23.8% under the age of 18, 8.9% from 18 to 24, 26.5% from 25 to 44, 21.5% from 45 to 64, and 19.4% who were 65 years of age or older. The median age was 39 years. For every 100 females there were 86.9 males. For every 100 females age 18 and over, there were 83.8 males.

The median income for a household in the village was $34,286, and the median income for a family was $38,000. Males had a median income of $32,026 versus $20,526 for females. The per capita income for the village was $15,961. About 9.3% of families and 8.8% of the population were below the poverty line, including 12.0% of those under age 18 and 4.1% of those age 65 or over.

== Culture ==
Gnadenhutten is known for its Fourth of July celebration, featuring horse-drawn carriages and fireworks. It also celebrates its Pioneer Days on the first weekend in August and an Apple Butter festival the second weekend of October. Its Native American heritage continues to be marked with its "Indian Valley" moniker and a Christian Indian Christmas Drive-Thru Display Thanksgiving through December.

== Education ==
Children in Gnadenhutten are served by the public Indian Valley Local School District. The current schools serving the village are:

- Port Washington Elementary School – grades K-5
- Midvale Elementary School – grades K-5
- Indian Valley Middle School – grades 6-8
- Indian Valley High School – grades 9-12

== Notable people ==
- Bob Huggins, former men's college basketball coach
- Eldon Miller, former men's college basketball coach
