= John Heckewelder =

United States Moravian missionary

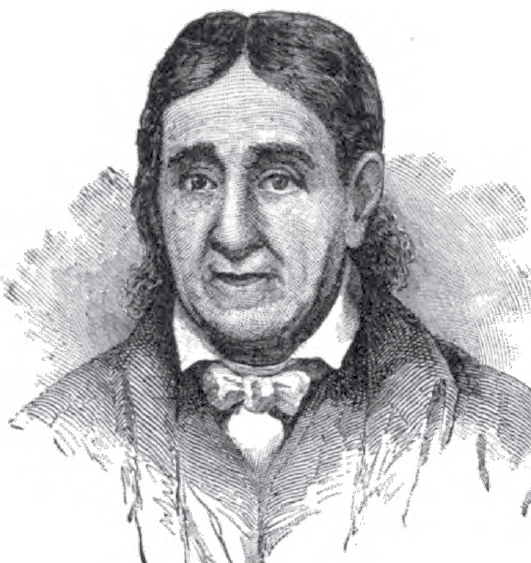
- Heckewelder as depicted in an 1807 sketch by Henry Howe

John Gottlieb Ernestus Heckewelder (March 12, 1743 – January 21, 1823) was an American missionary for the Moravian Church.

== Early life ==
Heckewelder was born in Bedford, England and came to Pennsylvania in 1754. After finishing his education, he was an apprentice to a cooper. Following a visit to Ohio with Christian F. Post, a colonial agent, in 1762 he began temporary employment in the Moravian missions at Friedenshütten and Sheshequin, Pennsylvania.

== Career ==
In 1771, he began his career as an evangelist to the Indians, being appointed assistant to David Zeisberger, in Ohio, where he remained for fifteen years. In 1792, at the request of the Secretary of War, he accompanied Gen. Rufus Putnam to Post Vincennes to treat with the Indians. In 1793 he was again commissioned to assist at a treaty with the Indians of the lakes.

In his book, Heckewelder explained the beliefs of the Delaware Lenape, that the creator "made the Earth and all that it contains for the common good of mankind; when he stocked the country that he gave them with plenty of game, it was not for the benefit of a few, but of all; everything was given in common to the sons of men. Whatever liveth on the land, whatsoever groweth out of the Earth, and all that is in the rivers and waters was given jointly to all and everyone is entitled to his share. From this principle hospitality flows as from its source."

Between 1797 and 1800, he lived predominantly in Ohio, where he was in the civil service as a postmaster, justice of the peace, and an associate justice of the court of common pleas. He settled at Gnadenhutten, Ohio, in 1801, and devoted himself to the duties of his agency. In 1810, he resigned and engaged in literary pursuits in Bethlehem, Pennsylvania until his death.

In 1822, Heckewelder was elected a member of the American Antiquarian Society.

== Literary work ==
Heckewelder studied the languages, manners, and customs of American Indians, particularly the Delawares. As a member of the American Philosophical Society in Philadelphia, several of his contributions were published by the society. Heckewelder also published Account of the History, Manners, and Customs of the Indian Nations who once inhabited Pennsylvania and the Neighboring States (Philadelphia, 1818; German translation, Göttingen, 1821; French translation, Paris, 1822); Narrative of the Mission of the United Brethren among the Delawares and Mohegan Indians (Philadelphia, 1820); and a collection of Names which the Lenni Lenape or Delaware Indians gave to Rivers, Streams, and Localities within the States of Pennsylvania. New Jersey, Maryland, and Virginia, with their Signification (1822).

Many of his manuscripts are currently housed in the collections of the Historical Society of Pennsylvania in Philadelphia.

== Legacy ==
- The John Heckewelder Memorial Moravian Church in Gnadenhutten, Ohio was named in his honor.
