= Lichtenau, Ohio =

Abandoned village in Coshocton County, Ohio

Coordinates: 40.2462°N 81.8705°W

Lichtenau is an abandoned village in Coshocton County, Ohio.

== History ==
Lichtenau (German meaning "pasture of light") was founded as an Indian Christian settlement in the late 18th century by German-speaking missionaries of the Moravian Church.

The town was abandoned by the converts in 1780.
