= Gnadenhutten massacre =

1782 killing of Christian Lenape by American soldiers during the Revolutionary War

- Part of the American Revolutionary War
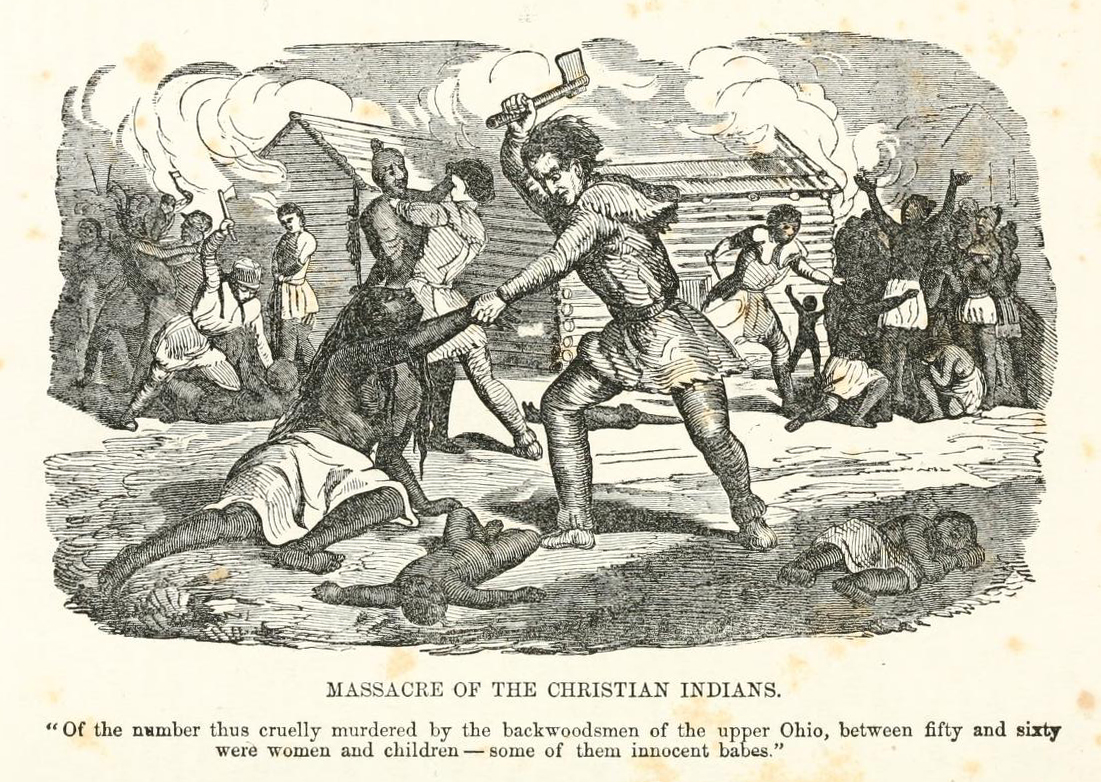
- 1852 woodcut of the massacre
- Location: Gnadenhutten, Ohio Country
- Date: March 8, 1782
- Attack type: Mass killing
- Deaths: 96 killed
- Perpetrator: Pennsylvania Militia

Moravian Christian Indian Martyrs
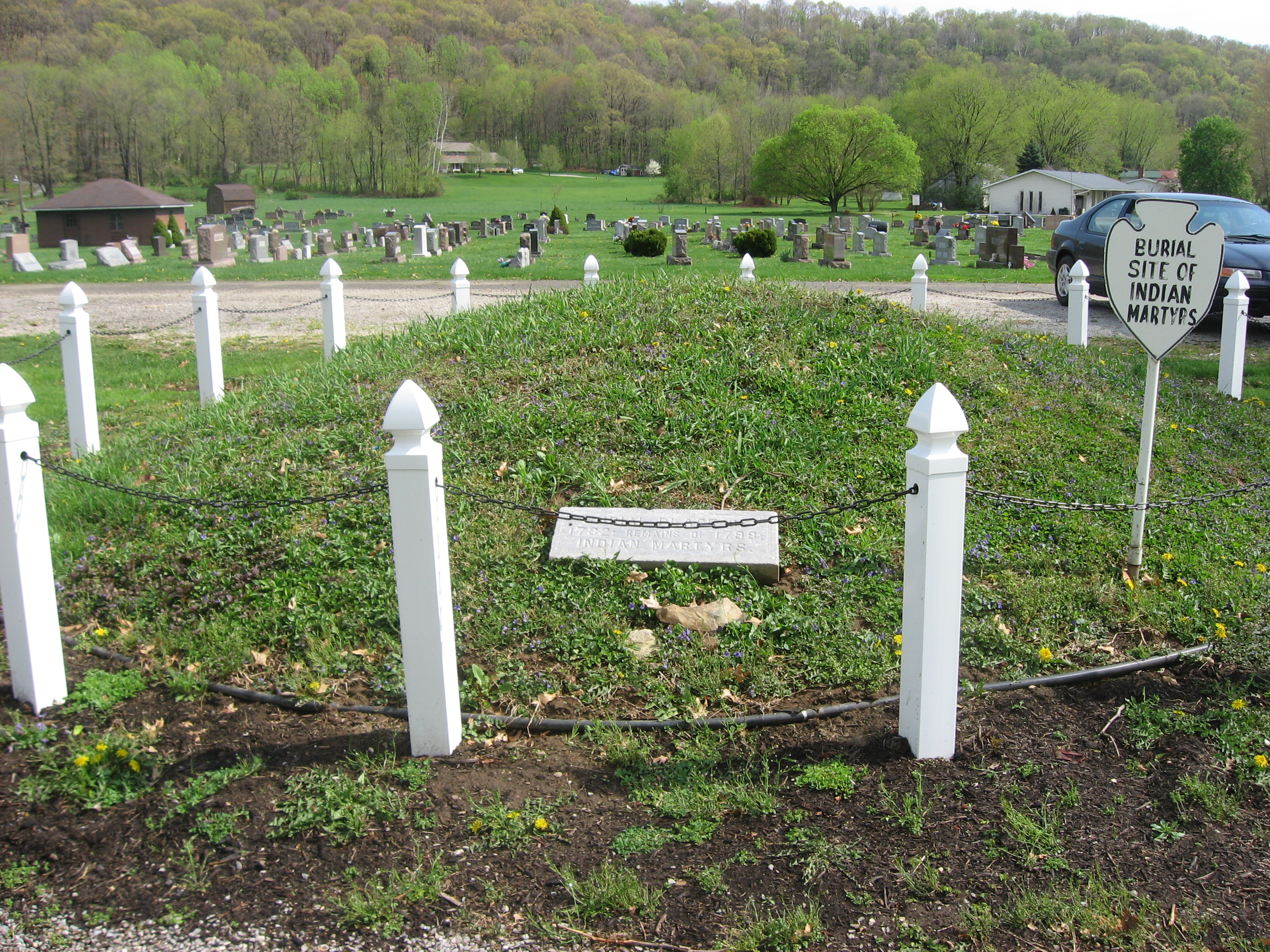
- Burial site of the Moravian Martyrs
- Died: March 8, 1782, Gnadenhutten, Ohio
- Martyred by: Pennsylvania militia
- Venerated in: Moravian Church
- Major shrine: Gnadenhutten, Ohio
- Feast: March 8

The Gnadenhutten massacre, also known as the Moravian massacre, was the killing of 96 pacifist Moravian Christian Indians (primarily Lenape and Mohican) by U.S. militiamen from Pennsylvania, under the command of David Williamson, on March 8, 1782, at the Moravian missionary village of Gnadenhutten, Ohio Country, during the American Revolutionary War.

Due to their commitment to Christian pacifism, the Moravians did not take sides during the American Revolutionary War, which caused them to be viewed with suspicion by both the British and the Americans. As the Moravians were collecting crops, Pennsylvania militia encountered them and falsely promised the Moravians that they would be "relocated away from the warring parties." Once they were gathered together, however, the American militia rounded up the unarmed Moravians and said that they planned to execute them for being spies, charges that the Moravians rebutted.

The Moravians asked their captors to be allowed to pray and worship on the night before their execution; they spent the night before their deaths praying as well as singing Christian hymns and psalms. Eighteen of the U.S. militiamen were opposed to the killing of the pacifist Moravians, although they were outvoted by those who wanted to murder them; those who opposed the murder did not participate in the massacre and separated themselves from the killers. Before murdering them, the American soldiers "dragged the women and girls out into the snow and systematically raped them." As they were being killed, the Moravians "sang hymns and spoke words of encouragement and consolation to one another until they were slain". Believing in nonresistance, they pleaded for their lives to be spared, but did not fight back against their persecutors.

Moravian missionary David Zeisberger declared the slain Lenape and Mohican as Christian martyrs, who are remembered in the Moravian Church. More than a century later, Theodore Roosevelt called the massacre "a stain on frontier character that the lapse of time cannot wash away."

The shrine to the Moravian Christian Indian Martyrs includes a monument that was erected and dedicated ninety years after the Gnadenhutten massacre by a Chief of the Christian Munsee tribe; the graves of the victims contain "bones [which] were gathered by the faithful missionaries some time after the massacre". It also includes a large Christian cross dedicated to the Moravian Munsee and Christian Mahican Martyrs by a member of the tribe and descendant of one of the slain. With the site of the village being preserved, a reconstructed mission house and cooper's house were built there. The burial mound is marked and has been maintained on the site; the village site has been listed on the National Register of Historic Places.

== Background ==
- Gnadenhutten Massacre Site
- U.S. National Register of Historic Places
- Location within Ohio Location within the United States
- Nearest city: Gnadenhutten, Ohio
- Coordinates: 40°21′15″N 81°26′6″W
- Built: 1782
- NRHP reference No.: 70000519
- Added to NRHP: November 10, 1970

During the American Revolutionary War, bands of the Lenape (also Delaware) in the Ohio Country, both Munsee- and Unami-speaking, were deeply divided over which side, if any, to take in the conflict. The Munsee were generally northern bands originating from around the Hudson River and upper Delaware River. The Unami were from the southern reaches of the Delaware.

Years earlier, many Lenape had migrated west to Ohio from their territory on the mid-Atlantic coast to try to escape colonial encroachment, as well as pressure from Haudenosaunee Confederacy tribes based around the Great Lakes and western New York to the north. They resettled in what is now Ohio, with bands in several villages around their main village of Coshocton. These villages were named Schoenbrunn, Gnadenhutten, and Salem, and were located on what was then called the Muskingum River. Modern geography places Coshocton on the Muskingum River and the three smaller villages on the Tuscarawas River.

By the time of the Revolutionary War, the Lenape villages lay between the opposing sides, which both had western frontier strongholds: The American Continental Army had an outpost at Fort Pitt (now Pittsburgh, Pennsylvania), while the British with their Native American allies were based around Fort Detroit, Michigan.

Some Lenape decided to take up arms against the Americans and moved to the northwest, closer to Fort Detroit, where they settled on the Scioto and Sandusky rivers. Those Lenape sympathetic to the Americans remained at Coshocton, and their leaders, including White Eyes, signed the Treaty of Fort Pitt with the Americans in 1778. Through this treaty, White Eyes intended to secure the Ohio Country as a state to be inhabited exclusively by Native Americans, as part of the new United States.

A third group of Lenape, many of them Munsee and Unami converts to Christianity, lived in several mission villages in Ohio led by David Zeisberger and other missionaries of the Moravian Church. From the mid-Atlantic area, they spoke the Munsee and the Unami dialects of Delaware, an Algonquian language. These Christian Lenape, being Moravians, held to Christian pacifism.

White Eyes, a Lenape chief and Speaker of the Lenape Head Council, negotiated the treaty. When he died in 1778, reportedly of smallpox, the treaty had not yet been ratified by the Continental Congress. United States officials never pursued it, and the proposed Native American state was dropped. Years later George Morgan, a colonial diplomat to the Lenape and Shawnee during the American Revolution, wrote to Congress that White Eyes had been murdered by American militia in Michigan.

Many Lenape at Coshocton eventually joined the war against the Americans, in part because of American raids against friendly Lenape bands. In response, Colonel Daniel Brodhead led an expedition out of Fort Pitt and destroyed Coshocton on April 19, 1781. Surviving residents fled to the north. Colonel Brodhead convinced the militia to leave the Lenape at the Moravian mission villages unmolested since they were peaceful and neutral.

Brodhead having to restrain the militia from attacking the Moravian villages was a reflection of the brutal nature of frontier warfare. Violence had escalated on both sides. Relations between regular Continental Army officers from the east (such as Brodhead) and western militia were frequently strained. The tensions were worsened by the American government's policy of recruiting some Native American tribes as allies in the war. Western militiamen, many of whom had lost friends and family in Native American raids against settlers' encroachment, blamed all indigenous people for the acts of some and did not distinguish between friendly and hostile tribes or bands.

== Removal and massacre ==
In September 1781 British-allied Native Americans, primarily Wyandot and Lenape, forced the Christian Native Americans and missionaries from the Moravian villages. They took them northwest toward Lake Erie to a new village called Captive Town on the Sandusky River. The British took the Moravian Christian missionaries David Zeisberger and John Heckewelder under guard back to Fort Detroit, where they tried the two men on charges of treason: the British had suspected them of providing military intelligence to the American garrison at Fort Pitt. The missionaries were acquitted during the trial.

The Moravian Christian Indians at Captive Town were going hungry because of insufficient rations. In February 1782, more than 150 were allowed to return to their old Moravian villages (such as Gnadenhutten, Salem and Shoenbrunn) to harvest the crops and collect stored food they had been forced to leave behind. The frontier war was still raging. On March 4, 1782, the Pennsylvania raiding party of 160 Pennsylvania militiamen led by Lieutenant Colonel David Williamson marched toward the Tuscarawas Valley and on the morning of March 6, they first saw Joseph Schebosh Jr., a Moravian Christian who was the son of a Welsh man and Christian Munsee Indian woman; he was brutally murdered by the Pennsylvania militia despite the fact that he plead for his life before them. After pressing on to the corn fields, the Pennsylvania militiamen feigned goodwill with the Moravian Christian Indians to gain their trust. The Moravian Christian Lenape fed the American militiamen, who falsely promised them that they would take them to Fort Pitt, where they would be protected. The Indians were requested by the American soldiers to hand over their guns (which they used for hunting) and hatchets. Some militiamen went to the Moravian settlement of Salem, where they similarly feigned goodwill toward the Christian Indians and persuaded them to come to Gnadenhutten.

When they arrived, the American soldiers bound all of the Indians and accused them of taking part in raids into Pennsylvania. Even though the Moravians Christians, who held to the doctrine of Christian pacifism, denied these false charges, the militia held a council and voted to kill them anyway (with the exception of the minority of eighteen militiamen). After the Indians were told of the American militia's vote, they requested time to prepare for death and spent the night praying to God and singing hymns. They were held in two buildings: one for men and one for women and children. While the Indians were worshipping, the Pennsylvania militiamen spent the night getting intoxicated on the communion wine they stole from the believers.

The next morning on March 8, the militia brought the Christian Indians to one of two "killing houses", one for men and the other for women and children. The American militia tied the Indians, stunned them with mallet blows to the head, and killed them with fatal scalping cuts. Refusing to take part, some of the militiamen "wrung their hands—and calling God to witness that they were innocent of the blood of these harmless Christian Indians, they withdrew to some distance from the scene of the slaughter." One of those who opposed the killing of the Moravian Indians was Obadiah Holmes, Jr. He wrote:

One Nathan Rollins & brother [who] had had a father & uncle killed took the lead in murdering the Indians, ...& Nathan Rollins had tomahawked nineteen of the poor Moravians, & after it was over he sat down & cried, & said it was no satisfaction for the loss of his father & uncle after all.

While waiting to be executed, the Indians sang hymns and prayed, with many praying for their murderers. One example of their nonresistance was described in these terms:

One soldier taunted an Indian by pretending to offer him his hatchet with the words, "Strike me dead!" When the man answered, "I strike no one dead!" the soldier swung at the Indian and "chopped his arm away." All the while, the Indian kept singing [a hymn] "until another blow split his head."

An account of the Moravian Martyrs recalled:

One after another, men, women, and children, were led out to a block prepared for the dreadful purpose; and, being commanded to sit down, the axe of the butcher, in the hands of the infuriate demons, clave their skulls. Two persons, who were present at that time, and who related to me the fearful story, assured me that they were unable to witness, but for a short time, the horrid scene. One of these men stated, that when he saw the incarnate fiends lead a pretty little girl, about twelve years of age, to the fatal block, and heard her plead for her life, in the most piteous accents, till her innocent voice was hushed in death, he felt a faintness come over him, and could no longer stand the heart-sickening scene. The dreadful work of human slaughter continued till every prayer, and moan, and sigh was hushed in the stillness of death. No sex, age, or condition was spared, from the grey-haired sire to the infant at its mother's breast. All fell victims to the most cold-blooded murder ever perpetrated by man. There lay, in undistinguished confusion, gashed and gory, in that cellar, where they were thrown by their butchers, nearly one hundred murdered Christian Indians, hurried to an untimely grave by those who had but two days before sworn to protect them.

While the massacre was under way, a messenger sent by the Moravian missionaries in Sandusky on March 3 reached Schoenbrunn on March 6, with the news that the missionaries would be moving to Detroit. Two of the Moravian Indians from Schoenbrunn went to inform their brethren in Gnadenhutten but on their journey, saw the mangled body of Joseph Schebosh Jr. They buried his body and quickly returned to warn their brethren in Schoenbrunn as they thought that the others at Gnadenhutten had met the same fate. As a result, Moravian Christian Indians at Schoenbrunn were able to flee to Sandusky, escaping the militiamen who had planned to travel to Schoenbrunn and commit another massacre.

In all, the militia murdered and scalped 28 men, 29 women, and 39 children. Two Indian boys, one of whom had been scalped, survived to tell of the massacre. The militia piled the bodies in the mission buildings and burned the village down. They also burned the other abandoned Moravian villages.

The militiamen had looted the villages prior to their burning. The plunder, which needed 80 horses to carry, included everything the people had held: furs for trade, pewter, tea sets, and clothing. A few years later, Moravian Christian missionary John Heckewelder collected the remains of the Christian Munsee and Christian Mahican Martyrs and buried them in a mound on the southern side of the village.

== Aftermath ==
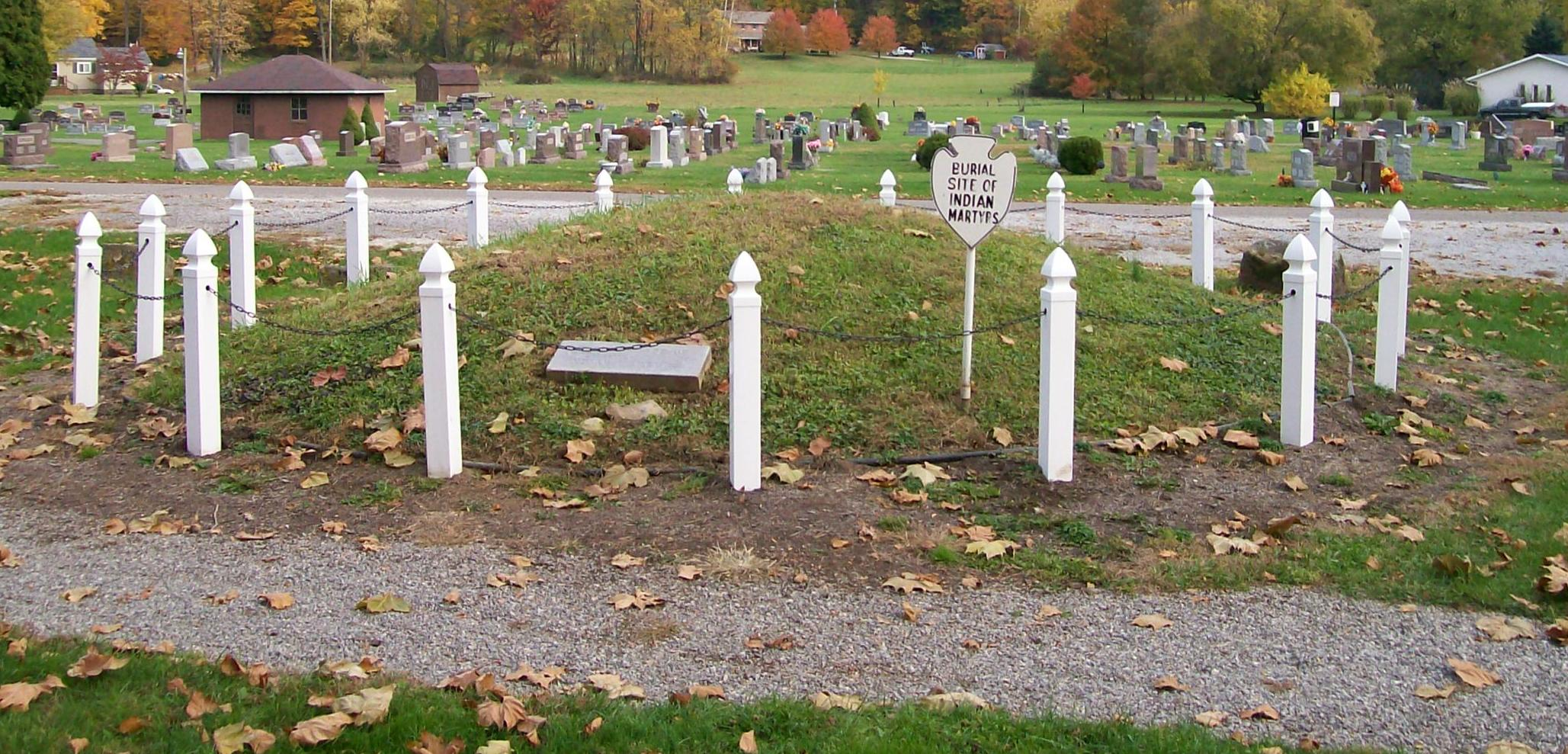
The burial mound at the Gnadenhutten Massacre Site

Obadiah Holmes, Jr., a militiaman who had not participated in the Gnadenhutten massacre, rescued one of the Lenape children, whom he raised himself.

The surviving Moravian Christians from Schoenbrunn, Gnadenhutten, and Salem etc. moved from Sandusky towards the Thames River (present-day London, Ontario). Outraged by the massacre, the U. S. Congress granted them three town sites in 1785. In 1798, David Zeisberger led many of the Moravian Christian Indians back to Ohio, where they established the Goshen Mission near Schoenbrunn; there, Zeisberger lived until he peacefully died after which many of the Indians moved back to Ontario (cf. Delaware Nation at Moraviantown) and others to Kansas, along with missionaries who continued to live and work among them. The descendants of both Jacob and Ester, the children of Israel Welapachtshechen (who was martyred during Gnadenhutten massacre), make up the majority of the Christian Munsee tribe in Kansas today.

Reliable accounts regarding the Gnadenhutten massacre come from the Moravian missionaries, as well as the two Moravian Indian boys who escaped—Jacob and Thomas, as well as those who survived such as the Moravian Indians at Schoenbrunn. Many of the soldiers who participated in the slaughter denied their involvement, and neither did their descendants acknowledge their actions. At the time of the massacre, although many settlers were outraged by it, frontier residents generally supported the militia's actions. Despite talk of bringing the murderers to justice, no criminal charges were filed and the conflict continued unabated. However, as "the details of the Gnadenhutten massacre [published by the Moravian missionaries] became generally known, it was recognized as a crime against humanity."

The Lenape allies of the British sought revenge for the Gnadenhutten massacre. When General George Washington heard about the massacre, he ordered American soldiers to avoid being captured alive, as he feared what the hostile Lenape would do to their captives.

Washington's close friend William Crawford was captured while leading an expedition against Lenape at Upper Sandusky, Ohio. Crawford had not been at Gnadenhutten but was killed in retaliation. David Williamson, the officer who had led the Gnadenhutten massacre, was also a survivor of the Crawford expedition. In 1814, decades after the war, he died in poverty. The leader of the Home Guard at the time was Captain John Hay who on November 24 led an attack on the Delaware. Captain Charles Bilderback had participated in the Gnadenhutten massacre and was a survivor of the June 1782 Crawford expedition. Seven years later, in June 1789, he was captured and killed by hostile Lenape in Ohio.

In 1810 Shawnee chief Tecumseh reminded future President William Henry Harrison, "You recall the time when the Jesus Indians of the Delawares lived near the Americans, and had confidence in their promises of friendship, and thought they were secure, yet the Americans murdered all the men, women, and children, even as they prayed to Jesus?"

In 1889, future president Theodore Roosevelt called the atrocity "a stain on frontier character that the lapse of time cannot wash away."

== Shrine and village site ==
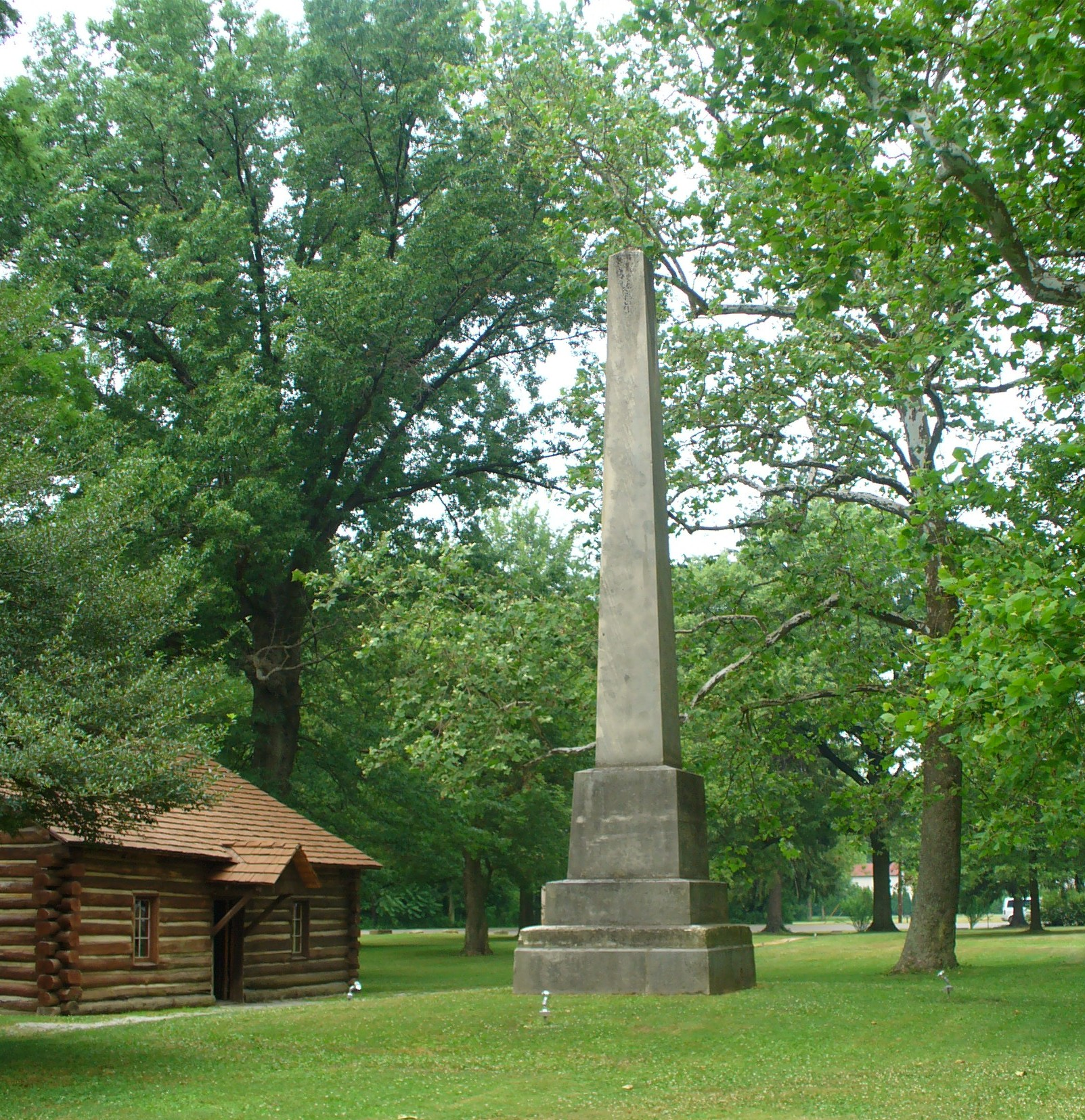
This 37-foot (11 m) monument to the Moravian Christian Indian Martyrs, located next to a reconstructed mission house in what was the center of the original village, was dedicated on June 5, 1872. The inscription reads: "Here triumphed in death ninety Christian Indians, March 8, 1782."

Dedicated by Gerard F. Heath (a member of the Moravian Christian Delaware tribe and the grandson of the man who erected the monument) in 2019, the shrine includes a large Christian cross and monument to the Moravian Christian Indian Martyrs. The granite obelisk was dedicated ninety years after the massacre by Christian Moses Stonefish, a chief of the Christian Munsee tribe that had migrated to Moraviantown; the graves of the victims contain "bones [which] were gathered by the faithful missionaries some time after the massacre". These missionaries included John Heckewelder and David Peter, who buried the remains in 1799. The state reconstructed a typical mission house and cooper's shop on the site of the village. The village site has been preserved and is listed on the National Register of Historic Places. Gerard F. Heath, a descendant of the Delaware Martyrs and the grandson of Christian Moses Stonefish, stated at the 2019 service held to remember them, that though the area is a site of mourning, it is also a place of "honoring the Christian people who died on the site during the American Revolutionary War."

== Representation in culture ==
- Western writer Zane Grey included a fictional treatment of the Gnadenhutten Massacre in his historical novel The Spirit of the Border (1906).
- Dancing through Fire (2012) by JoAnn Hague is a novel exploring the events from 1775 to 1782 which culminated in the massacre. Under the working title, Huts of Grace, the book won a 1984 Ohio Arts Council Fellowship Grant in Creative Writing.
- Trumpet in the Land, a long-running outdoor drama in Ohio, depicts the Gnadenhutten massacre and the events leading up to it.
- Lucy Ellmann mentions the Gnadenhutten massacre in Ducks, Newburyport.
- The Gnadenhutten massacre is mentioned in Blood Meridian.
