= David Zeisberger =

American missionary of the Moravian Church (1721–1808)

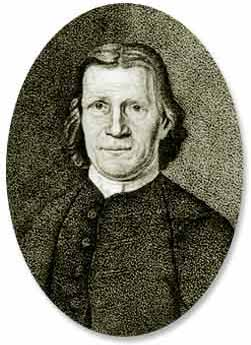
- A caption on the print states that it is "From a portrait painted at the age of forty."
- Born: April 11, 1721; Zauchtenthal, Moravia, Holy Roman Empire (present day Czech Republic)
- Died: November 17, 1808 (aged 87) (Goshen Township, Tuscarawas County, Ohio)
- Occupations: Missionary, Clergyman, translator
- Spouse: Susanna Lecron
- Parent(s): David Zeisberger; Rosina Zeisberger

David Zeisberger (April 11, 1721 – November 17, 1808) was a Moravian clergyman and missionary among the Native American tribes who resided in the Thirteen Colonies. He established communities of Munsee (Lenape) converts to Christianity in the valley of the Muskingum River in Ohio; and for a time, near modern-day Amherstburg, Ontario.

== Biography ==
Zeisberger was born in Zauchtenthal, Moravia (present day Suchdol nad Odrou in the Czech Republic) and moved with his family to the newly established Moravian Christian community of Herrnhut, on the estate of Count Nicolaus Ludwig von Zinzendorf in the German Electorate of Saxony in 1727. However, when his family migrated to the newly established colony of Georgia, Zeisberger remained in Europe to complete his education. In 1738, he came to Georgia in the Thirteen Colonies, with the assistance of governor of Georgia James Edward Oglethorpe. He later rejoined his family in the Moravian community at Savannah, Georgia. At the time, the United Brethren had begun a settlement, merely for the purpose of preaching the gospel to the Creek Indians. From there he moved to Pennsylvania, and assisted at the commencement of the settlements of Nazareth and Bethlehem.

In 1739, Zeisberger was influential in the development of a Moravian community in Bethlehem, Pennsylvania, and was there at its dedication on Christmas Eve 1741. Four years later, at the invitation of Hendrick Theyanoguin, he came to live among the Mohawk. He became fluent in the Onondaga language and assisted Conrad Weiser in negotiating an alliance between the Thirteen Colonies and the Iroquois in Onondaga (near present-day Syracuse, New York). Zeisberger also produced dictionaries and religious works in Iroquoian and Algonquian.

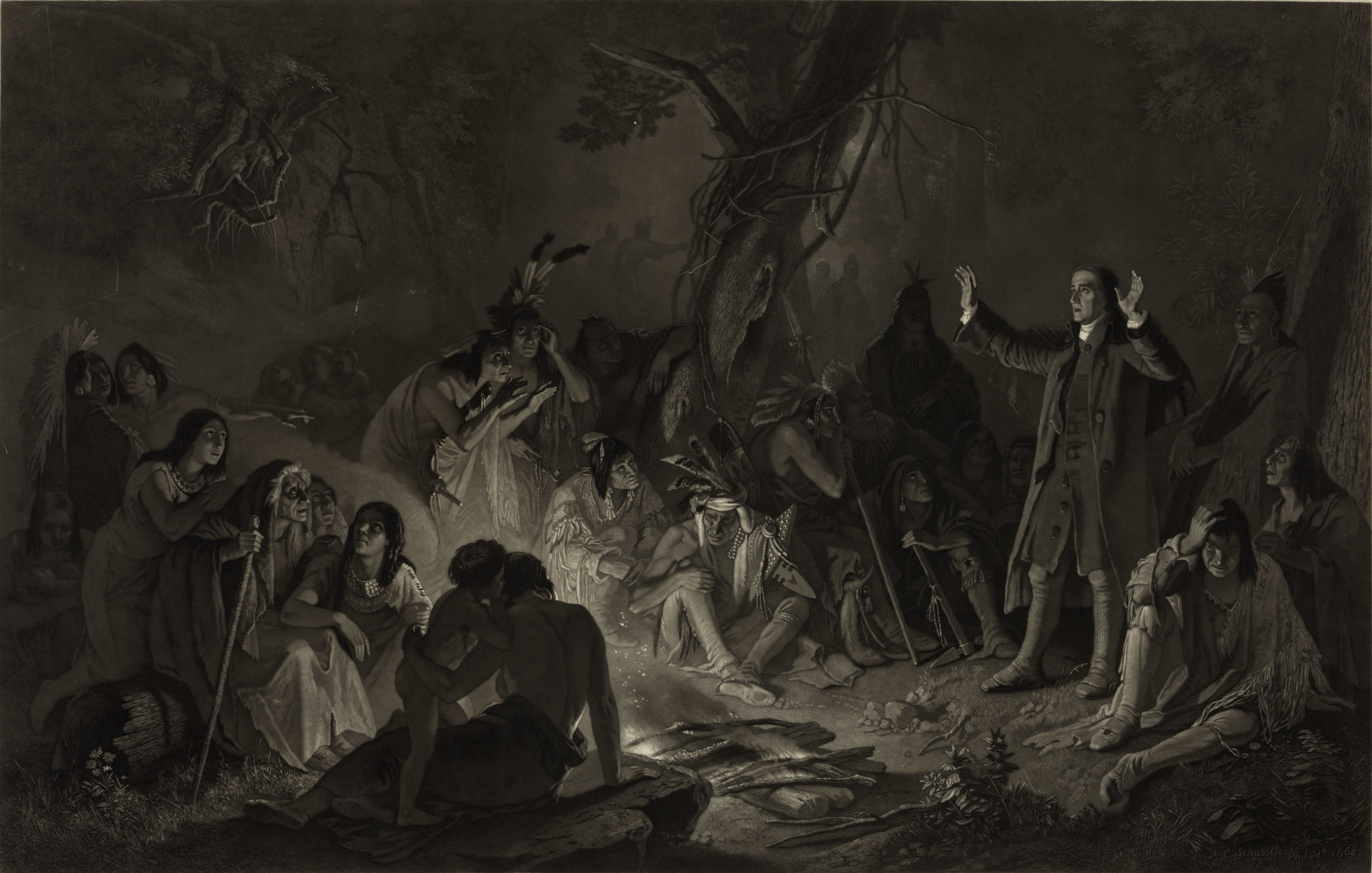
1864 print of 1862 oil painting, The Power of the Gospel: Zeisberger Preaching to the Indians, by Christian Schussele

Zeisberger began as a missionary to Native American peoples following his ordination as a Moravian minister in 1749. He worked in Kuskusky among the Lenape (Delaware) of Pennsylvania, focusing his efforts on converting as many Indians as possible to Christianity. He was the senior missionary of the United Brethren (as the Moravians sometimes referred to themselves) among the Indians. His relations with the British took a turn for the worse during the American Revolutionary War (as they suspected he was providing aid to the American patriots, and in 1781 he was arrested and detained at Fort Detroit. While he was detained, ninety-six of his Native converts in Gnadenhutten, Ohio were brutally murdered by Pennsylvania militiamen, an event known as the Gnadenhutten Massacre.

After Zeisberger was released, violent conflicts with other Native tribes and the expansion of white settlement forced many Moravian Christian settlements to relocate to present-day Michigan and Ontario. A large group of Munsee moved there in 1782, but Zeisberger later returned to live the rest of his life among the Native converts remaining near the village of Goshen (in present Goshen Township, Tuscarawas County, Ohio). Zeisberger spent a period of 62 years, excepting a few short intervals, as a missionary among the Indians. He died on November 17, 1808, at Goshen, Ohio, on the river Tuscarawas, at the age of 87. Zeisberger is buried in Goshen.

== Works ==
- 1821: Samuel Lieberkühn, David Zeisberger (translator) The History of our Lord and Saviour Jesus Christ
- 1885: Diary of David Zeisberger
- 1887: Zeisberger's Indian Dictionary
- 1888: Essay of an Onondaga Grammar
- 1910: Archer Butler Hulbert (editor) David Zeisberger's History of Northern American Indians
