= Delaware languages =

Native American languages centered around the Delaware River

Delaware
- Lënapei èlixsuwakàn
- Geographic distribution: United States, in modern times Canada; Around the lower Delaware and Hudson rivers in the United States; one or two Munsee speakers in Canada; Unami groups in Oklahoma
- Native speakers: 1 (2022, Munsee); Unami spoken as a second language by Native Americans of the Delaware Tribe of Indians
- Linguistic classification: Algic: Algonquian; Eastern Algonquian; Delawaran; Delaware
- Subdivisions: Munsee; Unami

Language codes
- ISO 639-2 / 5: del
- ISO 639-3: del
- Glottolog: comm1246
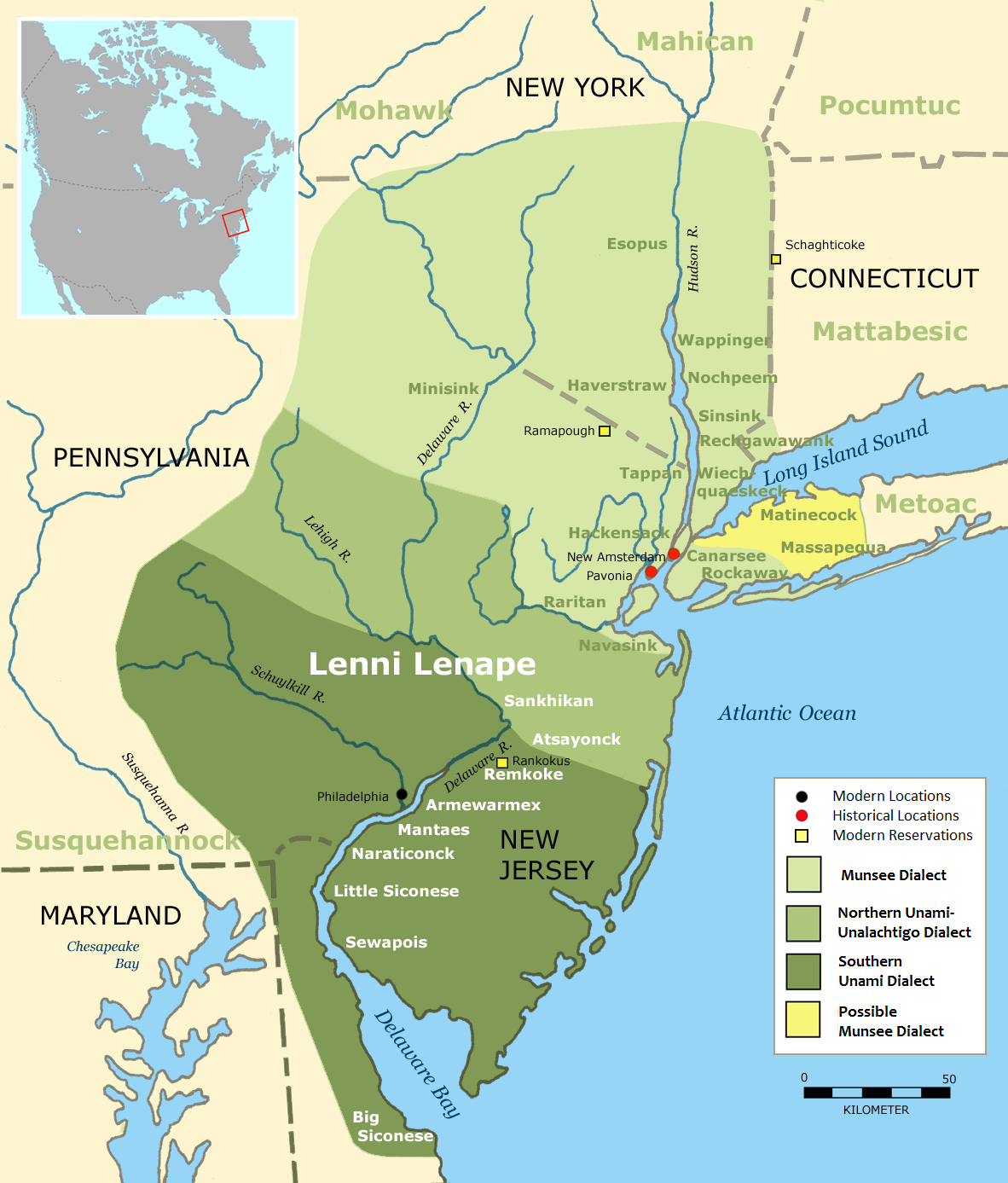
- Map showing the aboriginal boundaries of Delaware territories, with Munsee territory and Unami dialectal divisions indicated

- Person: Lënape (Monsi / Wënami)
- People: Lënapeyok (Monsiyok / Wënamiyok)
- Language: Lënapei èlixsuwakàn (Monsii èlixsuwakàn / Wënami èlixsuwakàn)
- Country: Lënapehòkink

The Delaware languages, also known as the Lenape languages (Delaware: Lënapei èlixsuwakàn), are Munsee and Unami, two closely related languages of the Eastern Algonquian subgroup of the Algonquian language family. Munsee and Unami were spoken aboriginally by the Lenape people in the vicinity of the modern New York City area in the United States, including western Long Island, Manhattan Island, Staten Island, as well as adjacent areas on the mainland: southeastern New York State, eastern Pennsylvania, New Jersey, Connecticut, Maryland, and Delaware.

== Classification ==
The Lenape language is part of the Algonquian branch of the Algic language family, and is part of the Eastern Algonquian language grouping which is considered to be a genetically related sub-grouping of Algonquian.

The languages of the Algonquian family constitute a group of historically related languages descended from a common source language, Proto-Algonquian, which was descended from Algic. The Algonquian languages are spoken across Canada from the Rocky Mountains to the Atlantic coast; on the American Plains; south of the Great Lakes; and on the Atlantic coast. Many of the Algonquian languages are now sleeping.

The Eastern Algonquian languages, spoken on the Atlantic coast from what are now called the Canadian Maritime provinces to what is now called North Carolina; many of the languages are now sleeping, and some are known only from very fragmentary records. Eastern Algonquian is considered a genetic subgroup within the Algonquian family, that is, the Eastern Algonquian languages share a sufficient number of common innovations to suggest that they descend from a common intermediate source, Proto-Eastern Algonquian. The linguistic closeness of Munsee and Unami entails that they share an immediate common ancestor which may be called Common Delaware; the two languages have diverged in distinct ways from Common Delaware.

Several shared phonological innovations support a genetic subgroup consisting of the Delaware languages and Mahican, sometimes referred to as Delawaran. Nonetheless Unami and Munsee are more closely related to each other than to Mahican. Some historical evidence suggests commonalities between Mahican and Munsee.

The line of historical descent is therefore Proto-Algonquian > Proto-Eastern Algonquian > Delawarean > Common Delaware + Mahican, with Common Delaware splitting into Munsee and Unami.

== Geographic distribution ==
Lenni Lenape means 'Human Beings' or the 'Real People' in the Unami language. Their autonym is also spelled Lennape or Lenapi, in Unami Lënape and in Munsee Lunaapeew meaning 'the people.' The term Delaware was used by the English, who named the people for their territory by the Delaware River. They named the river in honor of Lord De La Warr, the governor of the colony at Jamestown, Virginia. The English colonists used the exonym Delaware for almost all the Lenape people living along this river and its tributaries.

It is estimated that as late as the 17th century there were approximately forty Lenape local village bands with populations of possibly a few hundred persons per group. Estimates for the early contact period vary considerably, with a range of 8,000–12,000 given. Other estimates for approximately 1600 AD suggest 6,500 Unami and 4,500 Munsee, with data lacking for Long Island Munsee. These groups were never united politically or linguistically, and the names Delaware, Munsee, and Unami postdate the period of consolidation of these local groups. The earliest use of the term Munsee was recorded in 1727, and Unami in 1757.

At the time of first contact with European colonists in the 17th century, the Lenape resided in relatively small communities consisting of a few hundred people. The intensity of contact with European settlers resulted in the gradual displacement of some of the Lenape people from their aboriginal homeland, in a series of population movements of genocidal intent involving forced relocation and consolidation of small local groups, extending over a period of more than two hundred years. This is also referred to as The Long Walk. It was due to the new United States breaking the first treaty it had ever signed. The currently used names were gradually applied to the larger groups resulting from the genocidal forced relocation policy of the United States. The ultimate result was the displacement of virtually all Lenape-speaking people from the region to present-day Oklahoma, Kansas, Wisconsin, Upstate New York, and Canada.

Two distinct Unami-speaking groups emerged in Oklahoma in the late 19th century, the Registered (Cherokee) Delaware in Washington, Nowata, and Craig Counties, and the Absentee Delaware of Caddo County. Until recently there were a small number of Unami speakers in Oklahoma; the language is now extinct there as a first language, but is spoken fluently as a learned language by enrolled members of the two Delaware tribes in Oklahoma. Some language revitalization work is underway by the Delaware Tribe of Indians.

Equally affected by consolidation and dispersal, Munsee groups moved to several locations in southern Ontario as early as the late 18th century, to Moraviantown, Munceytown, and Six Nations. Several different patterns of migration led to groups of Munsee speakers moving to Stockbridge in present-day Wisconsin, Cattaraugus in present-day New York state, and Kansas. In 1892 the Munsee-Delaware and Moraviantown children were sent to Mount Elgin Residential School where only English language was permitted to be spoken. The Lenape language began its disappearance along the Grand River in Six Nations and to rapidly vanish in Munsee-Delaware Nation. Only in Moraviantown the Lenape language was used on a daily basis from a majority of the nation and help on the preservation of the language. Today Munsee survives only at Moraviantown, where there are two fluent first language speakers aged 77 and 90 as of 2018. There are no fluent speakers left in the Munsee-Delaware nation of the Lenape people living in Canada; however, there are members working to revitalize the language within the community.

=== Language revitalization ===
From 2009 through at least 2014, a Lenape language class was taught at Swarthmore College in Swarthmore, Pennsylvania. The class focused on beginner phrases and grammar, but also included information about the history and culture of the Lenape people. Books used in the class included Conversations in Lenape Language and Advanced Supplements (both written by De Paul).

=== Dialects and varieties ===
Munsee and Unami are linguistically very similar. They are both dialects of one language by Lenape speakers, and together are referred to as the language of the Lenni Lenape or Delaware Indians, as can be seen in the Grammar of the language of the Lenni Lenape or Delaware Indians, written by the Moravian missionary David Zeisberger and published in a translation from German into English by Peter Stephen du Ponceau in 1827. Zeisberger does not even mention the "dialect" names when describing varying grammatical features, while the translator refers to them in two annotations. Despite their relative closeness the two are sufficiently distinguished by features of syntax, phonology, and vocabulary that speakers of both consider them not mutually intelligible so that, more recently, linguists have treated them as separate languages.

Munsee Delaware was spoken in the central and lower Hudson River Valley, western Long Island, the upper Delaware River Valley, and the northern third of New Jersey in present-day North Jersey. While dialect variation in Munsee was likely there is no information about possible dialectal subgroupings.

Unami Delaware was spoken in the area south of Munsee speakers in the Delaware River Valley and New Jersey, south of the Delaware Water Gap and the Raritan Valley.

Three dialects of Unami are distinguished: Northern Unami, Southern Unami, and Unalachtigo.

Northern Unami, now extinct, is recorded in large amounts of materials collected by Moravian missionaries but is not reflected in the speech of any modern groups. The Northern Unami groups were south of the Munsee groups, with the southern boundary of the Northern Unami area being at Tohickon Creek on the west bank of the Delaware River and between Burlington and Trenton on the east bank.

The poorly known Unalachtigo dialect is described as having been spoken in the area between Northern and Southern Unami, with only a small amount of evidence from one group.

Southern Unami, to the south of the Northern Unami-Unalachtigo area, is reflected in the Unami Delaware spoken by Delawares in Oklahoma.

=== Ethnonyms ===
Names for the speakers of Munsee and Unami are used in complex ways in both English and the Lenape language. The Unami dialect (called a language by non-native speaker students of Lenape) is sometimes called Delaware or Delaware proper, reflecting the original application of the term Delaware to Unami speakers. Both Munsee and Unami speakers use Delaware if enrolled and Lenape if not enrolled as a self-designation in English.

The Unamis residing in Oklahoma are sometimes referred to as Oklahoma Delaware, while the Munsees in Ontario are sometimes referred to as Ontario Delaware or Canadian Delaware.

Munsee-speaking residents of Moraviantown use the English term Munsee to refer to residents of Munceytown, approximately 50 km (31 mi) to the east and refer to themselves in English as "Delaware", and in Munsee as /lənáːpeːw/ 'Delaware person, Indian'. Oklahoma Delawares refer to Ontario Delaware as /mwə́nsi/ or /mɔ́nsi/, terms that are also used for people of Munsee ancestry in their own communities.

Some Delawares at Moraviantown also use the term Christian Indian as a preferred self-designation in English. The equivalent Munsee term is ké·ntə̆we·s, meaning "one who prays, Moravian convert".

Munsee speakers refer to Oklahoma Delawares as Unami in English or /wə̆ná·mi·w/ in Munsee. The Oklahoma Delawares refer to themselves in English as Delaware and in Unami as /ləná·p·e/.

The name Lenape, which is sometimes used in English for both Delaware languages together, is the name Unami speakers also use for their own language in English, whereas Munsee speakers call their language in English Lunaapeew. Uniquely among scholars, Kraft uses Lenape as a cover term to refer to all Delaware-speaking groups.

Munsee speakers refer to their language as /hə̀lə̆ni·xsəwá·kan/, meaning "speaking the Delaware language".

== Phonology ==
Munsee and Unami have similar but not identical inventories of consonants and vowels, and have a significant number of phonological rules in common. For example, both languages share the same basic rules for assigning syllable weight and stress. However, Unami has innovated by regularizing the assignment of stress in some verb forms so that the penultimate syllable is stressed even when the stress assignment rule would predict stress on the antepenultimate syllable. As well, Unami has innovated relative to Munsee by adding phonological rules that significantly change the pronunciation of many Unami words relative to the corresponding Munsee words.

This section focuses upon presenting general information about Munsee and Unami sounds and phonology, with detailed discussion reserved for entries for each language.

Munsee and Unami have the same basic inventories of consonants, as in the following chart.

General Delaware consonants
| | Bilabial | Dental | Post- alveolar | Velar | Glottal |
|---|---|---|---|---|---|
| Nasal | m | n | | | |
| Stop | p | t | tʃ ⟨č⟩ | k | |
| Fricative | | s | ʃ ⟨š⟩ | x | h |
| Lateral | | l | | | |
| Glides | w | | j ⟨y⟩ | | |

In addition, Unami is analysed as having contrastive long voiceless stops: p·, t·, č·, k·; and long voiceless fricatives: s·, š·, and x·. The raised dot /·/ is used to indicate length of a preceding consonant or vowel. A full analysis and description of the status of the long consonants is not available, and more than one analysis of Delaware consonants has been proposed. Some analyses only recognize long stops and fricatives as predictable, i.e. as arising by rule. The contrastive long consonants are described as having low functional yield, that is, they differentiate relatively few pairs of words, but nonetheless do occur in contrasting environments. Both languages have rules that lengthen consonants in certain environments.

Several additional consonants occur in Munsee loan words: /f/ in e.g. nə̀fó·ti 'I vote'; /r/ in ntáyrəm.

A number of alternate analyses of Munsee and Unami vowels have been proposed. In one, the two languages are analysed as having the same basic vowel system, consisting of four long vowels /i· o· e· a·/, and two short vowels /ə a/. This vowel system is equivalent to the vowel system reconstructed for Proto-Eastern-Algonquian. Alternative analyses reflect several differences between the two languages. In this analysis Munsee is analysed as having contrasting length in all positions, with the exception of /ə/. In cells with two vowels, the first is long.

Munsee vowels
| | Front | Central | Back |
|---|---|---|---|
| High | i·, i | | o·, o |
| Mid | e·, e | ə | |
| Low | | a·, a | |

Similarly, Unami vowels have also been analysed as organized into contrasting long-short pairs. One asymmetry is that high short /u/ is paired with long /o·/, and the pairing of long and short /ə/ is noteworthy. In cells with two vowels, the first is long.

Unami vowels
| | Front | Central | Back |
|---|---|---|---|
| High | i·, i | | o·, u |
| Mid | e·, e | ə·, ə | ɔ·, ɔ |
| Low | | a·, a | |

== Writing systems ==
There is no standard writing system for either Munsee or Unami. However, the people who are enrolled in the Delaware Tribe of Indians have developed a spelling system that is the most recent standard for writing in the Unami dialect. Out of respect to this intellectual property of The Delaware Tribe of Indians their standard for writing in the Unami dialect should be used. As well, the Muncy at the Six Nations Reserve in what is now called Canada have done the same standardization for the Munsee dialect. In Aboriginal teaching materials used by provincial governments this newest standard for Munsee is used in order to teach Muncy to children in the school system.

Linguists have tended to use common phonetic transcription symbols of the type found in the International Phonetic Alphabet or similar Americanist symbols in order to represent sounds that are not consistently represented in conventional standard writing systems.

Europeans writing down Delaware words and sentences have tended to use adaptations of European alphabets and associated conventions. The quality of such renditions have varied widely, as Europeans attempted to record sounds and sound combinations they were not familiar with.

Practical orthographies for both Munsee and Unami have been created in the context of various language preservation and documentation projects. A recent bilingual dictionary of Munsee uses a practical orthography derived from a linguistic transcription system for Munsee. The same system is also used in a recent word book produced locally at Moraviantown.

The online Unami Lenape Talking Dictionary uses a practical system distinct from that for Munsee. However, other practically oriented Unami materials use a writing system with conventional phonetic symbols.

=== Comparison ===
The table below presents a sample of Unami words, written first in a linguistically oriented transcription, followed by the same words written in a practical system. The linguistic system uses the acute accent to indicate predictable stress and a raised dot (·) to indicate vowel and consonant length. The practical system interprets the contrast between long and corresponding short vowels as one of quality, using acute and grave accents to indicate vowel quality. Stress, which as noted is predictable, and consonant length are not indicated in the practical system.

Comparison of linguistic and practical orthographies for Unami
| Linguistic | Practical | English | Linguistic | Practical | English | Linguistic | Practical | English | Linguistic | Practical | English |
|---|---|---|---|---|---|---|---|---|---|---|---|
| kwə́t·i | kwëti | one | kwə́t·a·š | kwëtash | six | wčé·t | wchèt | sinew, muscle | tə́me | tëme | coyote, wolf |
| ní·š·a | nìshi | two | ní·š·a·š | nishash | seven | ɔ́·k | òk | and | tá·x·an | taxàn | piece of firewood |
| naxá | naxa | three | xá·š | xash | eiɡht | xkó·k | xkuk | snake | ahsə́n | ahsën | stone |
| né·wa | newa | four | pé·škunk | pèshkunk | nine | skɔ́ntay | skòntay | door | hiló·səs | hilusës | old man |
| palé·naxk | palènàxk | five | télən | tèlën | ten | kší·k·an | kshikàn | knife | lə́nu | lënu | man |

The table below presents a sample of Munsee words, written first in a linguistically oriented transcription, followed by the same words written in a practical system. The linguistic system uses a raised dot ⟨·⟩ to indicate vowel length. Although stress is mostly predictable, the linguistic system uses the acute accent to indicate predictable main stress. As well, predictable voiceless or murmured /ă/ is indicated with the breve accent ⟨˘⟩. Similarly, the breve accent is used to indicate an ultra-short [ə] that typically occurs before a single voiced consonant followed by a vowel. The practical system indicates vowel length by doubling the vowel letter, and maintains the linɡuistic system's practices for marking stress and voiceless/ultra-short vowels. The practical system uses orthographic ⟨sh⟩ for the phonetic symbol /š/, and ⟨ch⟩ for the phonetic symbol /č/.

Comparison of linguistic and practical orthographies for Munsee
| Linguistic | Practical | English | Linguistic | Practical | English | Linguistic | Practical | English | Linguistic | Practical | English |
|---|---|---|---|---|---|---|---|---|---|---|---|
| ampi·lamé·kwa·n | ambiilaméekwaan | needle | nkwə́ta·š | ngwútaash | six | wčéht | wchéht | sinew, muscle | ăpánšəy | ăpánzhuy | log, timber |
| nə̆wánsi·n | nŭwánsiin | I forgot it | ní·ša·š | níishaash | seven | xwánsal | xwánzal | his older brother | ntəší·nsi | ndushíinzi | I am named so and so |
| máske·kw | máskeekw | swamp, pond | xá·š | xáash | eight | ăpwá·n | ăpwáan | bread | óhpwe·w | óhpweew | he smokes |
| wə́sksəw | wúsksuw | he is young | ătíhte·w | ătíhteew | it is ripe | kíhkay | kíhkay | chief | máxkw | máxkw | bear |
| kwi·škwtó·nhe·w | kwiishkwtóonheew | he whispers | áhpăpo·n | áhpăpoon | chair | xwáškwšəš | xwáshkwshush | muskrat | pé·nkwan | péenɡwan | it is dry |

== Vocabulary ==
=== Loan words ===
Both Munsee and Unami have loan words from European languages, reflecting early patterns of contact between Delaware speakers and European traders and settlers. The first Europeans to have sustained contact with the Delaware were Dutch explorers and traders, and loan words from Dutch are particularly common. Dutch is the primary source of loan words in Munsee and Unami.

Because many of the early encounters between Delaware speakers and Dutch explorers and settlers occurred in Munsee territory, Dutch loanwords are particularly common in Munsee, although there are also a number in Unami as well.

Many Delaware borrowings from Dutch are nouns that name items of material culture that were presumably salient or novel for Delaware speakers, as is reflected in the following borrowed words.

Munsee and Unami Words From Dutch
| Munsee | Unami | Dutch |
|---|---|---|
| hé·mpət | hémpəs | hemd [hɛmpt] 'shirt, vest' |
| á·pə̆ləš | á·p·ələš | appels ['ɑpəls] 'apples' |
| kə̆nó·p | kənó·p | knoop [kno:p] 'button' |
| šə̆mə́t | šəmit | smid [smɪt] 'blacksmith' |
| pó·təl | pó·t·əl | boter ['bo:tər] 'butter' |
| šó·kəl | šó·k·əl | suiker ['sœɥkər] 'sugar' |
| mó·kəl | mɔ́·k·əl | moker ['mo:kər] 'maul', 'sledgehammer' |

More recent borrowings tend to be from English such as the following Munsee loan words: ahtamó·mpi·l 'automobile'; kátəl 'cutter'; nfó·təw 's/he votes'.

There is one known Swedish loan word in Unami: típa·s 'chicken', from Swedish tippa, 'a call to chickens'.

== See also ==
- Christian Munsee
- Delaware People
- Moraviantown
- Munceytown
