= Delaware Nation =

American Indian tribe in Oklahoma

Èhëliwsikakw Lënapeyok

Total population
- 2,255 enrolled citizens (2024)

Regions with significant populations
- United States (Oklahoma)

Languages
- English, Delaware (Unami, Munsee)

Religion
- Christianity, Native American Church, traditional tribal religion

Related ethnic groups
- other Lenape and Algonquian peoples

The Delaware Nation (Delaware: Èhëliwsikakw Lënapeyok), based in Anadarko, Oklahoma is one of three federally recognized tribes of Lenape or Delaware Indians in the United States, along with the Delaware Indians based in Bartlesville, Oklahoma and the Stockbridge–Munsee Community of Wisconsin. Two Lenape First Nations are in Ontario, Canada.

The Delaware Nation was also known as the Delaware Tribe of Western Oklahoma and was sometimes called the Absentee or Western Delaware.

== Government ==
Map of Delaware Nation's tribal jurisdictional area (OTSA) and nearby jurisdiction areas, shared with Wichita and Affiliated Tribes and Caddo Nation.

Delaware Nation had 2,255 enrolled citizens in the 2024 fiscal year.

As of March 16, 2019, Delaware Nation enrollment criteria was changed from a minimum blood quantum of 1/8 blood to lineal descendancy by vote during a secretarial election.

The Delaware Nation's tribal complex is located two miles (3 km) north of Anadarko, Oklahoma on Highway 281. Their tribal jurisdictional area is located within Caddo County, Oklahoma. They operate their own housing authority and issue tribal vehicle tags.

As of 2025, the Delaware Nation Executive Committee are:

- President: Michael McLane
- Vice President: Victoria De La Rosa-Feliciano
- Secretary: Margaret Ann Brower
- Treasurer: Phyllis Pack
- Committee Member: Deborah Dotson
- Committee Member: Terry Williams

== Economic development ==
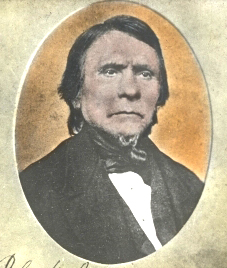
Chief Black Beaver of the Lenape, 1806–1880

The nation's annual economic impact was estimated at $5 million in 2010. Their tribal casino, Gold River Bingo and Casino, is located north of Anadarko. In August 2012, the Delaware Nation opened Casino Oklahoma located in Hinton, OK.

== Language ==
The Delaware peoples historically spoke the Delaware languages (also known as the Lenape languages): Munsee and Unami, two closely related languages of the Eastern Algonquian subgroup of the Algonquian language family.

== History ==
The Lenape people comprised three dialectal divisions, which by the end of the 17th century became the basis for the three clans of the Lenape. These divisions were the Monsi (Munsee) or Wolf, the Unami or Turtle, and the Unilactigo or Turkey. Today the clans are known as the Tùkwsit (Wolf Clan), Pùkuwànko (Turtle Clan), and Pële (Turkey Clan). The Delaware Nation is the Pùkuwànko (Turtle Clan).

The Delaware were the second Indian nation to enter into a treaty with the newly formed government of the United States; representatives signed the Treaty of Fort Pitt on September 17, 1778.

The Oklahoma branches date from 1867 with the purchase of land by Delaware from the Cherokee Nation; they made two payments totaling $438,000. A court dispute followed over whether the sale included citizenship rights for the Delaware within the Cherokee Nation. In 1867, the courts ruled that they had only purchased rights to the land for their lifetimes.

The Curtis Act of 1898 dissolved tribal governments and ordered the allotment of tribal lands to individual citizens of tribes. The Lenape fought the act in the courts, but lost. The lands were allotted in 160-acre (650,000 m^{2}) lots in 1907, with any land left over sold to non-Indians.

The Delaware Nation became federally recognized on July 5, 1958, as the "Delaware Tribe of Western Oklahoma". They ratified their current constitution in 1972. In November 1999, the tribe officially changed its name to the "Delaware Nation".

In September 2000, the Delaware Nation of Oklahoma received 11.5 acres of land in Thornbury Township, Delaware County, Pennsylvania

In 2004, the Delaware Nation sued Pennsylvania over land lost in 1800. The case related to the colonial government's Walking Purchase of 1737, an agreement of doubtful legal veracity. The court held that the justness of the extinguishment of aboriginal title is nonjusticiable, including in the case of fraud. Because the extinguishment occurred prior to the passage of the first Indian Nonintercourse Act in 1790, that Act did not avail the Delaware.

As a result, the court granted the Commonwealth's motion to dismiss. In its conclusion the court stated: "... we find that the Delaware Nation's aboriginal rights to Tatamy's Place were extinguished in 1737 and that, later, fee title to the land was granted to Chief Tatamy—not to the tribe as a collectivity."

== Notable Western Delaware ==
- Black Beaver (1806–1880), Delaware leader, scout, and rancher
- Holly Wilson (born 1968), Delaware multi-media artist

== See also ==
- List of federally recognized tribal governments of Lenape
  - Delaware First Nation of Six Nations, Ontario (member of the Haudenosaunee Confederacy)
  - Delaware Nation, Oklahoma
  - Delaware Nation at Moraviantown, Ontario (Christian Munsee)
  - Delaware Tribe of Indians, Oklahoma
  - Munsee-Delaware Nation, Ontario
  - Stockbridge-Munsee Community, Wisconsin (Partially Lenape, also Mohican)
