= Mohican language =

Extinct Algonquian language of US

Mohican
- Native to: United States
- Region: New York, Massachusetts, Vermont
- Ethnicity: Mohicans
- Extinct: ca. 1940
- Revival: 2010s onward
- Language family: Algic: Algonquian; Eastern Algonquian; Delawaran; Mohican
- Dialects: Moravian; Stockbridge

Language codes
- ISO 639-3: mjy
- Glottolog: mahi1248

Mohican, also known as Mahican, is a language of the Eastern Algonquian subgroup of the Algonquian language family, itself a member of the Algic language family. It was spoken in the territory of present-day eastern New York state and Vermont by the Mohican people. The last semi-proficient speaker died in the 1930s. Present day tribal members reject the term extinct and prefer to refer to the language as slumbering since elders have continuously taught children a limited number of words and phrases. Preliminary efforts to revive Mahican have been made since 2017, but much work remains to be done before a consensus can be reached among tribal members to resolve certain disputed phonological and morphosyntactic aspects of the language.

== History ==
Aboriginally, speakers of Mohican lived along the upper Hudson River in New York State, extending as far north as Lake Champlain, east to the Green Mountains in Vermont, and west near Schoharie Creek in New York State. Conflict with the Mohawk of the Iroquois Confederacy in competition for the fur trade, and European encroachment, triggered displacement of the Mohicans, some moving to west-central New York, where they shared land with the Oneida. After a series of dislocations, some Mohicans were forced to relocate to Wisconsin in the 1820s and 1830s, while others moved to several communities in Canada, where they lost their Mohican identity.

The Mohican language became extinct in the early twentieth century, with the last recorded documentation of Mahican made in the 1930s.

== Dialects ==
Two distinct Mohican dialects have been identified, Moravian and Stockbridge. These two dialects emerged after 1740 as aggregations arising from the dislocation of Mohican and other groups. The extent of Mohican dialect variation prior to this period is uncertain.

The Stockbridge dialect emerged at Stockbridge, Massachusetts, and included groups of New York Mohican, and members of other linguistic groups such as Wappinger (a once-large Munsee-speaking tribe south of the Mohican), Housatonic, Wawyachtonoc, and others. After a complex migration history, the Stockbridge group moved to Wisconsin, where they combined with Munsee Lenape migrants from southwestern Ontario. They are now known as the Stockbridge-Munsee tribe.

The Moravian dialect arose from population aggregations centred at Bethlehem, Pennsylvania. Some Mohican groups that had been affiliated from about 1740 with the Moravian Church, in New York and Connecticut, moved in 1746 to Bethlehem. Another group affiliated with the Moravians moved to Wyoming, Pennsylvania. Subsequent to several members being massacred by white settlers, some members of these groups fled to Canada with Munsee Moravian converts, ultimately settling at what is now Moraviantown, where they have completely merged with the dominant Lenape population. Another group moved to Ohsweken at Six Nations, Ontario, where they merged with other groups at that location.

== Documentation ==
Mohican linguistic materials consist of a variety of materials collected by missionaries, linguists, and others, including an eighteenth-century manuscript dictionary compiled by Johann Schmick, a Moravian missionary. In the twentieth century, linguists Truman Michelson and Morris Swadesh collected some Mohican materials from surviving speakers in Wisconsin.

== Phonology ==
Mohican historical phonology has been studied based upon the Schmick dictionary manuscript, tracing the historical changes affecting the pronunciation of words between Proto-Algonquian and the Moravian dialect of Mohican, as reflected in Schmick’s dictionary. The similarities between Mohican and the Delaware languages Munsee and Unami have been acknowledged in studies of Mohican linguistic history. In one classification Mohican and the Delaware languages are assigned to a Delawaran subgroup of Eastern Algonquian.

=== Consonants ===
Mohican consonants
	Labial	Alveolar	Palato- alveolar	Palatal	Velar	Labio- velar	Uvular	Glottal
Nasal	m	n						
Stop	p	t			k	kʷ		
Affricate		ts	tʃ					
Fricative		s	ʃ		x		χ	h
Approximant				j		w		

=== Vowels ===
/a, ã, aː, ʌ, ʌ̃, ə, ɛ, e, ɪ, i, ɔ, o, u, aɪ, aʊ/

== Vocabulary ==
The table below presents a sample of Mohican words, written first in a linguistically oriented transcription, followed by the same words written in a practical system that has been used in the linguistically related dialect of Munsee. The linguistic system uses a raised dot (·) to indicate vowel length. Although stress is mostly predictable, the linguistic system uses the acute accent to indicate predictable main stress. As well, predictable voiceless or murmured /ă/ is indicated with the breve accent (˘). Similarly, the breve accent is used to indicate an ultra-short [ə] that typically occurs before a single voiced consonant followed by a vowel. The practical system indicates vowel length by doubling the vowel letter, and maintains the linɡuistic system's practices for marking stress and voiceless/ultra-short vowels. The practical system uses orthographic ⟨sh⟩ for the phonetic symbol /š/, and ⟨ch⟩ for the phonetic symbol /č/.

Comparison of linguistic and practical orthographies for Mohican
Linguistic	Practical	English	Linguistic	Practical	English
xí·kan	xíikan	knife	ntah	ndah	my heart
kə̆tahəwá·nun	ktahwáanun	I love you	ni·táhkan	niitáhkan	My older brother
stá·w	stáaw	fire	mpəy	mbuy	water
wəná·yəw	wunáayuw	he is good	kíhkayi·t	kíhkayiit	chief
wtayá·tamun	wtayáatamun	He requires or wants it	na·ní·wi·	naaniiwih	nine
təmahí·kan	tmahíikan	ax	ahtá·w	ahtáaw	It is there
wəmí·san	wmíisan	His older sister	nəmá·sak	nmáasak	fish (plural)
tá·páwá·š	táapáwáash	seven	sí·pəw	síipuw	river
nəyáh nkí·spih	nuyáh ngíispih	I am full	máxkw	máxkw	bear
nətahəwá·tamun	ndahwáatamun	I love it	só·kəná·n	sóoknaan	It is raining

Numbers
ngwútah	one
níisah	two
naxáh	three
náawah	four
náanan	five
ngwútaash	six
taapáwaash	seven
xáasoh	eight
naaníiwih	nine
mdáanut	ten

== See also ==
- Mohicans
- Stockbridge-Munsee Community
