= Papunhank =

Papunhank was born in the early 18th century. He was a Munsee man whose ancestors were notable sachems. He spent his entire life growing up in the area around the Susquehanna Valley, a region which increasingly became embroiled in violence between settlers and Indigenous nations, including Munsee, Conoy, Nanticoke, Mahican, and Lenape. While Papunhank eventually converted to Christianity, during his early life he had been regarded as a prophet in Munsee society. Up until the 1750s he reportedly struggled with an alcohol problem but following the death of his father, he isolated himself for five days in the woods and was struck by a spiritual vision which had a profound impact on his life. He became even further devoted to God, and renounced alcohol and became a pacifist. Papunhank came to use aspects of both Christianity and traditional Munsee spirituality, and was seen as a medicine man by many of his people.

Scholars such as Earl Olmstead have argued that white settlement pressure caused Papunhank, alongside his family and other Munsee people to start a village named Machiwihilusing upon the Susquehanna river. Amongst the village which had a population of some 300 people, almost half became followers of Papunhank, and to European settlers they became known as “Quaker or religious Indians”, emphasizing the perceived gap between the two cultures. His syncretism of Munsee spirituality and Christianity was a source of conflict with some European missionaries, who sought a decreased emphasis on Indigenous traditional world views. Some of these Europeans went so far as to call him a heathen, criticizing his adaptation of Christianity as offensive. Papunhank invited some Moravian Christians to visit the village in the year 1756, where concerns were raised over the outbreak of the Seven Years War and general anxieties about the deterioration in Indigenous-settler relations were discussed.

Papunhank’s skills as a negotiator and diplomat are worth noting, both for his impact within Indigenous society and in his interactions with colonial officials. He became critical of economic agreements made with colonial governments, and in 1760 refused offers of gifts from Pennsylvania, pointing to the ways in which some of these gift giving agreements had been used to exploit Indigenous communities into disadvantageous treaties. Instead, he adopted an argument that trade relationships should not be based on kinship ties, drawing on his Christian faith to emphasize that economic agreements should be equitable under God, attempting to find new grounds for more advantageous arrangements for his community. Papunhank would again formulate criticisms and questions for Quaker missionaries in 1761, suggesting that although Europeans claimed to adhere to the Bible, they frequently interacted with Indigenous people in a way that clearly disregarded their scripture. As he argued, the Bible was supposed to direct the way in which Europeans lived their lives, yet they clearly adopted it only when it suited them, while continuing to dictate to Indigenous people how they should live their lives.

Michael Goode is one scholar who has argued that Papunhank, in addition to his efforts to support temperance within his community, lobbied for cutting alcohol sales and trading by white settlers, efforts which gained him further attention from Quaker society. Papunhank’s critique of alcohol and its effect on society had a profound impact, as he became a model of piety and temperance to Quakers, many of whom were involved in the alcohol trade. The location of Machiwihilusing with its proximity to the Pennsylvania settlements, encouraged Papunhank to engage in these diplomatic exchanges, attempting to bridge the gap between the communities by making himself an indispensable ally to the Pennsylvania government. For example, he reached out to the governor in 1763 after the Paxton Boys massacred some Susquehannock Indigenous people, appealing to settlers’ common faith in an attempt to de-escalate the cyclical violence of the period. His efforts to bring about more peaceful relationships with settlers at times brought him trouble from Indigenous groups, at one point he was attacked and injured with a tomahawk for accosting some Indigenous people who had stolen horses from colonizers. While Papunhank may not have wielded a position of power over all Munsee people, he certainly held enough influence to catch the attention of missionaries, several of whom visited his village. When he preached to a Quaker audience via means of a translator, some in attendance came to believe that he had been blessed with direct communication with God and were struck with his similarities to their religious world views.

One Quaker who took the journey to Machiwihilusing was John Woolman, who felt compelled to do so after having met Papunhank earlier in 1761 when he had been in Philadelphia. To embark on such a journey during a time of increasing violence speaks to his dedication to see Papunhank again, visiting his village despite language and cultural barriers. He would write fondly of his time spent in the region, describing feelings of mutuality while engaging in a shared feeling of religious experience that contrasted much of the violence that surrounded them. In 1763, Papunhank was baptised as a Moravian by a prominent missionary and clergyman David Zeisberger, during his visit to the settlement. He adopted the name Johannes, and in the context of heightened colonial violence infringing upon their village he petitioned officials in Philadelphia to start a new settlement with Moravian support. This settlement began in 1765 and came to be known as Friedenshuetten, which was composed of mostly Munsee and Mohicans with a limited number of Moravian settlers. This community was short-lived and was displaced by 1768 following an influx of white British colonizers. In 1771 an accusation was leveled against Papunhank by another Munsee healer, who alleged that Papunhank may have poisoned a community member. These rumours were ultimately sidelined but are reflective of divisions within his social group. Papunhank retained his spiritual and religious views until he eventually died May 15, 1775. He left behind a daughter named Sophia.
