= Munsee language =

Algonquian language

Munsee
- Huluníixsuwaakan; Monsii èlixsuwakàn
- Native to: Canada; United States
- Region: now in Ontario; formerly in New York, New Jersey, Pennsylvania
- Ethnicity: 400 Munsee (1991)
- Native speakers: 1 (2022)
- Language family: Algic: Algonquian; Eastern Algonquian; Delawaran; Delaware; Munsee

Language codes
- ISO 639-3: umu
- Glottolog: muns1251
- ELP: Munsee
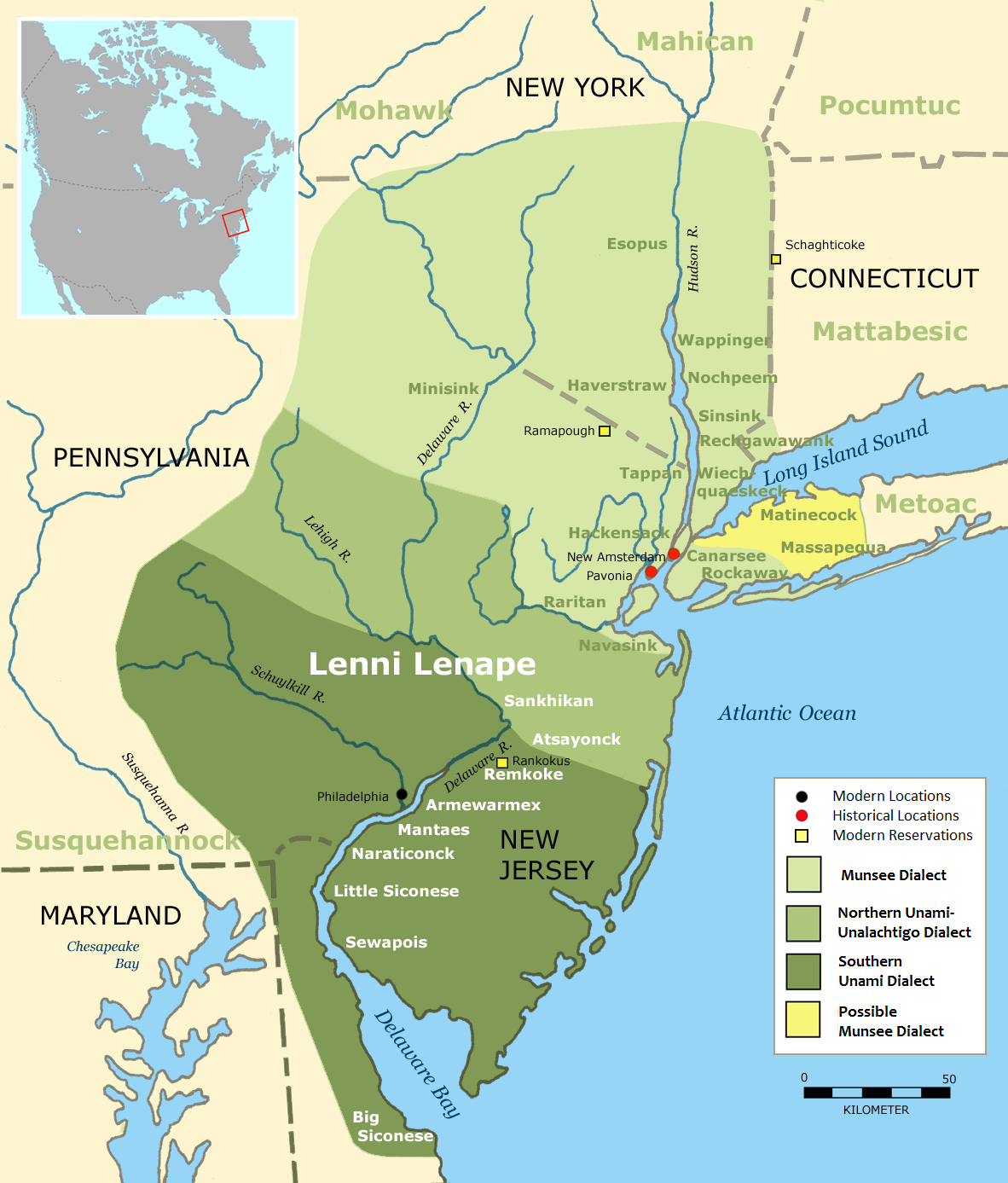
- Munsee
- Coordinates: 42.57, –81.879

- Person: Monsi, Lënape
- People: Monsiyok, Lënapeyok
- Language: Monsii èlixsuwakàn, Lënapei èlixsuwakàn
- Country: Lënapehòkink

Munsee (also known as Munsee Delaware, Delaware, Ontario Delaware, Delaware: Huluníixsuwaakan, Monsii èlixsuwakàn) is an endangered language of the Eastern Algonquian subgroup of the Algonquian language family, itself a branch of the Algic language family. Munsee is one of two Delaware languages (also known as Lenape languages, after the tribe's autonym). It is very closely related to the Unami Delaware, but the two are sufficiently different that they are considered separate languages. Munsee was spoken aboriginally by Lenape in the vicinity of the modern New York City area in the United States, including western Long Island, Manhattan Island, Staten Island, as well as adjacent areas on the mainland: southeastern New York State, the northern third of New Jersey, and northeastern Pennsylvania.

As of 2018, Munsee was spoken only on the Moraviantown Reserve in Ontario, Canada, by two elderly individuals, aged 77 and 90, making it critically endangered. As of 2022, only one elderly native speaker remained. When the number of speakers was somewhat larger, the language was reported to differ between individual speakers, each having a personal dialect. There has been interest in learning the language by younger individuals. Some researchers and universities have partnered with indigenous communities in an effort to revitalize the language, notably Montclair State University and the University of Toronto.

== History ==
Munsee is an Eastern Algonquian language. The hypothetical common ancestor language from which the Eastern Algonquian languages descend is Proto-Eastern Algonquian (PEA). An intermediate group, Delawaran, a descendant of Proto-Eastern Algonquian, consists of Mahican and Common Delaware, the latter being a further subgroup comprising Munsee Delaware and Unami Delaware. The justification for Delawaran as an intermediate subgroup rests upon the high degree of similarity between Mahican and the two Delaware languages, but relatively little detailed argumentation in support of Delaware has been adduced.

Munsee is demonstrably phonologically conservative, and is considered to have retained many of the phonological characteristics of PEA. In comparison, Unami has undergone extensive phonological innovation, coupled with morphological regularization.

The PEA vowel system consisted of four long vowels *i·, *o·, *e·, *a·, and two short vowels *a and ə. The vowel history is as follows: *i· (from PEA merger of Proto-Algonquian (PA *i· and *i to PEA *i·), *o· (from PEA merger of PA *o· and *o ), *e· (from Proto-Algonquian *e·), and *a· (from Proto-Algonquian *a·; the short vowels are*ə (from Proto-Algonquian *e), and *a (from Proto-Algonquian *a). This system was continued down to Common Delaware, but Munsee and Unami have innovated separately with respect to the vowel systems.

Contrastive vowel length for Munsee high vowels has been reintroduced, and also for the front mid-vowels. For modern Munsee it is necessary to recognize long /i·, o·, e·, a·/ and short /i, o, e, a/. Innovating instances of short /i, o, and e/ arise from for example reduplicating syllables and loan words.

== Classification ==
Munsee is an Eastern Algonquian language, which is the sole recognized genetic subgroup descending from Proto-Algonquian, the common ancestor language of the Algonquian language family. Munsee is very closely related to Unami Delaware. Munsee and Unami constitute the Delaware languages, comprising a subgroup within Eastern Algonquian. Taken together with Mahican, the Delaware languages constitute Delawaran, a subgroup within Eastern Algonquian.

The term Munsee developed as an English name for the aggregated group that formed along the upper Delaware River north of the Delaware Water Gap. Other Munsee dialect speakers joined the Minisink group; the earliest recorded mention of Munsee dates from 1725. Minisink is a Munsee term meaning 'at the island', and is to be transcribed mə̆nə́sənk. It is the locative form of a now disused word /mənə́s/ 'island' (no source given, not a form given in records and not a normal Munsee noun ending; viz. manan, manhan; form suggests 'small island'); cognates in other Algonquian languages are e.g. Ojibwe minis, 'island'. Orthographic ⟨ink⟩ in the form Minisink is the modern Munsee locative suffix /-ənk/ (discussed below in the section "Grammar"). The term Munsee is the English adaptation of a regularly formed word, mə́n'si·w 'person from Minisink'.

Over time the British extended the term Munsee to any speaker of the Munsee language. Attempts to derive Munsee from a word meaning 'stone' or 'mountain', as proposed by Brinton, are incorrect. Kraft's claim that Munsee is not an indigenous term, and that it results from a "corruption" of English use of Minisink is incorrect. The term follows a regular pattern of Munsee word formation.

=== Ethnonyms ===
Names for the speakers of Munsee are used in complex ways in both English and in Munsee. The Unami language is sometimes treated as "Delaware" or "Delaware proper", reflecting the original application of the term Delaware to Unami speakers, but Munsee speakers use Delaware as a self-designation in English. The term Delaware was originally applied by British colonists to Unami speakers living along the Delaware River, which is named after Lord De La Warr, the first governor of Virginia. The term was gradually extended to refer to all Delaware groups.

The Munsee in Ontario are sometimes referred to as "Ontario Delaware" or "Canadian Delaware". Munsee-speaking residents of Moraviantown use the English term Munsee to refer to residents of Munceytown, approximately 50 km (31 mi) to the east. In English, Moraviantown residents call themselves Delaware, and in Munsee /lənáːpeːw/ 'Delaware person, Indian'.

Some Delaware at Moraviantown also use the term Christian Indian as a preferred self-designation in English. The equivalent Munsee term is ké·ntə̆we·s 'one who prays, Moravian convert'. Munsee speakers refer to Oklahoma Delaware as Unami in English or /wə̆ná·mi·w/ in Munsee. The English term Lenape is of Unami origin, and is used in English as a self-designation by speakers of Unami;

Exceptionally among scholars, Kraft uses Lenape as an English-language cover term to refer to all Delaware-speaking groups, while noting that this usage is "not entirely appropriate".

Munsee speakers refer to their language as /hə̀lə̆ni·xsəwá·kan/, literally 'speaking the Delaware language'.

== Linguistic variation ==
In a 2010 paper titled "The Personal Dialects of Moraviantown Delaware", Ives Goddard studied extensively how there were personal dialectal differences between eight native Munsee speakers from the 1960s. However, as of April 2022, only one fluent speaker of Munsee remained, an elderly woman named Dianne Snake.

=== Phonological variation ===
==== Optional pronunciation of final /-w/ ====
Nouns and verbs that end in -i·w, -e·w and -a·w; some speakers often dropped the -w. This drop also carried over into "careful speech".

==== Particles originally in /-i/ and /-e/ ====
A large class of particles and pre-words that are usually heard with final /-ɘ/ retained the original /-i/ in the speech of some speakers.

==== Verb endings originally in /-i/ and /-e/ ====
Words that end with the negative suffix /-wi/ or the subjunctive suffix /-e/ had variants with final /-ɘ/.

==== Particles originally in /-Í·wi/ ====
Another large class of particles and pre-words are found in older sources ending in /-Í·wi/, e.g.

=== Other lexicalized variations ===
==== Variation between | a | and | ə | ====
Some words have variation between underlying | a | and | ə |. It is possible to determine which vowel is older and which might be the innovation by using evidence from other Algonquin languages, other Munsee communities and earlier sources.

==== Variation between short and long vowels ====
An initial and three words show variation between short and long vowels. These words are:

ans ~ a·ns - 'scoop': ánsham ~ á·nsham 'he dips up water'

me·xalapó·ti·s ~ me·xa·làpó·ti-s 'spider'

wekó·li·s ~ we·kó·li·s 'whippoorwill'

yankw(ǎ)té·ho·n ~ ya·nkw(ă)té·ho·n 'apron'

==== Variation between | nš | and | nč | ====
Two words have | nš | varying with | nč |.

These words are xwaskó-nšəy ~ xwaskó-nčəy 'corncob' and sànǎkó-nšə̃yak ~ sànǎkó-nčə̃yak 'elderberries'.

==== Other differences in a single segment ====
A number of cases are present where one segment varies or is variably present.

For example, /t/ is replaced by /k/ in le·làpatíhte·k (etc.) ~ le·làpatíhke·k (etc.) 'juneberry'.

==== Nouns with variably present /-əw/ ====
Some nouns are found with and without a final /-əw/.

==== Bird names with | l | ~ | n | ====
In two bird names, | l | varies with | n |.

For example: taskãmális ~ taskamáni·s 'kingfisher'; ši·wa·pé·kăli·š ~ ši·wa·pé·kăni·š 'bluebird'.

==== More complex variation ====
Some words have more complex patterns of variation. For example, the word 'table' – e·həntáxpwi·nk is the original. The word is sometimes changed to e·həntáxpo·n, which is the same word but it is reshaped as a derived noun.

==== Different words ====
Some cases involve different words or "highly divergent variants" used as synonyms. For example, there are four ways to say 'eyelashes' that are seen in the personal dialects.

=== Variation origination ===
There is no community norm, as the more widely used variants do not define a community norm for either the speakers or the linguist. Additionally, some variants cannot be rated as more and less popular or acceptable; "even a normative description would have to give both or all of them."

Some variation originates externally. Some usages can be traced directly to the Northern Unami language that was earlier spoken by some members of the Munsee community.

Some variation originates internally. These pronunciations and grammatical tendencies are likely to have emerged in the not too distant past.

== Geographic distribution ==
Speakers of Munsee originally resided in the greater Manhattan area, the drainage of the Lower Hudson River valley, and the upper Delaware River. The arrival of European explorers, traders and settlers resulted in the progressive displacement of Munsee people over a period of several centuries. Munsee groups affected by this process ultimately moved away from their homeland to communities in both the United States and Canada.

In the 20th century, surviving Munsee speakers in Canada lived at Six Nations, Ontario; Munceytown, Ontario; and Moraviantown Reserve. Now extinct in the first two locations, the language is used only by a few elders at Moraviantown, Ontario.

Since the early 21st century, the language has been taught to tribal members of the Stockbridge-Munsee Band of Mohican Native Americans, and the Delaware Nation, Moraviantown Reserve.

=== Original location ===
The southern boundary of Munsee territory was the area north of the Delaware Water Gap, following the river system southeast along the Raritan River to the Atlantic Ocean. To the south of the Munsee were the Unami Delaware. To the north were the Algonquian Mahican, and to the east were the Eastern Long Island peoples, who also spoke Algonquian languages, such as Unquachog (also spelled Unkechaug) and southern New England languages, such as Quiripi. (Quiripi and Unquachog are likely members of a dialect continuum of a single language.)

Aboriginally, and for a period subsequent to the arrival of Europeans, Munsee was spoken within a series of small and largely autonomous local bands, located primarily within the drainage of the Hudson and upper Delaware rivers, the major river systems of the area. The general pattern, found throughout the Eastern Algonquian area, was one in which indigenous groups resided along the drainages of major river systems, with divisions between upriver and downriver groupings. Named groups were found on the major tributaries; they developed larger sites on the main streams and smaller camps at the headwaters and on feeder streams. Estimates vary, but these local groups may have had a population of up to two hundred people each. These groups spoke localized varieties of the language now called Munsee, but there is little information on dialect variation within the Munsee-speaking area.

The primary known named Munsee groups, from north to south on the west side of the Hudson River, were the

- Esopus, west of the Hudson River in the Hudson River watershed (with subgroups the Waoranecks, Warranawankongs, and others);
- Minisink (above the Delaware Water Gap);
- Haverstraw, Tappan, and Hackensack, south of the Hudson Highlands west of the Hudson River;
- Raritan, who originally resided on the lower Raritan River and moved inland;
- Wiechquaeskeck, from east of the Hudson who migrated to the lower Raritan after 1649; with the
- Navasink, to the east along the north shore of New Jersey east of the Delaware River.

The Wappinger were to the east of the upper Hudson; below them going north to south on the east bank of the Hudson were the

- Kichtawank;
- Sinsink;
- Rechgawawank;
- Nayack;
- Marechkawieck, with the Canarsee and Rockaway on western Long Island; and
- Massapequa and Matinecock on central Long Island, who may have been Munsee or perhaps were the predecessors of the Unquachog group identified in the eighteenth century.

The disruptions resulting from the entry of European settlers, fur traders, and explorers led to the displacement of these local groups. They gradually consolidated into larger groups that brought together speakers from the different groups within the Munsee-speaking area.

== Phonology ==
Munsee phonology is complex but regular in many regards. Metrical rules of syllable weight assignment play a key role in the assignment of word-level stress, and also determine the form of rules of vowel syncope that produce complex but mostly regular alternations in the forms of words. Word-level stress is largely predictable, with exceptions occurring primarily in loan words, reduplicated forms, and in words where historical change has made historically transparent alternations more opaque.

=== Consonants ===
Munsee has the following inventory of consonants; International Phonetic Alphabet (IPA) values are given in brackets.

Munsee consonant phonemes
	Bilabial	Dental	Postalveolar	Velar	Glottal
Stop	p	t	č [tʃ]	k	
Fricative		s	š [ʃ]	x	h
Nasal	m	n			
Approximant	w	l	y [j]		

Some loanwords from English contain /f/ and /r/: fé·li·n 'there is a fair going on'; ntáyrəm 'my tire'.

=== Vowels ===
Munsee vowels
	Front	Central	Back
High	i· [iː], i [ɪ]		o· [oː], o [ʊ]
Mid	e· [ɛː], e [ɛ]	ə	
Low		a· [aː], a [ʌ]	

Different analyses of the Munsee vowel system have been proposed. Goddard (1979) presents an analysis in which Munsee and Unami have the same vowel system, unchanged from the Proto-Eastern-Algonquian vowel system (discussed in the History section below). In this analysis, there are four long vowels /i·, o·, e·, a·/ and two short vowels /a, ə/. Vowel length is indicated with a raised dot (·). However, in modern Munsee there are several sources of new short /i, o, e/ that arise from such sources as reduplication, loan words, and other various phonological changes, and that cannot be derived from other underlying vowels. Hence an analysis in which there are four positions that have contrastive vowel length, as well as /ə/, is appropriate.

The short vowel /i/ has the phonetic value [ɪ]. Short /a/ has values centring on [ʌ], with [a] occurring before [hC] (where 'C' represents any stop or the lateral consonant). Short /o/ has values centring on [ʊ]. The long vowels /iː, eː, aː, oː/ have the primary values [iː], [ɛː], [aː], and [oː], with /a/ varying to [ɑ], and [ɒ] after labial consonants.

=== Syllable weight ===
Syllable weight plays a significant role in Munsee phonology, determining stress placement and the deletion of certain short vowels. All syllables containing long vowels are strong. Any short vowel in a closed syllable (i.e. (C)VC) is strong. Counting left to right, in a sequence of two or more open syllables containing short vowels, the odd-numbered syllable is weak and the even-numbered syllable is strong. As well, certain syllables containing short vowels (frequently such syllables occur in reduplicated syllables and loan words) must exceptionally be marked as strong.

In words longer than two syllables, the final syllable is excluded from consideration of stress placement, i.e. is extrametrical, and the last strong syllable preceding the final syllable in the word receives the main stress.

(a) payaxkhı́·kan 'rifle' (strong penultimate, receives primary stress)

(b) né·wake 'if I see him' (weak penultimate, preceding syllable receives primary stress)

In disyllabic words a strong penultimate syllable receives primary stress.

(a) á·mwi·w 's/he gets up from lying down' (disyllabic Strong-Strong)

In a disyllable with a weak penultimate syllable, the final syllable is strong, and receives primary stress.

(a) ăsə́n 'stone' (disyllabic Weak-Strong)

== Writing system ==
There is no standard writing system for Munsee. Linguists have tended to use common phonetic transcription symbols of the type found in the International Phonetic Alphabet or similar Americanist symbols in order to represent sounds that are not consistently represented in conventional standard writing systems.

Europeans writing down Delaware words and sentences have tended to use adaptations of European alphabets and associated conventions. The quality of such transliterated renditions has varied widely, as Europeans attempted to record sounds and sound combinations they were not familiar with.

A practical orthography for Munsee has been created in the context of various language preservation and documentation projects. A recent bilingual dictionary of Munsee uses a practical orthography derived from a linguistic transcription system for Munsee. The same system is also used in a recent word book produced locally at Moraviantown. The related Unami language is written using a distinct practical orthography.

=== Writing system samples ===
The table below presents a sample of Munsee words, written first in a linguistically oriented transcription, followed by the same words written in a practical system. The linguistic system uses a raised dot (·) to indicate vowel length. Although stress is mostly predictable, the linguistic system uses the acute accent to indicate predictable main stress. In addition predictable voiceless or murmured /ă/ is indicated with the breve accent (˘). Similarly, the breve accent is used to indicate an ultra-short [ə] that typically occurs before a single voiced consonant followed by a vowel.

The practical system indicates vowel length by doubling the vowel letter and maintains the linɡuistic system's practices for marking stress and voiceless/ultra-short vowels. The practical system uses orthographic ⟨sh⟩ for the phonetic symbol /š/, and ⟨ch⟩ for the phonetic symbol /č/.

Comparison of linguistic and practical orthographies for Munsee
Linguistic	Practical	English
ampi·lamé·kwa·n	ambiilaméekwaan	needle
nkwə́ta·š	ngwútaash	six
wčéht	wchéht	sinew, muscle
ăpánšəy	ăpánzhuy	log, timber
nə̆wánsi·n	nŭwánsiin	I forgot it
xwánsal	xwánzal	his older brother
ní·ša·š	níishaash	seven
ntəší·nsi	ndushíinzi	I am named so and so
máske·kw	máskeekw	swamp, pond
xá·š	xáash	eight
ăpwá·n	ăpwáan	bread
óhpwe·w	óhpweew	he smokes
wə́sksəw	wúsksuw	he is young
ătíhte·w	ătíhteew	it is ripe
kíhkay	kíhkay	chief
máxkw	máxkw	bear
kwi·škwtó·nhe·w	kwiishkwtóonheew	he whispers
áhpăpo·n	áhpăpoon	chair
xwáškwšəš	xwáshkwshush	muskrat
pé·nkwan	péenɡwan	it is dry

== Grammar ==
The grammar of Munsee is characterized by complex inflectional and derivational morphology. Inflection in Munsee is realized through the use of prefixes and suffixes added to word stems to indicate grammatical information, including number (singular or plural), gender, person, possession, negation, obviation, and others.

Nouns use combinations of person prefixes and suffixes to indicate possession and suffixes to indicate gender, number, diminutive, absentive, and obviation.

Verbs use a single set of person prefixes and a series of suffixes in position classes after the verb stem to indicate combinations of person, number, negation, obviation, and others.

== See also ==
- Lenape
- Monsey, New York
