= Munsee =

Band of Lenape Native Americans

Monsiyok
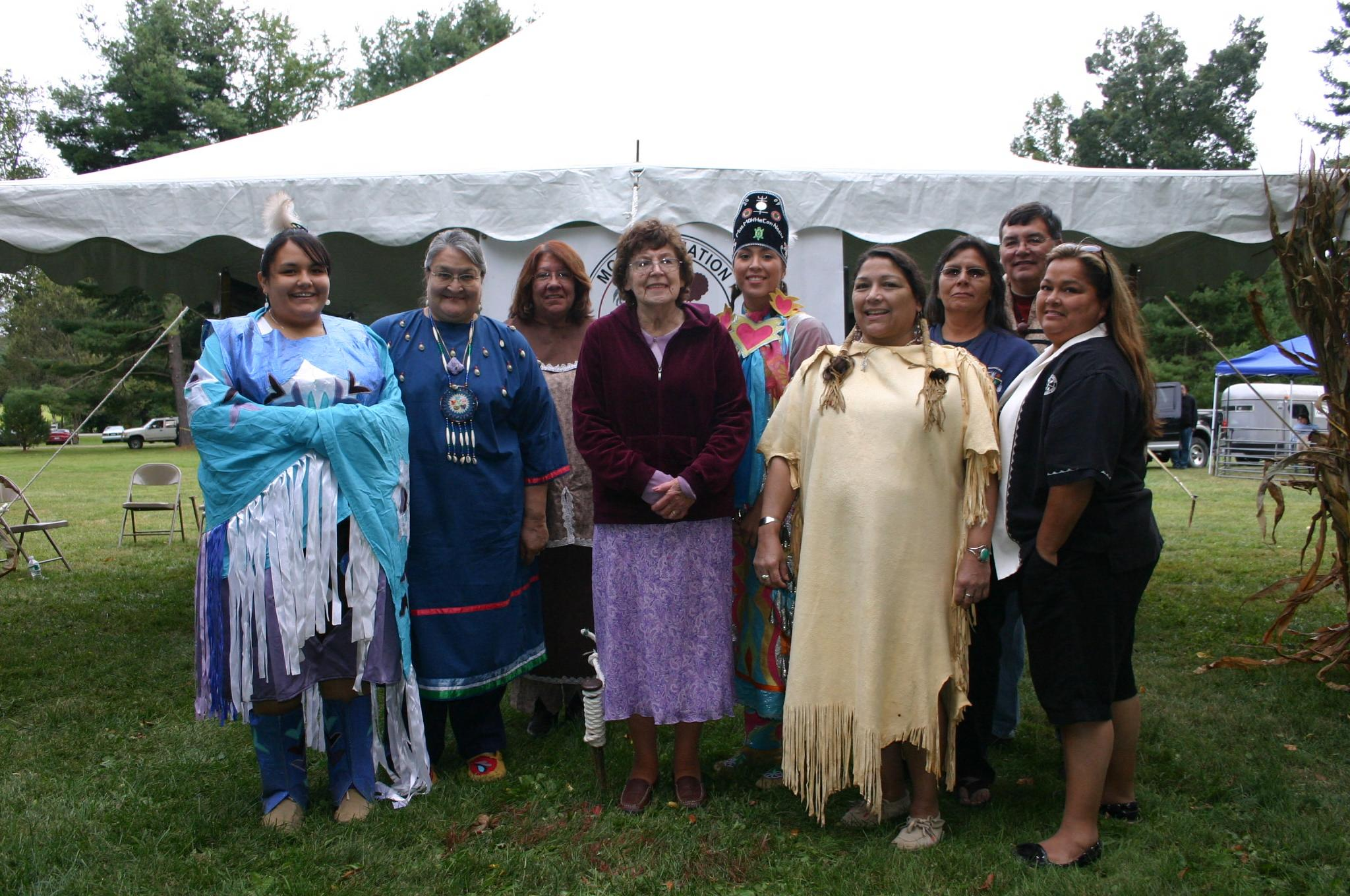
- Stockbridge Munsee Community members in Wisconsin in 2009

Regions with significant populations
- Formerly: New York, New Jersey, and Pennsylvania. Presently: Oklahoma, Ontario, and Wisconsin.

Languages
- English currently and the Munsee language historically

Related ethnic groups
- Other Lenape peoples

- Person: Monsi, Lënape
- People: Monsiyok, Lënapeyok
- Language: Monsii èlixsuwakàn, Lënapei èlixsuwakàn
- Country: Lënapehòkink

The Munsee (Delaware: Monsiyok) are a subtribe and one of the three divisions of the Lenape. Historically, they lived along the upper portion of the Delaware River, the Minisink, and the adjacent country in New York, New Jersey, and Pennsylvania. They were prominent in the early history of New York and New Jersey, being among the first Indigenous peoples of that region to encounter European colonizers.

== Name ==
The name is also spelled Minsi, Muncee, or mə́n'si·w. Munsee derives from Minsi, which in turn comes from Min-asin-ink (also Minisink), a placename that translates as "at the place where stones are gathered together."

== Territory ==
The Munsee originally occupied the headwaters of the Delaware River in present-day New York, New Jersey, and Pennsylvania, extending south to the Lehigh River, and also held the west bank of the Hudson River from the Catskill Mountains nearly to the New Jersey line. They were bordered by the Mohican and Wappinger on the north and east, and fellow Lenape (Delaware) on the south and southeast. They were regarded as a buffer between the southern Lenape and the Haudenosaunee Confederacy based in present-day New York south of the Great Lakes. Their council village was Minisink, probably in Sussex County, New Jersey. The bands along the Hudson were prominent in the early history of New York, but as European-American settlements increased, most of the Munsee moved south to join their relatives along the Delaware.

== History ==
=== 17th and 18th centuries ===
In 1669, the Munsee aided the Esopus people in attacking the Dutch colonists, and were defeated by Martin Cregier in the Esopus Wars. By a fraudulent treaty known as the Walking Purchase, the main body of the Munsee was forced to move from the Delaware River about the year 1740. They settled on the Susquehanna River, on lands assigned them by the Haudenosaunee (Iroquois, 'ökwé'ö:weh - "The only true men"). Soon afterward they moved west, joining the main Lenape settlements on the Ohio River. Most became incorporated with that group. In 1756, those remaining in New York were placed upon lands in Schoharie County and were incorporated with the Mohawk.

A considerable body, the Christian Munsee, who were converted by the Moravian missionaries, drew off from the rest and formed a separate organization, most of them moving to Canada during the American Revolution.

=== 19th century ===
Some Christian Munsee joined the Ojibwe and Stockbridge people in Wisconsin. The majority joined the rest of the Lenape, with whom they participated in their subsequent wars and removals.

In 1837, Christian Munsees, also called Delaware-Munsies, settled among fellow Lenape in Kansas. In 1859, the Christian Munsees moved to Franklin County, Kansas, and joined a band of Ojibwe people who had migrated south from Michigan. By 1891, the combined community numbered 85, and the US government formed an Indian reservation for them. The reservation was broken into individual land allotments in 1900.

=== 20th and 21st centuries ===
The Lenape who kept the name of Munsee were in three bands in the early 20th century in Canada and the United States. Two had consolidated with remnants of other nations so that no separate census is available. These nations were:

- Eelūnaapèewii Lahkèewiit, formerly the Delaware Nation at Moraviantown and Munsee of the Thames, a First Nation headquartered near Thamesville, Ontario
- Chippewa and Munsee, Franklin County, Kansas
- Stockbridge-Munsee Community at Green Bay Agency, Wisconsin, now a federally recognized tribe

== See also ==
- Muncie, Indiana, location of Ball State University
