= Christian Munsee =

Group of Lenape Indians

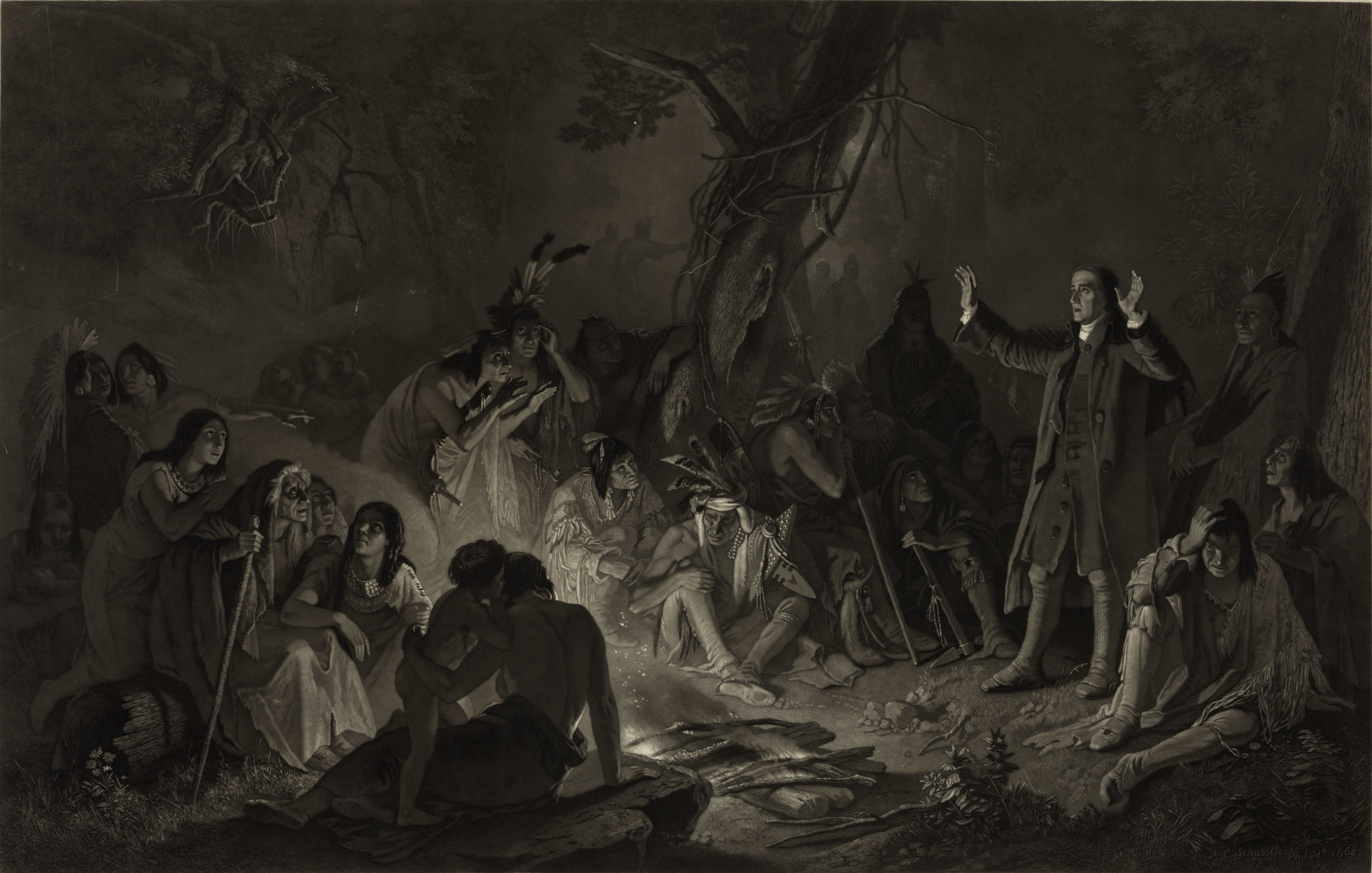
The power of the Gospel: Zeisberger preaching to the Indians by Christian Schussele (1862)

The Christian Munsee are a group of Lenape (also known as Delaware), an Indigenous people in the United States, that primarily speak Munsee and have converted to Christianity, following the teachings of Moravian missionaries. The Christian Munsee are also known as the Moravian Munsee or the Moravian Indians, the Moravian Christian Indians or, in context, simply the Christian Indians. As the Moravian Church transferred some of their missions to other Christian denominations, such as the Methodists, Christian Munsee today belong to the Moravian Church, Methodist Churches, United Church of Canada, among other Christian denominations.

The Christian Munsee tribe has produced several people who have become notable figures in Christianity and the Delaware Nation as a whole, such as Gelelemend (a Lenape chief), John Henry Kilbuck (a Moravian Christian missionary to the Native peoples in Alaska), Papunhank (a Moravian Lenape diplomat and preacher), Glikhikan (Munsee chief, Moravian elder, and Christian martyr), and Washington Jacobs (a chief of the Moravian of the Thames reservation).

Present-day Christian Munsee communities include Moravian of the Thames, the Christian Munsee tribe in Kansas, and the Stockbridge–Munsee Community.

== History ==
Starting in the 1740s, the Moravian Church sent Christian missionaries to North American Indian tribes and started settlements, with full tribal support. The ranks of the Christian Munsee included influential Lenape chiefs from the start. The Moravian Christian approach was to preserve Lenape cultural practices while introducing Lenape to the Gospel message with the entirety of the Christian faith. As such, Moravian Christian missionaries developed the orthography for Lenape dialects and David Zeisberger "compiled dictionaries of various Native tongues, translating them into English and German".

=== Mid-Atlantic states and Ohio ===
The Munsee were the Wolf Clan of the Lenape, occupying the area where present-day New York, Pennsylvania and New Jersey meet. The first recorded European contact occurred in 1524, when Giovanni da Verrazzano sailed into what is now New York Harbor. Like most native peoples of the Atlantic coast, the Munsee suffered from the introduction of European diseases, such as smallpox and influenza, that were endemic among the newcomers, but to which they had no acquired immunity. Those who survived were forced inland by encroaching European settlements.

By the mid-18th century, one group of Lenape people began to follow the teachings of Moravian missionaries. The Moravians were descended from exiled Protestants from Morava, now Czech Republic, who founded a Protestant denomination from Herrnhut in the German state of Saxony. They sought to protect their converts by creating separate mission villages in the frontier, apart from both European settlers and from other native people.

The most prominent missionary among the Munsee was David Zeisberger. In 1772, he led his group of Christian Munsee to the Ohio Country, which he hoped would isolate them from the hostilities of the approaching American Revolution. However, in 1782, a force of Pennsylvania militiamen, in search of Indians who had been raiding settlements in western Pennsylvania, happened upon a group of ninety-six of Zeisberger's Christian Munsee harvesting corn, and rounded them up in the eastern Ohio village of Gnadenhütten. The Munsee protested their innocence of the incidents and explained their Christian convictions and practice of non-combatant and nonresistance. But the militia took a vote and decided to kill all of these "Indians", including the women and children. Those killed are known as the Moravian Christian Indian Martyrs.

While the American militiamen murdered the Moravian Christian Indians in Gnadenhutten, a messenger sent by the Moravian missionaries in Sandusky on March 3 reached Schoenbrunn on March 6 in order to deliver the news that all of them would be moving to Detroit. Two of the Moravian Indians from Schoenbrunn went to tell their brethren in Gnadenhutten but on their journey there, they saw that American soldiers had mangled body of Joseph Schebosh Jr, a Moravian with an Indian mother and European father. They buried his body and quickly returned to warn their brethren in Schoenbrunn as they thought that the others at Gnadenhutten met the same fate. The Moravian Christian Indians at Schoenbrunn fled to Sandusky before the American militiamen could reach Schoenbrunn, where they planned to commit another massacre.

In 1798, David Zeisberger led many of the Moravian Christian Indians back to Ohio, where they established the Goshen Mission near Schoenbrunn. Zeisberger lived there until his death, after which many of the Moravian Christian Indians moved to Ontario (cf. Delaware Nation at Moraviantown) and others to Kansas, along with Christian missionaries who continued to live and work among them. The descendants of Jacob and Ester, the surviving children of Israel Welapachtshechen (who was martyred in the Gnadenhutten massacre), make up the majority of the Christian Munsee tribe in Kansas today.

=== Ontario ===
After ten more years of strife, most of the Christian Munsee followed Zeisberger to Ontario, Canada, where they established a new home at Fairfield, commonly known as Moraviantown, along the Thames River. There they lived in relative peace for twenty years, supporting themselves with their farming and industry.

But they became unwitting victims during the War of 1812, when American soldiers burned their village to the ground during the Battle of the Thames. The battle is well known historically as a victory for United States General William Henry Harrison, and for the death of the Shawnee chief Tecumseh, an ally of the British, but the destruction of Moraviantown is little more than a footnote. The Munsee fled into the wilderness for safe haven until hostilities had ceased, then returned to build a new Fairfield across the Thames River to the south, which is now known as Moraviantown.

In 1903, the Moravian Christians transferred the Munsee mission in Moraviantown to Methodist Christians, a denomination that eventually joined the United Church of Canada. Today many Christian Munsee still belong to this United Protestant denomination.

=== Wisconsin ===
By the 1830s, a faction of the Christian Munsee favored a move to the American West. In 1837, some of the Munsee from Fairfield journeyed to Wisconsin to join another Christian band of Indians, the Stockbridge Indians, a combination of the last remnants of the Mohican and Wappinger peoples of the east bank of the Hudson River in New York, whence the two tribes became known collectively as the Stockbridge-Munsee. They are now the Stockbridge-Munsee Community in Shawano County, Wisconsin.

However, most of the Munsee eventually returned to Canada. The Christian Munsee in southern Ontario remain today as the Moravian of the Thames and the Munsee-Delaware Nation.

=== Kansas ===
A small band of Christian Munsee decided to migrate again, this time to Kansas Territory, to join their non-Christian Lenape kinsmen. They settled first in Wyandotte County, then Leavenworth County. A few families settled near Fort Scott in Bourbon County. By 1857, most of the other Lenape (of Kansas) were removed to Indian Territory (now Oklahoma).

The Christian Munsee, who then numbered less than one hundred, chose to purchase a new reservation in Franklin County from a small band of Ojibwa (Chippewa) that had migrated from Michigan. The Treaty of 1859 officially combined the Swan Creek and Black River Band Chippewa and the Christian Munsee on a reservation of twelve square miles along the Marais des Cygnes River near the town of Ottawa. Signing the treaty for the Munsee were Henry Donohoe, Ignatius Caleb, and John Williams.

Although the two tribes shared a reservation and were considered one tribe by the United States government in all dealings, they maintained their separate identities in cultural and religious practices. The Moravian church continued to send missionaries to the Munsee.

Under the Dawes Act, the Chippewa-Christian Indian Reservation, as it was known in the 1859 treaty, was allotted to the individual members and descendants of the tribes in separate 160-acre plots. The people eventually accepted assimilation. In 1900, the final disbursement of federal funds was paid, and all benefits and official recognition as Native Americans were dissolved. A number of the Christian Munsee Tribe in Kansas live on the reservation in Ottawa, Kansas where they cling to their Christian faith and Lenape heritage.

== Notable members of the Christian Munsee tribe ==
The Christian Munsee tribe has produced several people who have become notable figures in both Christianity and the Delaware Nation as a whole:

- Gelelemend, Lenape chief of the Turtle clan
- John Henry Kilbuck, Moravian Christian missionary to the Native peoples in Alaska
- Papunhank, a Moravian Christian Lenape diplomat and preacher
- Glikhikan, Munsee chief, Moravian Christian elder, and Moravian Christian martyr
- 96 Moravian Christian Indian Martyrs, who practiced nonresistance as they were murdered in the Gnadenhutten massacre on 8 March 1782
- Washington Jacobs, chief of the Moravian of the Thames reservation.

== See also ==
- Praying Indians
- Mission Indians
- Indian Reductions
