= Munsee-Delaware Nation =

Munsee-Delaware Nation Nalahii Lunaapewaak
- Indian reserve
- Munsee-Delaware Nation Indian Reserve No. 1
- Location within Middlesex County Location within Southern Ontario
- Coordinates: 42°48′N 81°29′W
- Country: Canada
- Province: Ontario
- County: Middlesex
- First Nation: Munsee-Delaware
- Formed: 1967

Government
  - Chief: Frank Cooper
  - Federal riding: Middlesex—London
  - Prov. riding: Lambton—Kent—Middlesex

Area
  - Land: 11.22 km^{2} (4.33 sq mi)

Population (2011)
  - Total: 160
  - Density: 14.3/km^{2} (37/sq mi)
- Time zone: UTC-5 (EST)
  - Summer (DST): UTC-4 (EDT)
- Postal Code: N0L
- Area codes: 519 and 226

Munsee-Delaware Nation (Munsee: Nalahii Lunaapewaak, meaning: Lenapes from the Upstream, in contrast with The Lenape at Moraviantown, referred to as "Downstrean Lenapes") is a Lenape First Nations band government located 24 kilometres (15 mi) west of St. Thomas, in southwest Ontario, Canada.

Known previously as the Munsee of the Thames, their land base is the 1,054 hectares (2,600 acres) Munsee-Delaware Nation 1 reserve, with the unincorporated community of Muncey, west from the Oneida Nation of the Thames, as their main community. The reserve is splintered into several non-contiguous areas, made up of individual lots within the Chippewas of the Thames reserve. As of January 2014, their registered population was 612 people, though only 148 lived on their own reserve.

== History ==
Members of the Munsee branch of the Lenape nation arrived in the area in the 18th century. John Graves Simcoe, the lieutenant governor, encouraged the Munsee to settle there although Chippewa were already established there. In 1819 the Chippewa of the Thames reserve was established, and in 1840 the Munsee and the Chippewa finally reached an agreement to share the land. In 1967 the Munsee portion became part of the current reserve, which was established by Order in Council.

== Demographics ==
The Munsee-Delaware First Nation had a registered population of 524 in April 2004, of whom 163 lived on the reserve. By January 2011, the nation had a total registered population of 555, of whom 145 lived on the reserve.

Canada census – Munsee-Delaware Nation 1 community profile

	2021
Population	129 (−15.7% from 2016)
Land area	11.19 km^{2} (4.32 sq mi)
Population density	11.5/km^{2} (30/sq mi)
Median age	38 (M: 40.4, F: 34.8)
Private dwellings	55 (total)
Median household income

References: 2021

== Governance ==
Munsee-Delaware Nation's Chief and Council are elected officials who serve a two (2) year term of office. Elections are governed by their own Band Custom Election Code. Chief and Council are directly accountable to the band membership for the success of the Nation and the conduct of its affairs and for carrying out the community's mission and vision.

The history of Munsee-Delaware Nation elected Chief and Council are:

- 2014 / 2016 Term - Chief Roger Thomas, Head Councillor Aaron Dolson Jr., Councillor Ryan Peters, Councillor Rose Snake, Councillor Candy Thomas
- 2012 / 2014 Term - Chief Patrick Waddilove, Head Councillor Rose Snake, Councillor Frank Cooper, Councillor Dean Snake, Councillor Leander Snake
- Bi-election August 3, 2013 - Chief Roger Thomas
- 2010 / 2012 Term - Chief Patrick Waddilove, Head Councillor Rose Snake, Councillor -

== Services ==
- Administration
- Community Centre (which provides ready access to health care and police services)
- Child Care Centre
- Ontario Works

== See also ==
- Moraviantown
- Christian Munsee
- Delaware People
- Delaware languages
- Munsee language
- List of federally recognized tribal governments of Lenape
  - Delaware First Nation of Six Nations, Ontario (member of the Haudenosaunee Confederacy)
  - Delaware Nation, Oklahoma
  - Delaware Nation at Moraviantown, Ontario (Christian Munsee)
  - Delaware Tribe of Indians, Oklahoma
  - Munsee-Delaware Nation, Ontario
  - Stockbridge-Munsee Community, Wisconsin (Partially Lenape, also Mohican)
