= Stockbridge–Munsee Community =

Federally-recognized Native American tribe

Coordinates: 44°53′55″N 88°51′42″W

Mahiikaniiwak (Mahican) Mahiikaniiyak wąąk Munsiiyak (Mahican)
- Location of Stockbridge–Munsee Indian Reservation

Total population
- 1,565 (2010)

Regions with significant populations
- United States (Shawano County, Wisconsin)

Languages
- English, (originally Mohican and Munsee)

Religion
- Moravian Church, Christian

Related ethnic groups
- Lenape, Mohican, Pequot

The Stockbridge–Munsee Community, also known as the Mohican Nation Stockbridge–Munsee Band (Mahican: Mahiikaniiwak), is a federally recognized Native American tribe formed in the late eighteenth century from communities of so-called "praying Indians" (or Moravian Indians), descended from Christianized members of two distinct groups: Mohican and Wappinger from the praying town of Stockbridge, Massachusetts, and Munsee (Lenape), from the area where present-day New York, Pennsylvania and New Jersey meet. Their land-base, the Stockbridge–Munsee Indian Reservation, consists of a checkerboard of 24.03 square miles (62.2 km^{2}) in the towns of Bartelme and Red Springs in Shawano County, Wisconsin. Among their enterprises is the North Star Mohican Resort and Casino.

In settlement of a large land claim in New York, where the tribe had occupied land in the late 18th and early 19th centuries, in 2010 the state of New York agreed to give the tribe 330 acres in Sullivan County in the Catskills and two acres in Madison County (their former territory). This was in exchange for dropping their larger claim for 23,000 acres of land in Madison (near the city of Syracuse), which they had occupied in the early 19th century. The state granted the tribe the right to develop the Catskills property as a gaming casino. The deal is controversial and opposed by numerous interests, including other federally recognized tribes in New York. The tribe dropped their bid for a gaming casino in New York in June 2014, given a high level of competition from other developers for sites in Orange County, which is closer to the metropolitan market. Another land claim was dismissed by the 2nd Circuit Court of Appeals in June 2014.

== History ==
The Stockbridge–Munsee members are descendants of tribes historically located in the Hudson River valley, New England and the mid-Atlantic areas, respectively, at the time of European encounter. The Stockbridge were Mohicans from the upper east Hudson area who migrated into western Massachusetts in and near Stockbridge before the American Revolutionary War. They became Christianized Indians. In the late eighteenth and early nineteenth centuries, they migrated west to central New York. The Oneida people allowed them to share a 22,000-acre portion of the Oneida Reservation south of Syracuse, New York.

=== 17th–19th centuries ===
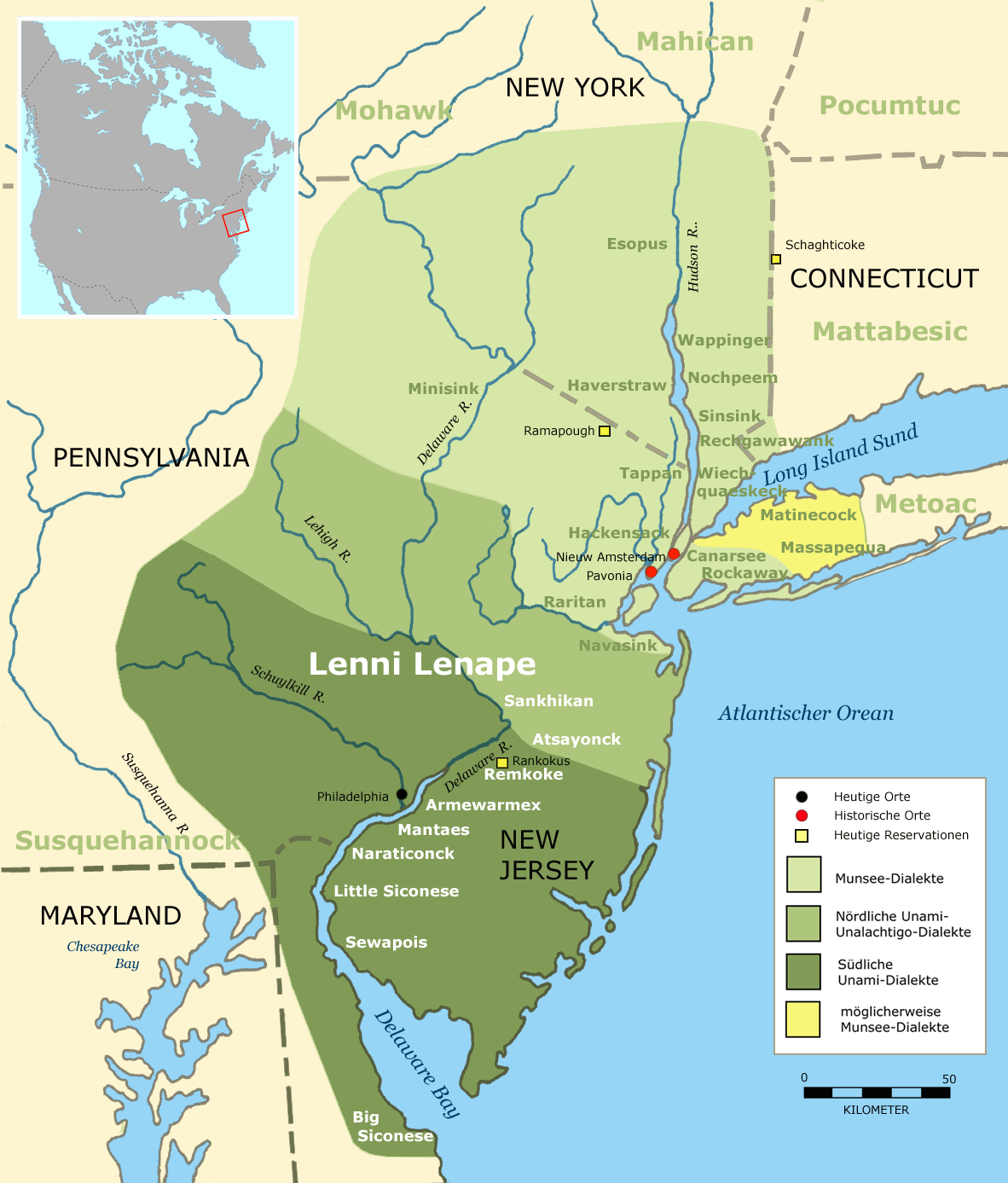
Map showing the aboriginal boundaries of Lenape territories divided by dialect with Munsee speakers in the lightly shaded northernmost area

The Munsee were Lenape who occupied the northern part of their total territory. As they spoke the Munsee dialect, one of the major three branches of the language, they were sometimes referred to by colonists and settlers by that term. They occupied coastal areas around present-day New York City, the western part of Long Island, and northern New Jersey. Lenape to the South spoke two other dialect variations.

After the 1778 Stockbridge Massacre of Stockbridge Militia during the American Revolutionary War, what was left of a combined Mohican and Wappinger community in Stockbridge, Massachusetts left for Oneida County in western New York to join the Oneida people there.

Many Munsee-speaking Lenape also migrated from New Jersey to there by 1802. They were joined there by Brothertown Indians of New Jersey (from a reservation in Indian Mills, New Jersey), as well as by the Stockbridge Indians, which included remnants of the once large Wappinger people and some Mohican. Although the Oneida allowed them to share some of their reservation, eventually the two groups agreed to removal together to present-day Wisconsin. Historically each of these tribes had spoken a distinct Algonquian language.

The Stockbridge–Munsee share a 22,000-acre reservation in Shawano County, Wisconsin. This land was initially assigned to the Menominee, whose homelands these were. Since the late twentieth century, the Stockbridge–Munsee Community has developed the successful North Star Mohican Resort and Casino to generate revenues for welfare and economic development of the tribe. The Brotherton Indians have a separate reservation.

=== Indian termination ===
As part of the Indian termination policy that was followed by the US government from the 1940s to the 1960s, several former New York tribes were targeted for termination. A 21 January 1954 memo by the Department of the Interior advised that a bill for termination was being prepared including "about 3,600 members of the Oneida Tribe residing in Wisconsin." Another memo of the Department of the Interior memo entitled Indian Claims Commission Awards Over $38.5 Million to Indian Tribes in 1964, states that the Emigrant Indians of New York are "(now known as the Oneidas, Stockbridge–Munsee, and Brotherton Indians of Wisconsin)".

In an effort to fight termination and force the government into recognizing their outstanding land claims from New York, the three tribes began filing litigation in the 1950s. As a result of a claim filed with the Indian Claims Commission, the group was awarded a settlement of $1,313,472.65 on August 11, 1964. To distribute the funds, Congress passed Public Law 90-93 81 Stat. 229 Emigrant New York Indians of Wisconsin Judgment Act and prepared separate rolls of persons in each of the three groups to determine which tribal members had at least one-quarter "Emigrant New York Indian blood." It further directed tribal governing bodies of the Oneida and Stockbridge–Munsee to apply to the Secretary of the Interior for approval of fund distributions, thereby ending termination efforts for these tribes.

The law did not specifically state that the Brothertown Indians were terminated; however, it authorized all payments to be made directly to each enrollee, with special provisions for minors to be handled by the Secretary. These payments were not subject to state or federal taxes.

== Reservation ==
The Stockbridge-Munsee Reservation consists of a checkerboard of land across the towns of Bartelme and Red Springs in Shawano County, Wisconsin. When created in 1856, the reservation included both townships in their entirety, amounting to roughly 72 square miles (190 km^{2}). Legislation in 1871 and 1906 nearly eliminated the band's land holdings. The current reservation consists of parcels that the U.S. has placed into trust for the band since the 1930s. In 2009, the United States Court of Appeals for the Seventh Circuit ruled against the band's appeal to restore the original reservation boundaries.

According to the U.S. Census Bureau, the Stockbridge-Munsee Reservation in 2020 was 24.03 square miles (62.2 km^{2}). The tribe also administered 3.17 square miles (8.2 km^{2}) of off-reservation trust land. The combined reservation and off-reservation trust land have a total area of 27.25 sq mi (70.6 km^{2}), of which 27.2 sq mi (70 km^{2}) is land and 0.05 sq mi (0.13 km^{2}) is water.

As of the census of 2020, the combined population of Stockbridge Munsee Community and Off-Reservation Trust Land was 733. The population density was 26.9 inhabitants per square mile (10.4/km^{2}). There were 321 housing units at an average density of 11.8 per square mile (4.6/km^{2}). The racial makeup of the reservation and off-reservation trust land was 78.0% Native American, 11.2% White, 0.1% Black or African American, 0.1% from other races, and 10.5% from two or more races. Ethnically, the population was 2.9% Hispanic or Latino of any race.

According to the American Community Survey estimates for 2016-2020, the median income for a household (including the reservation and off-reservation trust land) was $46,250, and the median income for a family was $54,500. Male full-time workers had a median income of $45,290 versus $39,519 for female workers. The per capita income was $21,293. About 13.6% of families and 18.6% of the population were below the poverty line, including 32.1% of those under age 18 and 7.3% of those age 65 or over. Of the population age 25 and over, 84.6% were high school graduates or higher and 11.5% had a bachelor's degree or higher.

== Land issues and claims ==
The Stockbridge–Munsee have continued to negotiate with local and state governments over land and tax issues. For instance, in 2012 they were working with the Tribal Affairs Committee of Shawano County on issues related to the potential impact of their converting purchased land to trust lands. They thought they had reached agreement to pay the towns and county $140,000 annually for ten years in exchange for the county's support for their land-to-trust deals in Red Springs or Bartelme, which had been part of the reservation in the 1850s. While the committee had reached agreement with the tribe, the County Board did not approve the deal.

In the late twentieth century, the Stockbridge–Munsee were among tribes filing land claims against New York, which had been ruled to have unconstitutionally acquired land from Native Americans in the post-American Revolutionary War years without United States Senate ratification. The Stockbridge–Munsee filed a land claim against New York state for 23,000 acres in Madison County, the location of its former homelands.

In November 2010, the outgoing New York governor David Paterson announced having reached a deal with the tribe. They would be given nearly 2 acres in Madison County and give up their larger claim in exchange for the state's giving them 330 acres of land in Sullivan County in the Catskill Mountains, where the government was trying to encourage economic development. The federal government had agreed to take the land in trust, making it eligible for development as a gaming casino, and the state would allow gaming, an increasingly important source of revenue for American Indians. The state believed this would help stimulate other development in the region. Race track and casinos, private interests and other federally recognized tribes opposed the deal.

The state in 2013 passed legislation to license four gaming casinos in three regions as a spur to economic development, and to keep revenues in the state that some residents were spending at other casinos. The Albany-Saratoga area, the Southern Tier-Finger Lakes region, and the Catskills and mid-Hudson River Valley were designated for resort gaming facilities and the state accepted proposals. Learning that several groups were bidding on an Orange County, New York site (this county was added to the legislation) located closer to New York, the Stockbridge–Munsee and their developer withdrew their bid in June 2014. They are investigating other uses of the property. Sullivan County, which had previously supported their plan, was also concerned that a casino in Orange County could siphon off too much business, as it is closer to the metropolitan New York market.

That year New York approved three resort casino licenses, with a fourth proposal under review in the Southern Tier. The new casinos were expected to open in 2017.

=== Other land claims cases ===
The tribe was unsuccessful in another land claims case. A case filed in 1986 against New York and the Oneida Nation was dismissed on June 21, 2014, by the 2nd Circuit Court of Appeals. It has also dismissed other tribal claims since the US Supreme Court decision in City of Sherrill v. Oneida Indian Nation of New York (2005). In a unanimous decision, the court said that the tribe had taken too long to press its land claim and could not recover land lost in 'early American history.' It ruled:

[I]t is now well‐established that Indian land claims asserted generations after an alleged dispossession are inherently disruptive of state and local governance and the settled expectations of current landowners, and are subject to dismissal on the basis of laches, acquiescence, and impossibility," the decision stated.

In this case, the tribe was suing the state of New York and the Oneida Nation; the court ruled that the Oneida were protected by sovereign immunity.

While the tribe discussed appealing the case to the US Supreme Court, analysts believe it is unlikely the court will hear it. The US Supreme Court has declined to hear appeals of similar land claims from the Oneida Nation, the Cayuga Nation and Onondaga Nation.

The doctrine invented to deny these claims is known as "new laches" or "Indian law laches" and has been widely condemned by law review articles.

=== Massachusetts ===
The Stockbridge Munsee also successfully reacquired a 350 acre farm and mountain side in the Berkshires in August, 2023 part of which is in Stockbridge.

== In popular culture ==
- The West Wing episode "The Indians in the Lobby" features the Stockbridge–Munsee Community.

== Notable tribal citizens ==
- Don Coyhis (born August 16, 1943), addiction specialist, Native American health activist and author. He won the 2009 Purpose Prize for establishing the Wellbriety Movement to help Native Americans recover from drug and alcohol dependence.
- Dorothy Davids (1923-2014) educator and Native American rights activist
- Brent Michael Davids (b. 1959), composer/flautist
- Robert L. Hall (1927–2012), anthropologist, archaeologist, author, and professor
- Jimmy Johnson (1899–1942), College Football Hall of Fame quarterback and dentist
- Bill Miller (born 1955), musician

== See also ==
- Stockbridge, Massachusetts, a town in which ancestors of the Stockbridge Mohicans once lived. Their traditional territory was along the Hudson River Valley, particularly on the east side.
- List of federally recognized tribal governments of Lenape
  - Delaware First Nation of Six Nations, Ontario (member of the Haudenosaunee Confederacy)
  - Delaware Nation, Oklahoma
  - Delaware Nation at Moraviantown, Ontario
  - Delaware Tribe of Indians, Oklahoma
  - Munsee-Delaware Nation, Ontario
  - Stockbridge-Munsee Community, Wisconsin (Partially Lenape, also Mohican)
