= Delaware Nation at Moraviantown =

Moravian 47 Eelūnaapèewii Lahkèewiit
- Indian reserve
- Moravian Indian Reserve No. 47
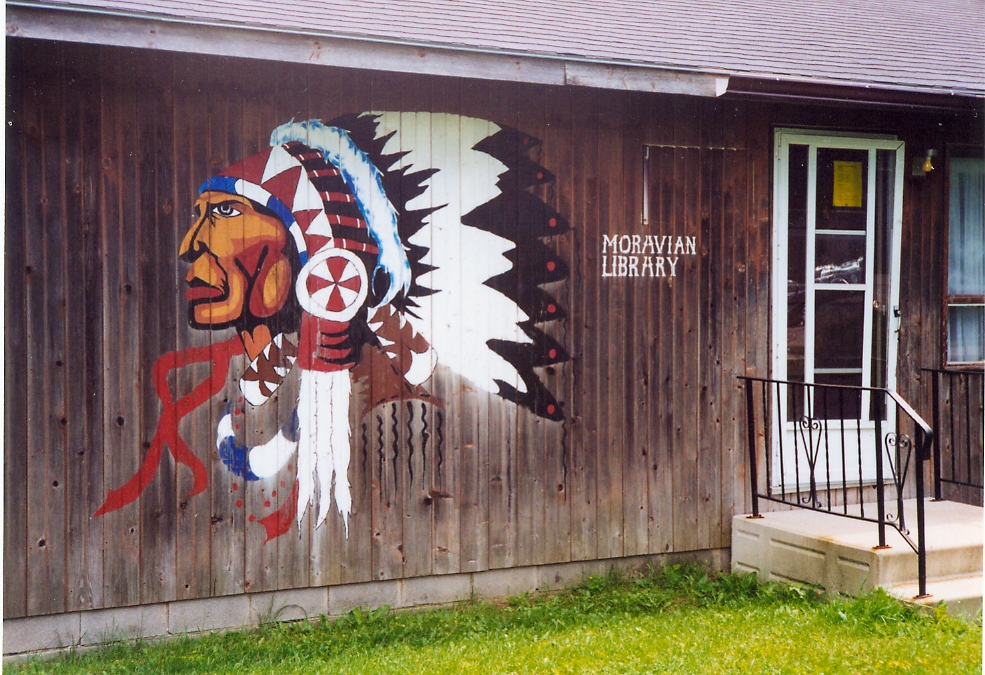

- Location within Municipality of Chatham-Kent Location within Southern Ontario
- Coordinates: 42°34′N 81°53′W
- Country: Canada
- Province: Ontario
- Municipality: Chatham-Kent
- First Nation: Delaware Nation at Moraviantown

Area
  - Land: 12.61 km^{2} (4.87 sq mi)

Population (2011)
  - Total: 404
  - Density: 32/km^{2} (83/sq mi)
- Website: delawarenation.on.ca

Moravian 47 (Munsee: Náahii, literally 'downstream', in contrast with Munsee-Delaware Nation, referred to as "Nalahii", meaning "upstream") is an Indian reserve located in Chatham-Kent, Ontario, with an area of 13 square kilometres (5.0 sq mi). It is occupied by the Delaware Nation at Moraviantown First Nation (Delaware: Eelūnaapèewii Lahkèewiit), a part of the Christian Munsee branch of the Lenape, and is commonly known as Moravian of the Thames reserve. The resident registered population is 457, with another 587 band members living off the reserve.

A group of Munsee was converted to Christianity by missionaries of the Moravian Church in Pennsylvania; these persons and their descendants are known as the Christian Munsee. They moved to Ohio Country, under pressure from European settlers in the east. Vibrant Moravian Christian Indian settlements were established in Schoenbrunn, Gnadenhutten, Salem, Petquotting and Goshen. After many of those in Gnadenhutten and Salem were murdered by American colonial militia in the Gnadenhutten massacre of the Moravian Christian Indian Martyrs on 8 March 1782 during the American Revolutionary War, the remaining Christian Munsee in Ohio gathered in Sandusky and led by Moravian missionary David Zeisberger, departed towards the Thames River. They eventually reestablished their Christian Indian community in what is today southern Ontario. At first temporarily settling near present-day Amherstburg, Ontario, in 1792, Zeisberger obtained permission from the British colonial authorities for the community to inhabit a site on the Thames River, near where it is located today.

During the War of 1812 between Great Britain and the United States, the Battle of the Thames took place near the community. The Shawnee leader Tecumseh, an ally of the United Kingdom, was killed by invading United States forces. Following the battle, before the US cavalry left the area, it burned the entire Christian Munsee community to the ground. They rebuilt on the south side of the Thames in their present location.

In 1903, the Moravian Christians transferred the Christian Munsee mission in Moraviantown to Methodist Christians, a denomination that eventually joined the United Church of Canada, the United Protestant denomination to which the Christian Munsee in Moraviantown belong to today.

== See also ==
- Delaware languages
- Six Nations of the Grand River First Nation
- List of federally recognized tribal governments of Lenape
  - Delaware First Nation of Six Nations, Ontario (member of the Haudenosaunee Confederacy)
  - Delaware Nation, Oklahoma
  - Delaware Nation at Moraviantown, Ontario (Christian Munsee)
  - Delaware Tribe of Indians, Oklahoma
  - Munsee-Delaware Nation, Ontario
  - Stockbridge-Munsee Community, Wisconsin (Partially Lenape, also Mohican)
