= Munsee (disambiguation) =

The Munsee are a subtribe of the Lenape.

Munsee may also refer to:

- Munsee-Delaware Nation, a Lenape First Nation in southwest Ontario, Canada
  - Munsee-Delaware Nation Indian Reserve No. 1, part of the above
- Munsee grammar
- Munsee language
- Christian Munsee
- Stockbridge-Munsee Community
- USS Munsee (ATF-107), an Abnaki-class fleet ocean tug

== See also ==
- Muncie (disambiguation)
- Muncey, surname
- Muncy (disambiguation)
- Munsey (disambiguation)
- Mansi (disambiguation)
- Minsi (disambiguation)
