= Munsey =

Munsey may refer to:

== People ==
- Bret Munsey (born 1968), American football coach
- Frank Munsey (1854–1925), American publisher
- George Munsey (born 1993), Scottish cricketer
- Nelson Munsey (1948–2009), American football player
- Stan E. Munsey (born 1955), American songwriter and keyboardist

== Other uses ==
- Munsey's Magazine
- Munsey Park, New York, a village in Nassau County
- Munsey Trust Building, Washington DC

== See also ==
- Muncie (disambiguation)
- Muncey, surname
- Muncy (disambiguation)
- Munsee (disambiguation)
- Mansi (disambiguation)
- Minsi (disambiguation)
