= Old Norse morphology =

Aspect of the language

Old Norse has three categories of verbs (strong, weak, & present-preterite) and two categories of nouns (strong, weak). Conjugation and declension are carried out by a mix of inflection and two nonconcatenative morphological processes: umlaut, a backness-based alteration to the root vowel; and ablaut, a replacement of the root vowel, in verbs.

Nouns, adjectives and pronouns are declined in four grammatical cases – nominative, accusative, genitive and dative, in singular and plural. Some pronouns (first and second person) have dual number in addition to singular and plural. The nouns have three grammatical genders – masculine, feminine or neuter - and adjectives and pronouns are declined to match the gender of nouns. The genitive is used partitively, and quite often in compounds and kennings (e.g.: Urðarbrunnr, the well of Urðr; Lokasenna, the gibing of Loki). Most declensions (of nouns and pronouns) use -a as a regular genitive plural ending, and all declensions use -um as their dative plural ending.

All neuter words have identical nominative and accusative forms, and all feminine words have identical nominative and accusative plurals.

The gender of some words' plurals does not agree with that of their singulars, such as lim and mund. (Note: Cleasby & Vigfússon 1874, p.389, LIM; p.437, MUD)

== Morphophonology ==
Conditioned sound changes can cause some forms of a word to mismatch, or match in some words but not others. When speakers can't determine these conditions, but the effects remain, they are re-analyzed by speakers as rules for changing sounds during inflection, the morphophonology of the language. In this way, the history of a language affects its speakers.

=== During Proto-Germanic ===
Verner's law shifted Proto-Germanic /*h/ > /*g/ after an unstressed syllable. Afterwards, stress shifted to the first syllable in all words. In many Old Norse verbs, a lost /g/ reappears in the forms of some verbs, which makes their morphology abnormal, but remain regular because the forms containing /g/s are the same for each verb they appear in.

ex.: Proto-Germanic *slōhúm > *slōgúm (we struck) had an unstressed first syllable, but the corresponding singular, *slṓh (I struck), had only a stressed syllable. These became Old Norse slógum and sló.^{:1}

=== Before Old Norse ===
Umlaut was originally an assimilation of root vowels to suffixes having the front phonemes /i, j/ (i-umlaut) and the back phonemes /u, w/ (u-umlaut) in Proto-Germanic. The suffixes were not on all forms of the same words, so when the suffixes underwent syncope during the transition into Old Norse, the remaining umlaut of the vowel indicated what the suffix had before. From then on speakers would alternate the vowel as an act of inflection.

== Verbs ==
Verbs are conjugated in person and number, in present and past tense, in indicative mood, imperative, and subjunctive mood. There are elements of repetition and minor variation in the inflections, but the type of verb also determines which patterns are present. The subjunctives show the largest and widest spread pattern among the inflections, with both strong and weak classes ending subjunctives (past and present) with ek/þú/þat -a/-ir/-i, vér/þér/þau -im/-ið/-i, except for a minor variation in the 3rd, 4th and 5th strong conjugations.

The active participle is used to form a gerund or a verbal noun (Note: Cleasby & Vigfússon 1874, p. xxxii) with weak masculine singulars but strong masculine plurals in r, or else with weak neuter declension. As a plain participle, it is a weak adjective. (Note: Cleasby & Vigfússon 1874, p.xx "Remarks on the Weak Declension") The participle appears in two genders within the same verse in Hávamál: "gínanda úlfi / galandi kráku." The general sense of the noun is of the English suffix -er or of being able to perform the action. (Note: Cleasby & Vigfússon 1874, p. xxxiii) The plural as a prefix, ęndr-, is equivalent to the English and Latin prefix re-.

The case of the object of an Old Norse verb is lexically assigned, meaning that the case is determined on a per-verb basis. Most verbs take an accusative object, but some, such as gefa (give) have primary and secondary objects in the accusative and dative, while still others have nominative, genitive, or dative direct objects.

=== Strong verbs ===
Strong verbs, unlike weak verbs, are conjugated by ablaut, a process that replaces, rather than modifies, their root vowel. The English sing uses ablaut to conjugate to sang in the past tense and sung as the past participle. Like weak verbs, strong verbs use inflections and umlaut, but they rely on them much less to distinguish forms and conjugations. While the strongs' umlaut and inflectional patterns are largely the same from verb to verb, there are different sets and numbers of vowels involved in ablaut, and so their patterns are used to classify the strong conjugations.

If there are 2 vowels in the pattern (as in the 6th & some 7th conjugation patterns), the 2nd is used for all the past forms. If there are 3, the 2nd vowel is used for the indicative past singulars, & the 3rd for the other past tenses. The 1st vowel is used for the remaining forms: the infinitive, present forms, and imperative, and usually the past participle of 3-vowel words. However, some 3-vowel words have a 4th vowel appearing only in the participle.

The past participle of strong verbs follows the pronominal declension of hit, (Note: Cleasby & Vigfússon 1874, p.xix, "Assimilation/Dropping"; p.xx, "Comparison, Definiteness") though unlike the definite suffix the participle is inherited from Proto-Germanic.

1st: í, ei, i, i/e 2nd: ú/jú/jó, au, u, (o)		rísa (í, ei, i, i) (rise)						bjóða (jó, au, u, o) (bid)					
1st: í, ei, i, i/e 2nd: ú/jú/jó, au, u, (o)		Inf	rís-a	Imp	rís	Pr P	rís-andi	Inf	bjóð-a	Imp	bjóð	Pr P	bjóð-andi
1st: í, ei, i, i/e 2nd: ú/jú/jó, au, u, (o)		Pa P						Pa P					
1st: í, ei, i, i/e 2nd: ú/jú/jó, au, u, (o)		N	ris-it	M	ris-inn	F	ris-in	N	boð-it	M	boð-inn	F	boð-in
1st: í, ei, i, i/e 2nd: ú/jú/jó, au, u, (o)		ek	þú	þat	vér	þér	þau	ek	þú	þat	vér	þér	þau
Pr T	Ind	rís	rís-s		rís-um	rís-ið	rís-a	býð	býð-r		bjóð-um	bjóð-ið	bjóð-a
Pr T	Subj	rís-a	rís-ir	rís-i	rís-im	rís-ið	rís-i	bjóð-a	bjóð-ir	bjóð-i	bjóð-im	bjóð-ið	bjóð-i
Pa T	Ind	reis	reis-t	reis	ris-um	ris-uð	ris-u	bauð	baut-t	bauð	buð-um	buð-uð	buð-u
Pa T	Subj	ris-a	ris-ir	ris-i	ris-im	ris-ið	ris-i	byð-a	byð-ir	byð-i	byð-im	byð-ið	byð-i

The 3rd, 4th and 5th conjugations have an i, rather than an a, in the 1st person subjunctive past ending. Third conjugation words ending in n, g, or k have a u for their past participles' root vowel. The jas of the 3rd conjugation are due to breaking. The 4th and 5th conjugations are identical except in the past participle, where the 4th conjugation normally has o and the fifth conjugation e. Generally, 3rd conjugation stems have two consonants following the vowel; 4th conjugation stems have a single sonorant consonant (l, r, m or n) following the vowel; and 5th conjugation stems have a single consonant that is not a sonorant.

3rd: i/e/ja, a, u, (u/o) 4th: e/o, a, á, (u/o/ó) 5th: e/i, a, á, (e)		brenna (e, a, u, u) (burn)						bera (e, a, á, o) (bear/carry)						gefa (e, a, á, e) (give)					
3rd: i/e/ja, a, u, (u/o) 4th: e/o, a, á, (u/o/ó) 5th: e/i, a, á, (e)		Inf	brenn-a	Imp	brenn	Pr P	brenn-andi	Inf	ber-a	Imp	ber	Pr P	ber-andi	Inf	gef-a	Imp	gef	Pr P	gef-andi
3rd: i/e/ja, a, u, (u/o) 4th: e/o, a, á, (u/o/ó) 5th: e/i, a, á, (e)		Pa P						Pa P						Pa P					
3rd: i/e/ja, a, u, (u/o) 4th: e/o, a, á, (u/o/ó) 5th: e/i, a, á, (e)		N	brunn-it	M	brunn-inn	F	brunn-in	N	bor-it	M	bor-inn	F	bor-in	N	gef-it	M	gef-inn	F	gef-in
3rd: i/e/ja, a, u, (u/o) 4th: e/o, a, á, (u/o/ó) 5th: e/i, a, á, (e)		ek	þú	þat	vér	þér	þau	ek	þú	þat	vér	þér	þau	ek	þú	þat	vér	þér	þau
Pr T	Ind	brenn	brenn-r		brenn-um	brenn-ið	brenn-a	ber	ber-r		ber-um	ber-ið	ber-a	gef	gef-r		gef-um	gef-ið	gef-a
Pr T	Subj	brenn-a	brenn-ir	brenn-i	brenn-im	brenn-ið	brenn-i	ber-a	ber-ir	ber-i	ber-im	ber-ið	ber-i	gef-a	gef-ir	gef-i	gef-im	gef-ið	gef-i
Pa T	Ind	brann	brann-t	brann	brunn-um	brunn-uð	brunn-u	bar	bar-t	bar	bár-um	bár-uð	bár-u	gaf	gaf-t	gaf	gáf-um	gáf-uð	gáf-u
Pa T	Subj	brynn-i	brynn-ir	brynn-i	brynn-im	brynn-ið	brynn-i	bær-i	bær-ir	bær-i	bær-im	bær-ið	bær-i	gæf-i	gæf-ir	gæf-i	gæf-im	gæf-ið	gæf-i

The 6th conjugation is cognate with English's take/took/taken conjugation. The 7th conjugation is a heterogenous category. Its ablaut patterns include a/á, e/é; au, jó; a, jó, jo; and ý, jó, ú.

6th: a, ó 7th: Various		fara (a, ó) (go)						gráta (á, é) (weep)					
6th: a, ó 7th: Various		Inf	far-a	Imp	far	Pr P	far-andi	Inf	grát-a	Imp	grát	Pr P	grát-andi
6th: a, ó 7th: Various		Pa P						Pa P					
6th: a, ó 7th: Various		N	far-it	M	far-inn	F	far-in	N	grát-it	M	grát-inn	F	grát-in
6th: a, ó 7th: Various		ek	þú	þat	vér	þér	þau	ek	þú	þat	vér	þér	þau
Pr T	Ind	fęr	fęr-r		fǫr-um	far-ið	far-a	græt	græt-r		grát-um	grát-ið	grát-a
Pr T	Subj	far-a	far-ir	far-i	far-im	far-ið	far-i	grát-a	grát-ir	grát-i	grát-im	grát-ið	grát-i
Pa T	Ind	fór	fór-t	fór	fór-um	fór-uð	fór-u	grét	grét-st	grét	grét-um	grét-uð	grét-u
Pa T	Subj	fœr-a	fœr-ir	fœr-i	fœr-im	fœr-ið	fœr-i	grét-a	grét-ir	grét-i	grét-im	grét-ið	grét-i

==== Verbs in -ra ====
The -ra conjugation consists of strong verbs with weak preterites that use an r rather than a dental in their inflection. These arose as contractions of reduplicated verbs. They correspond to modern Icelandic ri-verbs. When the pre-contraction form of the verb contained a velar, it persisted in the past indicative plurals, past subjunctives, and past participle, and the verb assumed the characteristics (ablaut, inflection) of normal strong conjugation. Alternate, regularized past-tenses for these were also in use in some dialects, with an -ø-r or -e-r format. (Note: Cleasby & Vigfússon 1874, pp.566-7, Slá) Verbs like kjósa and snúa follow the ú/jú/jó, au, u, (o) ablaut pattern, and verbs like slá follow the a, ó ablaut. (Note: Cleasby & Vigfússon 1874, pp.xxv-xxvi, "3: The Verbs with the Preterite in -ra")

-ra		snúa (turn) (Note: Cleasby & Vigfússon 1874, p.576, Snúa forms: Snúa, þeir snöri; p.340, Kjósa, ek kjöra, kjörit/keyrit (alt. kosit), keyrinn (alt. kosinn); p.174 Frjósa, frjósanda; p.207, GNÚA, quote: "at þú sitir mjótt ok gnúir saman lærum þínum")					
-ra		Inf	snú-a	Imp	snú, snúðú	Pr P	snú-andi
-ra		Pa P					
-ra		N	snú-it, snør-it	M	snú-inn snør-inn	F	snú-in snør-in
-ra		ek	þú	þat	vér	þér	þau
Pr T	Ind	sný	sný-r, snýrðu	sný-r	snú-m	snú-ið	snú-a
Pr T	Subj	snú-a	snú-ir	snú-i	snú-im	snú-ið	snú-i
Pa T	Ind	snø-ra	snø-rir	snø-ri	snø-rum	snø-ruð	snø-ru
Pa T	Subj	snø-ra	snø-rir	snø-ri	snø-rim	snø-rið	snø-ri

The forms of slá without the g have absorbed said consonant, lengthening the vowel in the process. When this process is taken into account, the conjugation can be seen as that of a regular verb with an a, ó ablaut pattern. The -ø-r past tense forms were used in some dialects, with sløri and sløru as attested forms, but was rare in writing.

-ra: Velar stem		slá (a, ó) (strike, slay) (Note: Cleasby & Vigfússon 1874, Slá forms: Outlines of Grammar - p.xl, rýja-svimma; p.751, Þvá, þógum, þógut; p.159, Flá, flegin)					
-ra: Velar stem		Inf	slá	Imp	slá, sláðú	Pr P	slá-ndi
-ra: Velar stem		Pa P					
-ra: Velar stem		N	slęg-it	M	slęg-inn	F	slęg-in
-ra: Velar stem		ek	þú	þat	vér	þér	þau
Pr T	Ind	slæ	slæ-r		slá-(u)m	slá-ið	slá
Pr T	Subj	slá	slá-ir	slá-i	slá-im	slá-ið	slá-i
Pa T	Ind	sló	sló-(tt-(ú))	sló	slóg-um	slóg-uð	slóg-u
Pa T	Subj	slœg-a	slœg-ir	slœg-i	slœg-im	slœg-ið	slœg-i

=== Weak verbs ===
Weak verbs distinguish the tenses of the indicative and subjunctive primarily by adding a suffix with a dental (t, d, or ð). This is the primary mode of distinction of tenses, in contrast with the radical vowel changes characteristic of the strong verbs. Preceded by the dental, the subjunctive past tense endings take the form of their present tense endings, changing the inflectional vowel to i in the plural. The indicative forms take the subjunctive forms, changing the inflectional vowel to u in the plural. The dental is preceded by an a in some verbs, causing the past tenses to become trisyllabic.

There are three primary conjugations, corresponding approximately to the first three classes of weak verbs in Gothic. The Proto-Germanic and Gothic Class IV weak verb, with a *-n(ō)- suffix, has been incorporated into the second conjugation in Old Norse.

==== First conjugation ====
The first weak conjugation has an -i/j- suffix, which triggers i-umlaut of the stem. As in other Germanic languages, there are two subclasses, depending on whether the stem is short (consisting of a short vowel followed by at most one consonant) or long (containing a long vowel or diphthong, or followed by two or more consonants). The differences are due to Sievers' law, which caused the suffix to assume the form *-j- after short syllables but *-ij- after long syllables. The long *-ij- suffix subsequently disappeared when followed by a vowel that remained in Old Norse (except after k, g or a vowel, as in fylgja "to follow"), but betrays its former presence by i-umlauting the stem syllable. (Note: Cleasby & Vigfússon 1874, p.xxiv, "Weak Verbs, Remarks on the 2nd Conjugation)

When the stem was directly followed by a consonant, it was vocalized, becoming *-i- after short syllables and *-ī- after long syllables. Short *-i- was lost early on in many circumstances, before the operation of i-umlaut; as a result, short-stem verbs lack i-umlaut in the indicative past and the past participle. Umlaut does occur in the subjunctive past of the short-stem verbs, either as a result of the -j/ī- that originally occurred in the subjunctive endings or by analogy with the strong verbs. (Contrast Gothic, where the -i- stem is still preserved, and Old English, where i-umlaut operated early enough that all first-weak verbs, both short and long, have consistent i-umlaut throughout the paradigm.)

Many 1st conjugation verbs are derived by i-umlaut of the second ablaut form of a strong verb, often serving as a causal equivalent to it. (This derives directly from the Proto-Indo-European causative-iterative construction.) For example, bręnna — to make burn derives from brenna/brinna (ek brann, þau brunnu) — to burn; be burning. The -ing & -ingr suffixes are added to a finite form of some of these verbs to derive feminine and masculine nouns from them. The -ning & -ningr can also be used to derive feminine and masculine nouns in short-stem verbs, and are added to a non-umlauted form of the verbs, e.g. spurning "a question" from spyrja "to ask".

===== Short-stem verbs =====
3rd: suppressed i		glęðja (ða, ðr) (gladden)						spyrja (ða, ðr) (ask)					
3rd: suppressed i		Inf	glęð-ja	Imp	glęð	Pr P	glęð-jandi	Inf	spyr-ja	Imp	spyr	Pr P	spyr-jandi
3rd: suppressed i		Pa P						Pa P					
3rd: suppressed i		N	glat-t	M	glad-dr	F	glǫd-d	N	spur-t	M	spur-ðr	F	spur-ð
3rd: suppressed i		ek	þú	þat	vér	þér	þau	ek	þú	þat	vér	þér	þau
Pr T	Ind	glęð	glęð-r		glęð-jum	glęð-ið	glęð-ja	spyr	spyr-r		spyr-jum	spyr-ið	spyr-ja
Pr T	Subj	glęð-ja	glęð-ir	glęð-i	glęð-im	glęð-ið	glęð-i	spyr-ja	spyr-ir	spyr-i	spyr-im	spyr-ið	spyr-i
Pa T	Ind	glad-da	glad-dir	glad-di	glǫd-dum	glǫd-duð	glǫd-du	spur-ða	spur-ðir	spur-ði	spur-ðum	spur-ðuð	spur-ðu
Pa T	Subj	ględ-da	ględ-dir	ględ-di	ględ-dim	ględ-dið	ględ-di	spyr-ða	spyr-ðir	spyr-ði	spyr-ðim	spyr-ðið	spyr-ði

===== Long-stem verbs =====
2nd: i		dœma (da, dr) (judge)						fylgja (ða, t) (follow)					
2nd: i		Inf	dœm-a	Imp	dœm	Pr P	dœm-andi	Inf	fylg-ja	Imp	fylg	Pr P	fylg-jandi
2nd: i		Pa P						Pa P					
2nd: i		N	dœm-t	M	dœm-dr	F	dœm-d	N	fylg-t				
2nd: i		ek	þú	þat	vér	þér	þau	ek	þú	þat	vér	þér	þau
Pr T	Ind	dœm-i	dœm-ir		dœm-um	dœm-ið	dœm-a	fylg-i	fylg-ir		fylg-jum	fylg-ið	fylg-ja
Pr T	Subj	dœm-a	dœm-ir	dœm-i	dœm-im	dœm-ið	dœm-i	fylg-ja	fylg-ir	fylg-i	fylg-im	fylg-ið	fylg-i
Pa T	Ind	dœm-da	dœm-dir	dœm-di	dœm-dum	dœm-duð	dœm-du	fylg-ða	fylg-ðir	fylg-ði	fylg-ðum	fylg-ðuð	fylg-ðu
Pa T	Subj	dœm-da	dœm-dir	dœm-di	dœm-dim	dœm-dið	dœm-di	fylg-ða	fylg-ðir	fylg-ði	fylg-ðim	fylg-ðið	fylg-ði

==== Second conjugation ====
The second conjugation is marked by a consistent -a- suffix, with no i-umlaut. It contains a class of derivates with characteristic suffixes: inchoatives in -na, such as vakna; causals in -ga from adjectives in -igr; causals in -ka; iteratives in -sa; verbs in -la, a kind of diminutive; and verbs in -ja, -va, and -ra. (Note: Cleasby & Vigfússon 1874, p.xxiv, "Weak Verbs, Remarks on the 1st Conjugation) The -n suffix is applied to the infinitive of some of these verbs to derive feminine nouns from them. The inflections containing ǫð (see table) may spell and pronounce the ǫ as a reduced u or an a depending on the dialect.

1st: a		boða (að) (bode)						kalla (að) (call)					
1st: a		Inf	boð-a	Imp	boð-a	Pr P	boð-andi	Inf	kall-a	Imp	kall-a	Pr P	kall-andi
1st: a		Pa P						Pa P					
1st: a		N	boð-at	M	boð-aðr	F	boð-ǫð	N	kall-at	M	kall-aðr	F	kǫll-ǫð
1st: a		ek	þú	þat	vér	þér	þau	ek	þú	þat	vér	þér	þau
Pr T	Ind	boð-a	boð-ar		boð-um	boð -ið (-it)	boð-a	kall-a	kall-ar		kǫll-um	kall-ið	kall-a
Pr T	Subj	boð-a	boð-ir	boð-i	boð-im	boð -ið (-it)	boð-i	kall-a	kall-ir	kall-i	kall-im	kall-ið	kall-i
Pa T	Ind	boð-aða	boð-aðir	boð-aði	boð-ǫðum	boð-ǫðuð	boð-ǫðu	kall-aða	kall-aðir	kall-aði	kǫll-ǫðum	kǫll-ǫðuð	kǫll-ǫðu
Pa T	Subj	boð-aða	boð-aðir	boð-aði	boð-aðim	boð-aðið	boð-aði	kall-aða	kall-aðir	kall-aði	kall-aðim	kall-aðið	kall-aði

==== Third conjugation ====
The third conjugation is generally marked by an -i- in the present tense, and no suffix in the past tense. This -i- does not trigger i-umlaut, as it derives from Proto-Germanic *-ai-. However, subjunctive preterites do have i-umlaut, either as a result of the *-j/ī- that originally occurred in the subjunctive endings or by analogy with the strong verbs.

4th: i		vaka (ta, at) (be awake)						duga (ða, at) (help)					
4th: i		Inf	Imp	Pr P	Pa P			Inf	Imp	Pr P	Pa P		
4th: i		vak-a	vak(-i)	vak-andi	N	vak-at		dug-a	dug(-i)	dug-andi	N	dug-at	
4th: i		ek	þú	þat	vér	þér	þau	ek	þú	þat	vér	þér	þau
Pr T	Ind	vak-i	vak-ir		vǫk-um	vak-ið	vak-a	dug-i	dug-ir		dug-um	dug-ið	dug-a
Pr T	Subj	vak-a	vak-ir	vak-i	vak-im	vak-ið	vak-i	dug-a	dug-ir	dug-i	dug-im	dug-ið	dug-i
Pa T	Ind	vak-ta	vak-tir	vak-ti	vǫk-tum	vǫk-tuð	vǫk-tu	dug-ða	dug-ðir	dug-ði	dug-ðum	dug-ðuð	dug-ðu
Pa T	Subj	vęk-ta	vęk-tir	vęk-ti	vęk-tim	vęk-tið	vęk-ti	dyg-ða	dyg-ðir	dyg-ði	dyg-ðim	dyg-ðið	dyg-ði

=== Present-preterite verbs ===
Present-preterite, or present-in-past, verbs form their present tenses using the ablaut patterns of strong verbs' past tenses. Their past tenses are formed like weak verbs'.

		The Verb Substantive vera (e, a, á, e) (be)					
		Inf	ve(r/s)-a	Pr P	ver-andi	Pa P N	ver-it
		ek	þú	þat	vér	þér	þau
Imper		ver	ver-tu	ver	verit		
Pr T	Ind	em	e(r/s)-t	e(r/s)	er-um	er-uð	er-u
Pr T	Subj	sjá/sé	sé-r	sé	sé-m	sé-ð	sé
Pa T	Ind	va(r/s)	va(r/s)-t	va(r/s)	vár-um	vár-uð	vár-u
Pa T	Subj	vær-a	vær-ir	vær-i	vær-im	vær-ið	vær-i

Ten verbs with Present in Preterite form.
INDIC.	Pres.	Sing.	1.	á	kná	má	skal	kann	mun (mon)	man	þarf	ann	veit
INDIC.	Pres.	Sing.	2.	á-tt	kná-tt	má-tt	skal-t	kann-t	mun-t	man-t	þarf-t	ann-t	veiz-t
INDIC.	Pres.	Sing.	3.	á	kná	má	skal	kann	mun	man	þarf	ann	veit
INDIC.	Pres.	Plur.	1.	eig-um	kneg-um	meg-um	skul-um	kunn-um	mun-um	mun-um	þurf-um	unn-um	vit-um
INDIC.	Pres.	Plur.	2.	eig-uð	kneg-uð	meg-uð	skul-uð	kunn-uð	mun-uð	mun-ið	þurf-ið	unn-ið	vit-uð
INDIC.	Pres.	Plur.	3.	eig-u	kneg-u	meg-u	skul-u	kunn-u	mun-u	mun-a	þurf-a	unn-a	vit-u
INDIC.	Pret.	Sing.	1.	á-tta	kná-tta	má-tta		kunn-a	mun-da	mun-da	þurf-ta	unn-a	vis-sa
				as regular weak verbs									
IMPERAT.				eig				kunn		mun		unn	vit
SUBJ.	Pres.	Sing.	1.	eig-a	kneg-a	meg-a	skyl-a	kunn-a	myn-a	mun-a	þurf-a	unn-a	vit-a
				as regular weak verbs									
	Pret.	Sing.	1.	ætt-a	knætt-a	mætt-a	skyl-da	kynn-a	myn-da	myn-da	þyrf-ta	ynn-a	vis-sa
				as regular weak verbs									
INFIN.	Pres.			eig-a		meg-a	skyl-u	kunn-a	mun-u	mun-a	þurf-a	unn-a	vit-a
INFIN.	Pret.				knáttu		skyl-du		mun-du				
PART.	Act.			eig-andi		meg-andi		kunn-andi		mun-andi	þurf-andi	unn-andi	vit-andi
PART.	Pass.	Neut.		á-tt		má-tt		kunn-at		mun-at	þurf-t	unn-(a)t	vit-at

=== Suffixes and clitics ===
The reflexive pronoun's accusative, sik, is contracted and suffixed to the verb as -k, -sk, or -zk in order to form the reflexive suffix. This suffix is often referred to as Old Norse's "middle voice." In the early 13th century, the suffixes became -z and -s, and later -zt and -zst. As a middle voice, it can be thought of as passivizing an action without using passive voice syntax. This usage of reflexivity is paralleled in English with sentence pairs such as "he sat down" and "he sat himself down."

		Reflexive/reciprocal suffix or middle voice										
		On a Weak Verb: kalla (að) (call)/ (Note: Cleasby & Vigfússon 1874, p.xxiii, "Verbs §C.-E.")						On a Strong Verb: láta (let)				
		ek	þú	þat	vér	þér	þau	ek/þú/þat		vér	þér	þau
Pr T	Ind	kǫllu-mk/ kalla-sk	kalla-sk		kǫllu-m(s)k	kalli-sk	kalla-sk	læzk		látu-mk	láti-zk	láta-sk
Pr T	Subj	kǫllu-mk/ kalli-sk	kalli-sk		kalli-m(s)k	kalli-(s/z)k	kalli-sk	láti-sk		láti-mk	láti-zk	láti-sk
Pa T	Ind	kǫlluðu-mk/ kallaði-sk	kall(i/a)ði-sk	kallaði-sk	kǫlluðu-m(s)k	kǫlluðu-(s/z)k	kǫlluðu-sk	lézk		létu-mk	létu-zk	létu-sk
Pa T	Subj	kǫlluðu-mk/ kallaði-sk	kallaði-sk		kallaði-m(s)k	kallaði-(s/z)k	kallaði-sk	léti-sk		léti-mk	léti-zk	léti-sk
Pa P	N	kalla-zk						Pa P	N	láti-zk		

Verbs with the Negative Suffix.
			Pres.	Pret.	Pres.	Pret.	Pres.	Pret.	Pres.	Pret.	Pres.	Pret.
INDIC.	Sing.	1.	em-k-at	var-k-at(vas-k-at)	skal-k-at	skylda-g-a	mon-k-a	munda-g-a	hyk-k-at	hugða-g-a	á-k-at	átta-g-a
INDIC.	Sing.	2.	ert-at-tu	vart-at-tu	skalt-at-tu	skyldir-a	mont-at-tu	mundir-a	hyggr-at	hugðir-a	átt-at-tu	áttir-a
INDIC.	Sing.	3.	er-at (es-at)	var-at (vas-at)	skal-at	skyldi-t	mon-at	mundi-t	hyggr-at	hugði-t	á-t	átti-t
INDIC.	Plur.	3.	eru-t	váru-t	skulu-t	skyldu-t	monu-t	mundi-t	hyggja-t	hugðu-t	eigu-t	áttu-t
IMPERAT.			ver-at-tu (be not thou!), lát-at-tu (let not thou!), grát-at-tu (weep not thou!), etc.									

== Nouns ==
Old Norse and other Germanic languages had two types of regular declension. They are called the strong and weak declensions by analogy with the strong and weak conjugations. These declensions are further subdivided into stem classes: groups of nouns distinguished by the historical or present morphophonological characteristics that the nouns of each class's stems share(d). Their names take after their Proto-Germanic or Proto-Indo-European ancestors, and refer to the suffixes present on those older nouns. Because umlaut was caused by these suffixes, there is a strong correlation between the phonetic characteristics of the suffix and the type of umlaut seen among stems of a class. Besides the latter classification, the stems may be grouped into the root noun, consonant stem, and vocalic stem declensions, in Proto-Germanic terms.

In Proto-Germanic, the neuter stems modeled their nominative/accusative singulars after masculine accusative singulars, while their nominative/accusative plurals were modeled after the nominative singular of the corresponding feminine declension.

=== Strong nouns ===
Old Norse has 2 strong neuter declensions, and 3 strong masculine and feminine declensions. The masculine and feminine declensions may be referred to as the a, i, and r declensions, after their nominative plural inflections of -ar, -ir, and -r, respectively.

Though the a-declension masculines tend towards a genitive -s, and the i- and r-declension words towards -ar, many words are found going against the norm. Grautr, skógr, and hǫfundr, for example, are a-declension nouns with -ar for a genitive singular. The -i of the dative singular is frequently dropped from many words, particularly in the i-declension. Bisyllabic proper names in -arr (Einarr) or -urr (Gizurr) do not contract as hamarr does before an inflectional syllable, due to differing etymologies. The following words demonstrate two PIE o-stem reflexes, one bisyllabic, a yo-stem reflex, and an iyo-stem reflex. The latter stem type consists mainly of poetic words. (Note: Cleasby & Vigfússon 1874, pp. xvi–xviii)

Masculine a declension
	armr (arm)		hamarr (hammer)		hęrr (a people) (Note: Cleasby & Vigfússon 1874, p.258, Hęrr)		hęllir (cave)	
Case	Singular	Plural	Singular	Plural	Singular	Plural	Singular	Plural
Nominative	arm-r	arm-ar	hamar-r	hamr-ar	hęr-r	hęr-jar	hęll-ir	hęll-ar
Accusative	arm	arm-a	hamar	hamra	hęr	hęr-ja	hęll-i	hęll-a
Genitive	arm-s	arm-a	hamar-s	hamra	hęr-jar	hęr-ja	hęll-is	hęll-a
Dative	arm-i	ǫrm-um	hamr-i	hǫmr-um	hęr-i	hęr-jum	hęll-i	hęll-um

Among the i-declension masculines are the wa-stem reflexes. These have a u-umlauted root caused by a radical v.

The strong feminines descend from PIE ā stems. PIE -ā developed into PGmc. -ō and finally Proto-Norse -u, leading to the singulars of these words being u-umlauted under that inflection's influence. Their plurals are the same as those of the analogous masculine declension, except for the nominative and accusative being the same. The ending -ir of the i-stems, as in tíð - tíðir, while not exemplified in the table below, is in fact more common in feminines than the ending of ō-stems -ar, and has become increasingly so by analogy; thus the example gjǫf in the table in later texts replaces its old plural form gjafar with gjafir. A dative singular u inflection is found in some nouns, most noticeably in the i-declension where it is sometimes accompanied by an accusative singular u. Some nouns, prominently among nouns in the same declension as ęrmr, carry a nominative singular r inflection; surprisingly, these are the descendants of the Proto-Germanic ijō-stems (i.e. long jō-stems, as opposed to the short counterpart seen below in the example Hęl), which historically lacked that ending; it seems that they have acquired it through confusion with the i-stems such as tíð, which did originally have it. Conversely, the i-stems have lost the nominative -r ending through analogy with ō-stem feminines. Finally, many nouns do not have any inflectional distinctions among the singulars except from the genitive. Under these circumstances the case system aligns with that of most English nouns, e.g.: "A mouse's (G) mouse (N) gave a mouse (A) to a mouse (D)." or Latin neuter u-stems (with the additional ablative and vocative cases also being identical). e.g.: "Cornūs (G) cornū (N), quod cornū (D) ērat, cornū (Ac) cum cornū (Ab) frēgit. Cornū (V)!" ("A horn's horn, that belonged to a horn, broke a horn with a horn. O horn!")

Feminine ō declension
	gjǫf (gift)		Hęl		ęrmr (arm/sleeve)		ǫr (arrow)	
Case	Singular	Plural	Singular	Plural	Singular	Plural	Singular	Plural
Nominative	gjǫf	gjaf-ar	Hęl	Hęl-jar	ęrm-r	ęrm-ar	ǫr	ǫr-var
Accusative	gjǫf	gjaf-ar	Hęl	Hęl-jar	ęrm-i	ęrm-ar	ǫr	ǫr-var
Genitive	gjaf-ar	gjaf-a	Hęl-jar	Hęl-ja	ęrm-ar	ęrm-a	ǫr-var	ǫr-va
Dative	gjǫf	gjǫf-um	Hęl-ju	Hęl-jum	ęrm-i	ęrm-um	ǫr-u	ǫr-um

The neuter declensions' genitive and dative mirror the masculine a declension's. The nom./acc. plural is u-umlauted from the singulars, but this only alters nouns with a as their root, leaving number indistinct in many strong neuters for these cases. PGmc -ja stem reflexes, such as nęs and klæði, are umlauted without regard to stem weight.

Neuters with masculine a singulars
	barn (baby)		nęs (ness)		klæði (cloth)		ríki (power)	
Case	Singular	Plural	Singular	Plural	Singular	Plural	Singular	Plural
Nom. & Acc.	barn	bǫrn	nęs		klæði		ríki	
Genitive	barn-s	barn-a	nęs-s	nęsi-a	klæði-s	klæð-a	ríki-s	ríki-a
Dative	barn-i	bǫrn-um	nęsi	nęsi-um	klæði	klæð-um	ríki	ríki-um

Neuters with masculine i singulars
	tré (tree) (Note: Cleasby & Vigfússon 1874, p. 639, "Tré")		hǫgg (strike)	
Case	Singular	Plural	Singular	Plural
Nom. & Acc.	tré		hǫgg	
Genitive	tré-s	trjá	hǫgg-s	hǫggv-a
Dative	tré	trjá-m	hǫggv-i	hǫgg-um

=== Weak nouns ===
One main feature of weak nouns is that they do not distinguish the non-nominative singular cases from each other. This effectively forms a nominative-oblique case dynamic confined to the weak singulars. Historically, the Proto-Germanic weak nouns were characterized by a nasal suffix applied as a case marker. These were mostly absorbed by their preceding vowels by the time Old Norse developed, with the main exceptions being those suffixes in the weak feminine and neuter declensions' genitive plurals. (Note: Cleasby & Vigfússon 1874, p.xviii, "Weak Nouns: 1: Masculine") As a result, weak nouns are referred to as the n stems, a consonant stem class.

The plural inflection of the weak masculine declension is that same as the strong masculine a declension. The weak declension contains the endings -ingi and -yrki/-virki, as well as some weak versions of strong masculine nouns, names, and endings.

Masculines in -i
	bogi (bow)		bandingi (prisoner)	
Case	Singular	Plural	Singular	Plural
Nominative	bog-i	bog-ar	band-ing-i	band-ing-jar
Accusative	bog-a	bog-a	band-ing-ja	band-ing-ja
Genitive	bog-a	bog-a	band-ing-ja	band-ing-ja
Dative	bog-a	bog-um	band-ing-ja	bǫnd-ing-jum

The weak feminines with the -a ending vary greatly in the genitive plural, but most fall into a few groups: Nouns with -na as ending; nouns with no genitive plural; nouns that form the genitive plural by attaching the definite article's genitive plural to the nominative singular; nouns whose genitive singular is used collectively. (Note: Cleasby & Vigfússon 1874, p.xviii, "Weak Nouns: 2: Feminine")

Feminines in -a
	varta (wart)		saga (story)		gyðja (goddess)	
Case	Singular	Plural	Singular	Plural	Singular	Plural
Nominative	vart-a	vǫrt-ur	sag-a	sǫg-ur	gyði-a	gyði-ur
Accusative	vǫrt-u	vǫrt-ur	sǫg-u	sǫg-ur	gyði-u	gyði-ur
Genitive	vǫrt-u	vart-na	sǫg-u	[*sag-(an)-na]	gyði-u	gyði-a-nna
Dative	vǫrt-u	vǫrt-um	sǫg-u	sǫg-um	gyði-u	gyði-um

As the nominative of neuter words is also the accusative, and as weak nouns have the same dative and genitive as accusative in the singulars, all of the singular forms are the same for the weak neuters. One subset of the neuter declension contains 6 nouns for parts of the body. Another contains words for objects, forming no genitive plural. (Note: Cleasby & Vigfússon 1874, p.xviii, "Weak Nouns: 4: Neuter")

Neuters in -a
	auga (eye)		síma (rope)	
Case	Singular	Plural	Singular	Plural
Nom. & Acc.	aug-a	aug-u	sím-a	sím-u
Genitive	aug-a	aug-na	sím-a	[*sím-na]
Dative	aug-a	aug-um	sím-a	sím-um

The Indeclinable Feminines are an additional class of weak noun which originally had a word stem with the ending -in of which in Old Norse only the -i remains. They are conceptual in meaning, and because of this have no plurals and do not differentiate case. (Note: Cleasby & Vigfússon 1874, p.xviii, "Weak Nouns: 3: Remarks on the Indeclinable Feminine") The word lygi "lie" however has a plural. They may, in charts, be included with the feminines in -a, in which case said chart becomes:

Indeclinable Feminines
	ævi (life)	gleði (happiness)
Case	Singular	Singular
N., A., D., & G.	æu-i	gleð-i

The word "lygi" (lie)
Case	Singular	Plural
Nom. & Acc.	lyg-i	lyg-ar
Genitive	lyg-i	lyg-a
Dative	lyg-i	lyg-um

== Pronouns and adjectives ==
Pronouns and adjectives are generally separate in declension. However, in semantic and syntactic usage, the boundary is less clear-cut. Adjectives may be used as in English, to modify a noun (e.g., gótt vatn, good water), or may stand alone as a de facto pronoun (e.g., gótt, a good thing). The only difference in their declensions is the masculine accusative singular ending, which is -n in pronouns and -an in adjectives. Genitive and dative plurals are indistinct in gender for all pronominal and adjectival declensions. The nominative and accusative neuter singular ends in -t when the word's root vowel is short, and -tt when long.

=== Pronouns ===
The interrogatives include hvat "what", hví "why", and hvess "what sort", derived from þat, hvar "where" and hveim "whom", derived from þar, hvárt "which of two, each," and hvęrt, "whether, which of many."

There are two relative particles, er or es and sem, which can also be used as relative pronouns or adverbs. Both are completely indeclinable. The former carries the relative (non-interrogative) senses of the words which, who, when, where, and that. The latter corresponds to as, as if, alike, same as, or about the same time as, and may take on any function of er as well.

Some pronouns, such as hvárr, hvęrt, nekkvęrt, (Note: Cleasby & Vigfússon 1874, p.452, "[...] but nekkvert, nokkvort, nokkurt (answering to hvert), as an adjective.") and sá, have adjectival function. This usage generally requires a different translation than their pronominal one.

==== Personal and possessive ====
Þat's singulars follow the pronominal declension irregularly, and with different lemmata for each gender. Its plurals follow the declension of the cardinal numbers irregularly, and are especially similar to tvau's forms. Variants of hánum include honum and hǫnum.

For the 1st and 2nd person, actions with one's self as an object simply use mik, þik, etc. For the 3rd person, a separate reflexive pronoun is used, which follows the declension of the 1st and 2nd personal pronouns' singulars.

Personal Pronouns
		1st	2nd	3rd rflx.	3rd		
Number	Case				Neuter	Masc.	Feminine
Singular	Nominative	ek	þú		þat	han-n	hón (hon)
Singular	Accusative	mik	þik	sik	þat	han-n	han-a
Singular	Genitive	mín	þín	sín	þess	han-s	hęn-nar
Singular	Dative	mér	þér	sér	því	hán-um	hęn-ni
Dual	Nominative	vit	(þ)it	As sing.	None*		
Dual	Accusative	okkr	ykkr	As sing.	None*		
Dual	Genitive	okkar	ykkar	As sing.	None*		
Dual	Dative	okkr	ykkr	As sing.	None*		
Plural	Nominative	vér	(þ)ér	As sing.	þau	þei-r	þæ-r
Plural	Accusative	oss	yðr	As sing.	þau	þá	þæ-r
Plural	Genitive	vár	yð(v)ar	As sing.	þei-rra		
Plural	Dative	oss	yðr	As sing.	þei-m		

* Tvau "two" or bœði "both" may be used as substitute for a true 3rd personal dual.

The possessive pronouns are derived from the genitives of the personal pronouns. They are mitt, þitt, sitt, okkart, ykkart, várt, and yðart. The í of those derived from the singulars is shortened before nn or tt.

Possessive Pronouns
		mitt (mín)			yð(v)art (yð(v)ar)			várt (vér)		
Number	Case	Neuter	Masc.	Feminine	Neuter	Masc.	Feminine	Neuter	Masc.	Feminine
Singular	Nominative	mi-tt	min-n	mín	yð(v)ar-t	yð(v)ar-r	yður	vár-t	vár-r	vár
Singular	Accusative	mi-tt	min-n	mín-a	yð(v)ar-t	yð(va)r-an	yð(va)r-a	vár-t	vár-(a)n	vár-a
Singular	Genitive	mín-s		min-nar	yð(v)ar-s		yð(var)-rar	vár-s		vár-rar
Singular	Dative	mín-u	mín-um	min-ni	yð(u)r-u	yð(u)r-um	yð(var)-ri	vár-u	vár-um	vár-ri
Plural	Nominative	mín	mín-ir	mín-ar	yður	yð(va)r-ir	yð(va)r-ar	vár	vár-ir	vár-ar
Plural	Accusative	mín	mín-a	mín-ar	yður	yð(va)r-a	yð(va)r-ar	vár	vár-a	vár-ar
Plural	Genitive	min-na			yð(v)ar-ra			vár-ra		
Plural	Dative	mín-um			yð(u)r-um			vár-um		

=== Adjectives ===
The comparative and superlative forms are formed by inserting -r- and -st- or -ar- and -ast- between the uninflected form of the adjective and a strong or weak ending. In the strong adjectives, the definite and superlative are strong when indefinite, weak when definite. The comparatives are weak when both definite and indefinite, and are declined like the active participle. Some strong adjectives i-umlaut their root vowel in their comparatives and superlatives, so that stórt hús (a large house) becomes stœrst (a house most large). The past participles of weak verbs decline as strong adjectives.

==== Hit ====
As the definite article, hit appears before a definite adjective and suffixed to a noun. (Note: Cleasby & Vigfússon 1874, pp.262-3 "Hit/hinn/hin") Double definiteness occurs when hit/hinn/hin or the other definite article, þat/sá/sú, is used before a definite noun or adjective, e.g. "sá konungrinn," "inn hvíti." This type of construction persists to some extent in all modern North Germanic languages, though not generally in Icelandic. When suffixed, it gives the nouns pronominal declension (like itself). The h is always dropped, and the root i is replaced by any vowel at the end of the noun. The early dative plural uminum is contracted to unum in West Norse, and umin in East Norse. In other uses, it can appear before an adverb, after a pronoun, between two nouns, or between an adjective and a pronoun (including another adjective).

The hit originally appeared always as a separate word, hit/hinn/hin, it/inn/in, or et/enn/en, placed before or after a noun or adjective, with the /h/ elided due to the word appearing unstressed in most or all positions. In the late 14th century (particularly in Old Norwegian), an indeclinable form was popular, inu or hinu, but at no other time.

A related word, hitt, should not be confused with hit, as they are distinct in meaning and stress, and in that the h can never be dropped from hitt. (Note: Cleasby & Vigfússon 1874, pp.263-4, "Hitt/hinn/hin")

Hit and -it suffix nouns
		hit (the)			hundrinn (the hound)	eyrat (the ear)
Number	Case	Neut.	Masc.	Fem.	Masc.	Neut.
Singular	Nominative	hi-t	hin-n	hin	hundr-inn	eyra-t
Singular	Accusative	hi-t	hin-n	hin-a	hund-inn	eyra-t
Singular	Genitive	hin-s		hin-nar	hunds-ins	eyra-ns
Singular	Dative	hin-u	hin-um	hin-ni	hundi-num	eyra-nu
Plural	Nominative	hin	hin-ir	hin-ar	hundar-nir	eyru-n
Plural	Accusative	hin	hin-a	hin-ar	hunda-na	eyru-n
Plural	Genitive	hin-na			hunda-nna	eyra-nna
Plural	Dative	hin-um			hundu-num, hundum-in	eyru-num, eyrum-in

=== Strong declension ===
Jarpt demonstrates the general case for declension. Gótt displays dental assimilation, while nekkvęrt demonstrates pronominal declension. The comparative and superlative follow the weak declension.

Strong Adjectival Declension
		jarpt (brown)			gótt (good)			nekkvęrt (indefinite pronoun)		
Number	Case	Neuter	Masculine	Feminine	Neuter	Masculine	Feminine	Neuter	Masculine	Feminine
Singular	Nominative	jarp-t	jarp-r	jǫrp	gót-t	góð-r	góð	nekkvęr-t	nekkvęr-r	nekkvęr
Singular	Accusative	jarp-t	jarp-an	jarp-a	gót-t	góð-an	góð-a	nekkvęr-t	nękkvęr-n	nekkvęr-a
Singular	Genitive	jarp-s		jarp-rar	góð-s		góð-rar	nekkvęr-s		nekkvęr-rar
Singular	Dative	jǫrp-u	jǫrp-um	jarp-ri	góð-u	góð-um	góð-ri	nekkvęr-u	nekkvęr-um	nekkvęr-ri
Plural	Nominative	jǫrp	jarp-ir	jarp-ar	góð	góð-ir	góð-ar	nekkvęr	nekkvęr-ir	nekkvęr-ar
Plural	Accusative	jǫrp	jarp-a	jarp-ar	góð	góð-a	góð-ar	nekkvęr	nekkvęr-a	nekkvęr-ar
Plural	Genitive	jarp-ra			góð-ra			nekkvęr-ra		
Plural	Dative	jǫrp-um			góð-um			nekkvęr-um		

=== Weak declension and weak inflection of active participles ===
The singulars of the weak adjectival declension are modelled after those of the weak noun declensions (-an- and -on-stems), and likewise have a nominative-oblique case dynamic.

The active participle and comparative only have a weak declension and are in masculine and neuter modelled after the weak nouns with roots in -an-stems, but in feminine and plural modelled after the weak nouns with roots in -in-stems. The comparative form as in Latin, other Germanic languages etc. is also corresponding to the agent noun-ending, which in Old Norse has a weak declension with roots in -an-stem inflection as well.

The plurals are not distinguished in gender, nor in case except the dative.

Weak Adjectival Declension
		þriðja (third)			Active participle			Comparative		
Number	Case	Neuter	Masculine	Feminine	Neuter	Masculine	Feminine	Neuter	Masculine	Feminine
Singular	Nominative	þriði-a	þrið-i	þriði-a	-and-a	-and-i	-and-i	-(a)r-a	-(a)r-i	-(a)r-i
Singular	A., G., & D.	þriði-a	þriði-a	þriði-u	-and-a	-and-a	-and-i	-(a)r-a	-(a)r-a	-(a)r-i
Plural	N., A., & G.	þriði-u			-and-i			-(a)r-i		
Plural	Dative	þriði-um			-ǫnd-um			-(ǫ)r-um		

=== Indeclinable ===
The indeclinable adjectives end in -i, -a or -s. They are not comparable. They originated either from regular weak adjectives, with the different endings marking gender; or adjectives with a noun ending in genitive plural or singular, as they originally were nouns.

=== Numbers ===
Eitt (one) follows the pronominal declension, and hundrað is a strong neuter noun.

Tvau, bæði, þrjú, and fjǫgur have only plural, and their declension is given below. The background of the inflection tveimr and þrimr in the dative case as seen below is the Proto-Germanic noun and adjective dative and instrumental plural ending -maz and -miz. Those endings are still used in contemporary Icelandic today. All other cardinal numbers are indeclinable.

The distributives and multiplicatives are all strong adjectives. The ordinals are weak, except for annat "the second", which is strong and fyrst "the first", which can be both.

Cardinal Numbers
	bæði (both)			tvau (two)			þrjú (three)			fjǫgur (four)		
Case	Neut.	Masc.	Fem.	Neut.	Masc.	Fem.	Neut.	Masc.	Fem.	Neut.	Masc.	Fem.
Nominative	bæð-i	báð-ir	báð-ar	tvau (tvǫ)	tvei-r	tvæ-r	þri-ú	þri-r	þri-ár	fjǫg-ur (fjug-ur)	fjór-ir	fjór-ar
Accusative	bæð-i	báð-a	báð-ar	tvau (tvǫ)	tvá	tvæ-r	þri-ú	þri-á	þri-ár	fjǫg-ur (fjug-ur)	fjór-a	fjór-ar
Genitive	bę-ggja			tvę-ggja			þri-ggja			fjǫg-urra		
Dative	báð-um			tvei-m (tvei-mr)			þri-m (þri-mr)			fjór-um		

== See also ==
- Old Norse
- Old Swedish Grammar
- Old Norwegian Grammar
- Old Danish Grammar
- Proto-Germanic grammar
