= Muncy =

Muncy may refer to:

== People ==
- Baron Muncy (c.1300), English peerage title held by Walter de Muncy
- Becky Muncy, American educator in Indiana
- Jeff Muncy, American television producer and toy designer
- Matt Muncy (born 1983), American former professional football player
- Max Muncy (born 1990), American professional baseball player
- Max Muncy (baseball, born 2002), American baseball player

== Places ==
In Pennsylvania

- Muncy, Pennsylvania, a borough in Lycoming County
- Muncy Creek Township, Lycoming County, Pennsylvania
- Muncy Township, Lycoming County, Pennsylvania
  - Muncy Historic District, located in Muncy Township
  - Muncy Junior-Senior High School, located in Muncy Township
  - Muncy School District, located in southern Lycoming County
- Muncy Valley, Pennsylvania, an unincorporated community in Sullivan County
- State Correctional Institution – Muncy

Elsewhere

- Muncy, Oklahoma, an unincorporated community in Texas County, Oklahoma
- Tylersville, Ohio, an unincorporated community previously known as Pug Muncy

== Events ==
- 1938 Muncy Raft crash
- Muncy Abolition riot of 1842

== Other ==
- Muncy (grape), another name for the Catawba grape
- Muncy Creek, a tributary of the West Branch Susquehanna River
  - Little Muncy Creek, a tributary of Muncy Creek
- State Correctional Institution – Muncy, a women's prison in Pennsylvania

== See also ==
- Muncey, surname
- Muncie (disambiguation)
- Munsee (disambiguation)
- Munsey (disambiguation)
- Mansi (disambiguation)
- Minsi (disambiguation)
