= Proto-Germanic grammar =

Linguistic reconstruction

Historical linguistics has made tentative postulations about and multiple varyingly different reconstructions of Proto-Germanic grammar, as inherited from Proto-Indo-European grammar. All reconstructed forms are marked with an asterisk (*).

== Overview ==
Proto-Germanic had six cases, three genders, two numbers (relics of dual survive in verbs and in some number words like 'two' or 'both'), three moods (indicative, subjunctive (PIE optative), imperative), and two voices (active and passive (PIE middle)). This is quite similar to the state of Latin, Greek, and Middle Indo-Aryan languages of c. 200 BCE. It is often asserted that the Germanic languages have a highly reduced system of inflections as compared with Greek, Latin, or Sanskrit. However, some parts of the inflectional systems of Greek, Latin, and Sanskrit were innovations that were not present in Proto-Indo-European.

Furthermore, it is probably due more to the late time of attestation of Germanic than to any inherent "simplicity" of the Germanic languages. As an example, there are fewer than 500 years between the Gothic Gospels of 360 CE (see Ulfilas) and the Old High German Tatian of 830 CE, yet Old High German, despite being the most archaic of the West Germanic languages, is missing a large number of archaic features present in Gothic, including dual and passive markings on verbs, reduplication in Class VII strong verb past tenses, the vocative case, and second-position (Wackernagel's Law) clitics. Many more archaic features may have been lost between the Proto-Germanic of 200 BCE or so and the attested Gothic language.

Furthermore, Proto-Romance and Middle Indo-Aryan of the fourth century CE – contemporaneous with Gothic – had significantly less inflexional complexity than Latin and Sanskrit, respectively, and overall features probably no more archaic than Gothic. At the same time, Middle Persian inflection had already been simplified to a stage perhaps comparable with modern Dutch.

== Nouns ==
The system of nominal declensions was largely inherited from PIE. Six cases were preserved: vocative, nominative, accusative, dative, instrumental, genitive. The instrumental and vocative can be reconstructed only in the singular. The instrumental survives only in the West Germanic languages, and the vocative only in Gothic. The locative case had merged into the dative case, and the ablative may have merged with either the genitive, dative or instrumental cases. However, sparse remnants of the earlier locative and ablative cases are visible in a few pronominal and adverbial forms, and in some instances the case forms of certain noun classes use the older locative ending for the dative.

The older distinction between athematic and thematic stems had been lost, and generally nouns were divided into several declension classes based on the vowels or consonants before the case endings. Globally, there were vowel stems (a-, ō-, i- and u-stems) and consonant stems (n-, r- and z-stems and stems ending in other consonants). Usually, only nouns ending in consonants other than n, r or z are called consonant stems in the context of Proto-Germanic nouns. The neuter nouns of all classes differed from the masculines and feminines in their nominative and accusative endings, which were alike.

=== a-stems ===
The a-stems descended from the PIE thematic inflection and were by far the most common type of noun in Proto-Germanic. Although they could originally be any gender in PIE (as could be seen in Latin), in Proto-Germanic they were restricted to either masculine (ending in -az) or neuter (ending in -ą). The two genders differed only in the nominative, vocative and accusative cases; the other three cases were identical for both. There were two smaller subgroups within the a-stems, ja-stems, and wa-stems. These were declined the same as regular a-stems, but with a suffix -(i)j- or -w- before the ending. It was only in the daughter languages that the wa- and (especially) ja-stems began to diverge significantly from the regular a-stems.

The Proto-Indo-European genitive & dative singular endings *-osyo and *-oey, alongside the instrumental plural -ōys have the reconstructed results of *-as/-is, -ai, and *-amiz instead of the more expected **-az (same as the nominative singular *-az) and **-ōj (compare the nominative plural *-ōz from -oes) and -**ōiz. The reason for this is unclear, but some theories have been put forward as to why.

The irregular genitive could be use of a stressed and/or e-grade variant (**-ósyo or **-ésyo), which would give *-as or *-is instead of a more expected *-az or hypothetical *-iz (from **-esyo) after the loss of world final *-a -o -e -ya -yo -ye -wa -wo -we, as *-s would remain voiceless due to the accent falling on the suffix and not the root word. The best explanation for this irregular stressed variant being used for the genitive was probably the speakers of Germanic wanting to keep the nominative/genitive opposition intact in some form, finding it a useful distinction to make in speech.

The i-stem dative singular *-eyes and instrumental plural *-imis probably influenced the development of the a-stem endings too, giving Early Pre-Germanic **-oye and **-omis, which would give *-ai, and *-amiz after regular *a o > a merging, unstressed raising of *e to i, Verner's law and loss of intervocalic *-y-. The exact reason for these specific endings to be irregularly changed in analogy with the i-stem forms is unknown.

For the nominative and vocative plural, the northern West Germanic languages attest a voiceless *-s in the ending also. The origin of this is not clear.

	*wulfaz ‘wolf’ (masc.)		*juką ‘yoke’ (neut.)	
	Singular	Plural	Singular	Plural
Nominative	*wulfaz	*wulfōz, -ōs	*juką	*jukō
Vocative	*wulf	*wulfōz, -ōs	*juką	*jukō
Accusative	*wulfą	*wulfanz	*juką	*jukō
Genitive	*wulfas, -is	*wulfǫ̂	*jukas, -is	*jukǫ̂
Dative	*wulfai	*wulfamaz	*jukai	*jukamaz
Instrumental	*wulfō	*wulfamiz	*jukō	*jukamiz

=== ō-stems ===
The ō-stems descended from the thematic eh₂-stems in PIE, but there were also examples that descended from originally neuter collective nouns that were reinterpreted as feminine singulars. They were the feminine equivalent of the a-stems and were the most common type of feminine noun, with a nominative singular ending in -ō. There were also jō-stems and wō-stems, declined identically to the regular ō-stems but with a suffix before the ending.

	*gebō ‘gift’ (fem.)	
	Singular	Plural
Nominative-Vocative	*gebō	*gebôz
Accusative	*gebǭ	*gebōz
Genitive	*gebōz	*gebǫ̂
Dative	*gebōi	*gebōmaz
Instrumental	*gebō	*gebōmiz

=== ī/jō-stems ===
The ī/jō-stems descended from athematic/ablauting nouns in *-ih₂/yéh₂-. In Proto-Germanic, they had almost fallen together with the jō-stems, except that they had a nominative/vocative singular form in -ī rather than -jō. They did not survive as a distinct class in any language except possibly Gothic.

	*bandī ‘fetter, bond’ (fem.)	
	Singular	Plural
Nominative-Vocative	*bandī	*bandijôz
Accusative	*bandijǭ	*bandijōz
Genitive	*bandijōz	*bandijǫ̂
Dative	*bandijōi	*bandijōmaz
Instrumental	*bandijō	*bandijōmiz

=== i-stems ===
The i-stems descended from PIE nouns in -is, many of which were feminine abstract nouns in -tis. They were reasonably common and appeared in all three genders, although neuter i-stems were very rare with only a handful of reconstructible examples. The masculine and feminine i-stems were declined the same, with a nominative singular in -iz. The neuters ended in -i.

	*gastiz ‘guest’ (masc.)		*mari ‘sea’ (neut.)	
	Singular	Plural	Singular	Plural
Nominative	*gastiz	*gastīz	*mari	*marī
Vocative	*gasti	*gastīz	*mari	*marī
Accusative	*gastį	*gastinz	*mari	*marī
Genitive	*gastīz	*gastijǫ̂	*marīz	*marjǫ̂
Dative	*gastī	*gastimaz	*marī	*marimaz
Instrumental	*gastī	*gastimiz	*marī	*marimiz

=== u-stems ===
The u-stems descended from PIE nouns in -us, many of which were masculine nouns in -tus. They were formally parallel to the i-stems, but because of sound changes they had become a distinct class. They were less common than the i-stems overall and appeared in all three genders, although neuter u-stems were likewise very rare. The masculine and feminine u-stems were declined the same, with a nominative singular in -uz. The neuters ended in -u, but since there are no neuter plurals attested, their plural inflection can only be guessed.

	*sunuz ‘son’ (masc.)		*fehu ‘livestock’ (neut.)	
	Singular	Plural	Singular	Plural
Nominative	*sunuz	*suniwiz	*fehu	(*-ū?)
Vocative	*sunu	*suniwiz	*fehu	(*-ū?)
Accusative	*sunų	*sununz	*fehu	(*-ū?)
Genitive	*sunauz	*suniwǫ̂	*fehauz	(*-iwǫ̂?)
Dative	*suniwi	*sunumaz	*fihiwi	(*-umaz?)
Instrumental	*sunū	*sunumiz	*fehū	(*-umiz?)

=== an-stems ===
The an-stems were a common group of noun, descended from various kinds of PIE n-stem, all of which were athematic. They were either masculine or neuter, although neuters were rare. Their nominative singular forms ended in -ô. There were also jan-stems and wan-stems, which were declined mostly as regular an-stems. The an-stems correspond with Latin 3rd declension nouns such as homō (gen. hominis) "man" and nomen (gen. nominis) "name". They are also the source of many modern German weak nouns.

The masculine nominative singular ending cannot be reconstructed with confidence, as both North and East Germanic reflect a rather different ending. Old Norse -i and Gothic -a can conceivably come from an ending *-ē, but the source of such an ending is unknown. Kroonen also disputes the genitive singular ending, having the ending terminate in -az instead of -iz; for the sake of relevance, the -az genitive ending termination will be used in discussing declensions of zero-grade–ablauting an-stems in this article.

	*gumô? ‘man’ (masc.)		*augô? ‘eye’ (neut.)	
	Singular	Plural	Singular	Plural
Nominative	*gumô?	*gumaniz	*augô?	*augōnō
Vocative	*gumô?	*gumaniz	*augô?	*augōnō
Accusative	*gumanų	*gumanunz	*augô?	*augōnō
Genitive	*guminiz	*gumanǫ̂	*auginiz	*auganǫ̂
Dative	*gumini	*gumammaz	*augini	*augammaz
Instrumental	*guminē?	*gumammiz	*auginē?	*augammiz

Some nouns, such as *namô "name", preserved an alternate ablaut pattern, with the suffix in the zero grade in some forms.

	*namô? ‘name’ (neut.)	
	Singular	Plural
Nominative-Vocative-Accusative	*namô?	*namnō
Genitive	*naminiz	*namnǫ̂
Dative	*namini	*namnamaz
Instrumental	*naminē?	*namnamiz

Under the controversial Kluge's Law, a paradigmatic n in an an-stem immediately succeeding a stop consonant may fuse to create a geminate stop, in the same context as Verner's Law, seen most prominently in the genitive singular. The dative singular of ablauting an-stems would also be affected by Verner's law itself, causing the voicing of an originally voiceless root-final consonant. This voiceless geminate may then be reduced to a single voiceless stop after a heavy syllable. Furthermore, some an-stems contained root ablaut across their paradigms. All these morphophonological alternations would create multiple stems for a single noun's declension paradigm. The descendants of these ablauting an-stems in the daughter languages were derived from one morpohonological alternant generalized across a paradigm; paradigmatically leveled derivatives would be generally derived from the nominative singular stem, genitive singular stem, dative singular stem, accusative plural stem, or some chimera of these.

Kroonen reconstructs the following masculine an-stems incorporating Kluge's Law (of which he is an ardent supporter) and usually assuming the amphikinetic accent pattern.

	*krebô? ‘basket’		*skinkô? ‘shank’	
	Singular	Plural	Singular	Plural
Nominative-Vocative	*krebô?	*krebaniz	*skinkô?	*skinkaniz
Accusative	*krebanų	*kurpunz	*skinkanų	*skankunz
Genitive	*kurpaz	*kurpǫ̂	*skunkaz	*skunkǫ̂
Dative	*krebini	*krebummaz	*skungini	*skungummaz
Instrumental	*kurpē?	*krebummiz	*skunkē?	*skungammiz

One zero-grade–ablauting an-stem in particular, *hrīmô ("hoarfrost"), would thus gain a uniquely irregular declension of its own, due to a combination of Kluge's law alternations, post–heavy-syllable geminate shortening, and the loss of an original root-final f in several forms, such as the nominative singular. This left the word with a nominative singular of *hrīmô and a genitive singular of *hrīpaz.

=== ōn-stems ===
The ōn-stems were an innovated formation, created by attaching n-stem endings to older feminines in -ō. They were likewise always feminine, and acted as the feminine counterpart of the an-stems. They probably ended in -ǭ, but that is not certain. There were also jōn-stems and wōn-stems, declined identical to regular ōn-stems.

	*tungǭ? ‘tongue’ (fem.)	
	Singular	Plural
Nominative-Vocative	*tungǭ?	*tungōniz
Accusative	*tungōnų	*tungōnunz
Genitive	*tungōniz	*tungōnǫ̂
Dative	*tungōni	*tungōmaz
Instrumental	*tungōnē?	*tungōmiz

Kroonen additionally reconstructs a single root-ablauting ōn-stem noun, *bijǭ ("bee") (which he reconstructs as *bīō in his published work), which he states to have an oblique stem in *bin-.

=== īn-stems ===
This group of nouns contained only a single type of abstract noun, formed by attaching an īn-suffix to adjectives. They were always feminine, and were essentially identical to ōn-stems, with ī replacing ō in all the forms. The nominative singular ended presumably in -į̄.

=== r-stems ===
The r-stem inflection type was limited to just 7 words. Their inflection was somewhat unusual, but generally resembled other consonant stem nouns. 6 of them were close kinship terms, *fadēr ‘father’, *mōdēr ‘mother’, *brōþēr ‘brother’, *swestēr ‘sister’, *duhtēr ‘daughter’ and *þeuhtēr ‘descendant, grandson’. The only word non-kinship related word to use this inflection was *aihtēr ‘owner, possessor’, from *aiganą 'to own, to possess', which was borrowed into Proto-Samic as *ājttrë, and also took on the additional meaning of ‘caretaker’ as well. Whilst the first 5 terms were preserved almost universally in modern Germanic languages (albeit being reassigned new inflection types by the middle of the millennium in all) the terms *þeuhtēr (attested in Middle High German tiehter, diehter) and *aihtēr (only attested in the Old Swedish compound iorþattari ‘landowner’) fell into obsolescence early on.

	*brōþēr ‘brother’ (mas.)	
	Singular	Plural
Nominative-Vocative	*brōþēr	*brōþriz?
Accusative	*brōþerų	*brōþrunz
Genitive	*brōþurz	*brōþrǫ̂
Dative	*brōþri	*brōþrumaz
Instrumental	*brōþrē?	*brōþrumiz

=== z-stems ===
The z-stems descended from PIE acrostatic neuters in -os/es-. They were fairly rare and always neuter. They were formed similarly to an-stems, but with z replacing n. Their nominative singular forms ended in -az.

	*lambaz ‘lamb’ (neut.)	
	Singular	Plural
Nominative-Vocative-Accusative	*lambaz	*lambizō
Genitive	*lambiziz	*lambizǫ̂
Dative	*lambizi	*lambizumaz
Instrumental	*lambizē?	*lambizumiz

=== Root nouns and other consonant stems ===
Nouns in this group are usually just called 'consonant stems'. It was mostly a class of remnants, consisting of PIE root nouns (nouns with no suffix) and nouns with a suffix ending in a consonant other than n, r or z. There are few reconstructible neuters; those that can be reconstructed were irregular. It is possible that many reconstructible a-stem neuters originally belonged to this class, however.

The nominative singular cannot be reliably reconstructed. Purely etymologically, *-s would be expected, or perhaps *-z after a voiced consonant. However, it is likely that the final consonant cluster would have undergone simplification, as it did in other Indo-European languages such as Latin. This is not attested in any Germanic language, so this remains speculative.

	*fōts? ‘foot’ (masc.)	
	Singular	Plural
Nominative	*fōts?	*fōtiz
Vocative	*fōt?	*fōtiz
Accusative	*fōtų	*fōtunz
Genitive	*fōtiz	*fōtǫ̂
Dative	*fōti	*fōtumaz
Instrumental	*fōtē?	*fōtumiz

There were several irregular nouns in this class. The most prominent are *tanþs ‘tooth’ and *wrōts ‘root’, which preserved ablaut and Verner alternation in the root. The noun *mili ‘honey’, one of the few reconstructible neuters, had lost its stem-final -t but kept it as -d- in the oblique cases. The nominative singular of the noun *mann- ‘human, man’ has so far not been conclusively reconstructed.

	*tanþs ‘tooth’ (masc.)		*wrōts ‘root’ (fem.)		*mili ‘honey’ (neut.)	*mann- ‘human, man’ (masc.)	
	Singular	Plural	Singular	Plural	Singular	Singular	Plural
Nominative	*tanþs?	*tanþiz	*wrōts?	*wrōtiz	*mili	*man(n)ô / *man(n)z	*manniz
Vocative	*tanþ?	*tanþiz	*wrōt?	*wrōtiz	*mili	*mann?	*manniz
Accusative	*tanþų	*tanþunz	*wrōtų	*wrōtunz	*mili	*mannų	*mannunz
Genitive	*tundiz	*tundǫ̂	*wurtiz	*wurtǫ̂	*milidiz	*manniz	*mannǫ̂
Dative	*tundi	*tundumaz	*wurti	*wurtumaz	*milidi	*manni	*mannumaz
Instrumental	*tundē?	*tundumiz	*wurtē?	*wurtumiz	*milidē?	*mannē?	*mannumiz

== Adjectives, determiners and pronouns ==
Adjectives, determiners and pronouns agreed with the noun they qualified in case, number, and gender, although without a separate vocative form. Their inflection stemmed from the PIE "pronominal inflection", which is used most prominently by the demonstrative pronoun in other Indo-European languages. Like the nouns, they had various declension classes, but the classes were less distinct. Globally, a distinction can be made between a/ō-stems (the vast majority), ja/jō-, i-, and u-stems (which were declined almost identically) and n-stem or "weak" adjectives.

A unique feature of Germanic adjectives was the distinction between strong and weak declensions, originally with indefinite and definite meaning, respectively. As a result of its definite meaning, the weak form came to be used in the daughter languages in conjunction with demonstratives and definite articles. This traditional account of the development and functioning of the dual adjective inflection system is largely assumption based. The evidence of variation in Gothic suggests that weak forms of adjectives can also be indefinite. This, in turn, suggests that the traditional account of the development of the Germanic strong vs. weak system of adjective inflection may be incorrect. The terms "strong" and "weak" are based on the later development of these declensions in languages such as German and Old English, where the strong declensions have more distinct endings. In the proto-language, as in Gothic, such terms have no relevance. The strong declension was the declension of the original adjective, with some significant pronominal admixture in the adjective inflection, while the weak declension was formed by replacing the adjective's own declension with n-stem endings identical to those of n-stem nouns.

=== Strong declension - a/ō-stems ===
These were by far the most common type of adjective, and even in the oldest languages (except Gothic) there was a tendency for all adjectives to be declined alike. The adjective *gōdaz "good" is given here as an example.

	Singular			Plural		
	Masculine	Neuter	Feminine	Masculine	Neuter	Feminine
Nominative	*gōdaz	*gōda	*gōdō	*gōdai	*gōdō	*gōdôz
Accusative	*gōdanǭ	*gōda	*gōdǭ	*gōdanz	*gōdō	*gōdôz
Genitive	*gōdas		*gōdaizōz	*gōdaizǫ̂		
Dative	*gōdammai		*gōdaizōi	*gōdaimaz		
Instrumental	*gōdana?		*gōdaizō	*gōdaimiz		

=== Strong declension - ja/jō-, i- and u-stems ===
Although these three classes were originally different, sound changes had made them largely identical in the feminine forms. Only the nominative singular differed: it was -jō for the ja/jō-stems, but -ī for the i- and u-stems. The masculine and neuter forms are uncertain, but may have been identical to the ja-stem adjectives already by analogy with the feminines (as they are in Gothic). Only the nominative singular forms remained distinct, the masculines ending in -jaz, -iz, -uz and the neuters in -ja, -i, -u.

=== Strong declension - present participles ===
The inflection of present participles in -nd- is likewise difficult to reconstruct. The feminines inflected as i- and u-stems, ending in -ī in the nominative singular but -jō- in the other forms. The masculines and neuters may have already acquired ja-stem endings, but it is certain that the nominative ended in -ndz or -nds.

=== Weak declension ===
This declension class was not a separate class of adjectives. Rather, adjectives could sometimes take this declension instead of their own strong declension. The weak declension was identical to the an-stem and ōn-stem declensions of nouns. Comparatives and ordinals used an alternative variety of the weak inflection, in which the feminine forms were not those of the ōn-stem nouns but of the īn-stems.

=== Third-person pronouns ===
Proto-Germanic had a demonstrative *sa ‘that, those’ which could serve as both a demonstrative determiner and a demonstrative pronoun. In daughter languages, it evolved into the definite article and various other demonstratives.

	Singular			Plural		
	Masculine	Neuter	Feminine	Masculine	Neuter	Feminine
Nominative	*sa	*þat	*sō	*þai	*þō	*þôz
Accusative	*þanǭ	*þat	*þǭ	*þanz	*þō	*þôz
Genitive	*þas		*þaizōz	*þaizǫ̂		
Dative	*þammai		*þaizōi	*þaimaz		
Instrumental	*þana?		*þaizō	*þaimiz		

Proto-Germanic possessed a general anaphoric pronoun *iz ‘he, she, it, etc.’ that was used as a third-person personal pronoun. It was inflected as follows:

	Singular			Plural		
	Masculine	Neuter	Feminine	Masculine	Neuter	Feminine
Nominative	*iz	*it	*sī	*īz	*ijō	*ijôz
Accusative	*inǭ	*it	*ijǭ	*inz	*ijō	*ijôz
Genitive	*es		*ezōz	*ezǫ̂		
Dative	*immai		*ezōi	*imaz		
Instrumental	*ina?		*ezō	*imiz		

The interrogative pronoun *hwaz ‘who, what’ was inflected likewise, but without plural forms. The feminine forms were probably rarely used, only if the person or thing being asked about was known to be feminine.

	Masculine	Neuter	Feminine
Nominative	*hwaz, *hwiz	*hwat	*hwō
Accusative	*hwanǭ	*hwat	*hwǭ
Genitive	*hwes, *hwas		*hwezōz
Dative	*hwammai		*hwezōi
Instrumental	*hwē, *hwī		*hwezō

There were several other pronouns and determiners in use, such as *jainaz ‘yon, that over there’, *aljaz ‘other’ and *allaz ‘all’. These were declined as strong adjectives, usually with no weak form. The proximal demonstrative *hiz ‘this’ was inflected as *iz. Neither pronoun survived in Old Norse, both survive in Gothic, and the two were eventually conflated in West Germanic, with the northern languages using the forms with h- (as English he) and the southern languages those without (German er). The Old Norse formation of the masculine and feminine singular pronouns is not fully understood, but appears to go back to a form *hanaz.

=== First- and second-person pronouns ===
The inflection of the first- and second-person pronouns was very different from any other kind of nominal, with case forms that did not match those of other nominals. As in Proto-Indo-European, the case system was markedly reduced - only four cases were distinguished. The dative and instrumental were identical, and the nominative was used as a vocative as well. The paradigms were suppletive, with different roots for the singular and dual/plural, and also with different roots for the nominative and non-nominative.

Unique within Germanic was that the pronouns of the first and second person retained distinct dual forms, which referred specifically to two individuals. Verbs also retained distinct dual forms in the first and second person, which agreed with the pronouns. The dual was lost in other nominals, and therefore the third-person dual of verbs was lost as well since verb–subject agreement was no longer possible. Although the dual pronouns survived into all the oldest languages, the verbal dual survived only into Gothic, and the (presumed) nominal and adjectival dual forms were lost before the oldest records. As in the Italic languages, it may have been lost before Proto-Germanic became a different branch at all.

Proto-Germanic personal pronouns
	First person			Second person		
	Singular	Dual	Plural	Singular	Dual	Plural
Nominative	*ek *ik^{1}	*wet *wit^{1}	*wīz *wiz^{1}	*þū	*jut	*jūz
Accusative	*mek *mik^{1}	*unk	*uns	*þek *þik^{1}	*inkw	*izwiz
Genitive	*mīnaz	*unkeraz	*unseraz	*þīnaz	*inkweraz	*izweraz
Dative/instrumental	*miz	*unkiz	*unsiz	*þiz	*inkwiz	*izwiz

^{1} – Unstressed variant

The genitive forms of the first and second person pronouns were inflected as strong adjectives, unlike other genitive forms which were uninflected.

== Verbs ==
Proto-Germanic had only two tenses (past and present). The present tense descended from the original PIE present imperfective, although there were a few verbs with a present tense that descended from the aorist, in some cases even the aorist subjunctive (which for athematic verbs was identical to the thematic present). The past tense of underived verbs descended from the PIE perfect. The only surviving PIE past imperfective was the past tense of "do". This verb formed the basis of the formation of a new past tense for derived verbs, which had no perfect forms of their own.

Compared to the six or seven tenses in Greek, Latin, and Sanskrit, the verb system of Proto-Germanic was markedly reduced. Some of this difference is due to deflexion, featured by a loss of tenses present in Proto-Indo-European, for example the perfect. However, many of the tenses of the other languages (future, future perfect, probably pluperfect, perhaps imperfect) appear to be separate innovations in each of these languages, and were not present in Proto-Indo-European.

The main area where the Germanic inflectional system is noticeably reduced is the tense system of the verbs, with only two tenses, present and past. However:

- Later Germanic languages (for instance Modern English) have a more elaborated tense system, derived through periphrastic constructions.
- PIE may have had as few as three "tenses" (present, aorist, perfect), which had primarily aspectual value, with secondary tensal values. The future tense was probably rendered using the subjunctive mood and/or with desiderative verbs. Other tenses were derived in the history of the individual languages through various means, such as periphrastic constructions.

There were two voices, active and passive, the latter deriving from the PIE mediopassive voice. The passive existed only in the present tense (an inherited feature, as the PIE perfect had no mediopassive). On the evidence of Gothic (the only Germanic language with a reflex of the Proto-Germanic passive) the passive voice is reconstructed to have had a significantly reduced inflectional system, with a single form used for all persons of the dual and plural. Note that, although Old Norse has an inflected mediopassive, it is not inherited from Proto-Germanic, but is an innovation formed by attaching the reflexive pronoun to the active voice.

Finally, there were three moods. The indicative and subjunctive appeared in both tenses and both voices, while the imperative appeared only in the present active and had no first-person forms. The subjunctive mood derived from the PIE optative mood, and was used to express wishes, desires as well as situations that were not regarded as or known to be real by the speaker. It was also used as a conditional mood and in reported speech.

Verbs in Proto-Germanic were divided into two main groups, called "strong" and "weak", according to the way the past tense is formed. The present tense inflection of these two groups derives from the PIE thematic inflection. A few verbs derive directly from PIE athematic verbs, and one verb *wiljaną "to want" forms its present indicative from the PIE optative mood. A third small, but very important, group of verbs formed their present tense from the PIE perfect (and their past tense like weak verbs). Since their present tense inflection is identical to the past (or preterite) tense inflection of strong verbs, they are known as preterite-present verbs.

As in other Indo-European languages, a verb in Proto-Germanic could have a preverb attached to it, modifying its meaning (cf. e.g. *fra-werþaną "to perish", derived from *werþaną "to become"). In Proto-Germanic, the preverb was still a clitic that could be separated from the verb (as also in Gothic, as shown by the behavior of second-position clitics, e.g. diz-uh-þan-sat "and then he seized", with clitics uh "and" and þan "then" interpolated into dis-sat "he seized") rather than a bound morpheme that is permanently attached to the verb (as in all other Germanic languages). At least in Gothic, preverbs could also be stacked one on top of the other (similar to Sanskrit, different from Latin), e.g. ga-ga-waírþjan "to reconcile".

=== Strong verbs ===
Strong verbs used ablaut (i.e. a different vowel in the stem) and/or reduplication to mark the past tense. Almost all Proto-Germanic strong verbs were thematic verbs formed directly from a verbal root, although a few relic verbs exhibited other formations such as j-present (from PIE -ye/yo-) or n-infix verbs.

Strong verbs were divided into seven main classes, distinguished by the ablaut pattern, which in turn was usually determined by the shape of the root. The first six classes formed the past tense with ablaut alone, and the seventh class formed it through reduplication. However, there were some class 7 strong verbs that showed both ablaut and reduplication. The reduplication itself was performed by taking the first consonant of the root and prefixing it to the stem, with the vowel e in between. If the word began with s- followed by another consonant, that consonant was also duplicated.

==== Phonetic processes in strong verbs ====
The initial s- of the original stem apparently underwent Verner's law alternation when the reduplicating prefix was added, and became -z- (as in Gothic saizlēp for the past tense of slēpan, and the four Icelandic ri-verbs).

Verner's law alternations (f-b, þ-d, h-g, hw-gw, s-z) generally occurred in the final stem consonant of all strong verbs. The first and second principal parts showed the voiceless alternant, and the third and fourth showed the voiced alternant. This phenomenon is known as Grammatischer Wechsel, and survives in several West Germanic languages up to today (as in English was and were).

The alternations were somewhat more complicated in verbs containing labiovelars (hw, kw or gw), since these underwent further changes in Germanic. Generally, labiovelars were delabialised and became h, k or g when they stood next to -u-, or were preceded by -un-. This applied both to stem-initial and stem-final labiovelars, and could be seen in verbs such as *strīkwaną "to stroke", where the -u- of the ending in the past nonsingular indicative (but not subjunctive) triggered delabialisation. In *kwemaną "to come", the -u- of the past participle stem itself triggered the change.

Since gw (when it had not been delabialised at an earlier stage) generally became w in Germanic unless preceded by n, verbs ending in gw or hw (which became gw through Verner alternation) were particularly complex. If gw was preceded by n, it remained as such but the usual delabialisation rules applied. This could be seen in *þrinhwaną "to press". If gw was not preceded by n, then it became w unless next to u, in which case it was delabialised and appeared as g instead. The verb *sehwaną "to see" demonstrates this three-way consonant alternation.

The 2nd person singular past indicative ending -t generally triggered assimilation of the preceding consonant according to the Germanic spirant law:

- bt, pt > ft
- dt, tt, þt > st
- gt, kt, hwt > ht

==== Classes ====
Strong verbs had four principal parts, from which the remaining forms could be derived. Principal part 1 was the present tense, part 2 was the past singular indicative, part 3 was the remainder of the past tense, and part 4 was the past participle. If the vowel of part 1 contained -e-, it became -i- when the following ending began with -i- through i-mutation; this occurred in the 2nd and 3rd person singular forms, and the 2nd person plural form. This also happened in the entire present tense of all j-present verbs.

An example verb of each class is shown here, using different forms to demonstrate different principal parts. The first principal part is demonstrated by the infinitive without i-mutation, and by the present third-person singular indicative with i-mutation. The past third-person singular indicative is used to demonstrate the second principal part, and the second-person form with its ending -t is shown as well. The past third-person plural is used for the third principal part, and the past participle for the fourth.

Class	1	1+i	2	2+t	3	4
1	*skīnaną "to shine"	*skīnidi	*skain	*skaint	*skinun	*skinanaz
1 anom.	*stikaną "to stick"	*stikidi	*staik	*staiht	*stikun	*stikanaz
2	*beudaną "to offer"	*biudidi	*baud	*baust	*budun	*budanaz
2 anom.	*lūkaną "to close"	*lūkidi	*lauk	*lauht	*lukun	*lukanaz
3a	*singwaną "to sing"	*singwidi	*sangw	*sanht	*sungun	*sunganaz
3b	*helpaną "to help"	*hilpidi	*halp	*halft	*hulpun	*hulpanaz
4	*kwemaną "to come"	*kwimidi	*kwam	*kwamt	*kwēmun	*kumanaz
5	*sehwaną "to see"	*sihwidi	*sahw	*saht	*sēgun	*sewanaz
5 j-present	*sitjaną "to sit"	*sitiþi	*sat	*sast	*sētun	*setanaz
6	*faraną "to travel"	*faridi	*fōr	*fōrt	*fōrun	*faranaz
7a	*hlaupaną "to leap"	*hlaupidi	*hehlaup	*hehlauft	*hehlaupun	*hlaupanaz
7b	*sēaną "to sow"	*sēidi	*sezō	*sezōt	*sezōun	*sēanaz

==== Endings ====
An example verb *nemaną "to take" is shown here to illustrate the inflection of strong verbs. Other strong verbs were inflected analogously, but with different vowels in the root and/or reduplication of the initial consonant(s). The j-present verbs were inflected like weak class 1 verbs in the present tense, but dropped the j-suffix in the past tense and then inflected like regular strong verbs.

			Indicative		Subjunctive		Imperative
			Active	Passive	Active	Passive	Active
Present	singular	1st	*nemō	*nemôi? *nemai?	*nema-ų	???	–
Present	singular	2nd	*nimizi	*nemazai	*nemaiz	*nemaizau?	*nem
Present	singular	3rd	*nimidi	*nemadai	*nemai	*nemaidau?	*nemadau
Present	dual	1st	*nemōz (?)	*nemandai	*nemaiw	*nemaindau?	–
Present	dual	2nd	*nemadiz (?)	*nemandai	*nemaidiz (?)	*nemaindau?	*nemadiz?
Present	plural	1st	*nemamaz	*nemandai	*nemaim	*nemaindau?	–
Present	plural	2nd	*nimid	*nemandai	*nemaid	*nemaindau?	*nimid
Present	plural	3rd	*nemandi	*nemandai	*nemain	*nemaindau?	*nemandau
Past	singular	1st	*nam	–	*nēmijų (?; or *nēmį̄??)	–	
Past	singular	2nd	*namt	–	*nēmīz	–	
Past	singular	3rd	*nam	–	*nēmī	–	
Past	dual	1st	*nēmū (?)	–	*nēmīw	–	
Past	dual	2nd	*nēmudiz (?)	–	*nēmīdiz (?)	–	
Past	plural	1st	*nēmum	–	*nēmīm	–	
Past	plural	2nd	*nēmud	–	*nēmīd	–	
Past	plural	3rd	*nēmun	–	*nēmīn	–	
Infinitive			*nemaną				
Present Participle			*nemandaz				
Past Participle			*numanaz				

=== Weak verbs ===
Weak verbs used a suffix containing a dental consonant to mark the past tense. This suffix is now generally held to be a reflex of the reduplicated past imperfect of PIE *dʰeh_{1}- originally "put", in Germanic "do". They were generally derived verbs, being formed from nouns, verbs or adjectives (so-called denominal, deverbal and deadjectival verbs). A few underived verbs that were originally strong j-present verbs acquired weak past tenses in Proto-Germanic.

Weak verbs were divided into five main classes, of which four survived into the distinct history of the daughter languages. One class was formed by a few relic verbs which have no present-tense suffix, but the verbs in the other classes had a present-tense suffix, which varied from class to class. The past tense endings were always identical, and resembled those of strong verbs, but prefixed with a dental infix. They were as follows:

		Indicative	Subjunctive
singular	1st	*-(d)ǭ	*-(d)ēdijų (or *-(d)ēdį̄)
singular	2nd	*-(d)ēz	*-(d)ēdīz
singular	3rd	*-(d)ē	*-(d)ēdī
dual	1st	*-(d)ēdū (?)	*-(d)ēdīw
dual	2nd	*-(d)ēdudiz (?)	*-(d)ēdīdiz (?)
plural	1st	*-(d)ēdum	*-(d)ēdīm
plural	2nd	*-(d)ēdud	*-(d)ēdīd
plural	3rd	*-(d)ēdun	*-(d)ēdīn
Past Participle		*-(d)az	

The initial consonant of the suffix was normally -d-, but the class 1 j-present verbs, the suffixless weak verbs and the preterite-present verbs had -t- if the ending consonant of the stem was an obstruent, in which case the obstruent assimilated to the dental.

==== Suffixless weak verbs ====
Already a small relic class in Proto-Germanic, at most three verbs are reconstructible: *bringaną "to bring", *brūkaną "to need", *būaną "to dwell". Their present tense was identical to the present of strong verbs, and their past tense was formed with no linking vowel; their third-person singular past indicative forms were *branhtē, *brūhtē and *būdē respectively. This class did not survive as a distinct class in any daughter language, and its verbs were moved to other classes of verb.

==== Class 1 ====
Class 1 consisted of verbs ending in -(i)janą, and has a past tense in -id-. The present tense suffix varied between -ja/ija- and -i/ī-.

A significant subclass of class 1 weak verbs were causative verbs. These were formed in a way that reflects a direct inheritance from the PIE causative class of verbs. PIE causatives were formed by adding an accented suffix -éye/éyo to the o-grade of a non-derived verb. In Proto-Germanic, this suffix survives as -j/ij-, and is affixed to the stem of the strong past tense with Verner's Law voicing applied (originally due to the placement of the accent on the suffix). Examples:

- *bītaną (I) "to bite" → *baitijaną "to bridle, yoke, restrain", i.e. "to make bite down"
- *rīsaną (I) "to rise" → *raizijaną "to raise", i.e. "to cause to rise"
- *beuganą (II) "to bend" → *baugijaną "to bend (transitive)"
- *brinnaną (III) "to burn" → *brannijaną "to burn (transitive)"
- *frawerþaną (III) "to perish" → *frawardijaną "to destroy", i.e. "to cause to perish"
- *nesaną (V) "to survive" → *nazjaną "to save", i.e. "to cause to survive"
- *ligjaną (V) "to lie down" → *lagjaną "to lay", i.e. "to cause to lie down"
- *faraną (VI) "to travel, go" → *fōrijaną "to lead, bring", i.e. "to cause to go"
- *faraną (VI) "to travel, go" → *farjaną "to carry across", i.e. "to cause to travel" (an archaic instance of the o-grade ablaut used despite the differing past-tense ablaut)
- *grētaną (VII) "to weep" → *grōtijaną "to cause to weep"
- *lais (I, preterite-present) "(s)he knows" → *laizijaną "to teach", i.e. "to cause to know"

An example class 1 weak verb *dailijaną "to divide" is shown here in the present tense. Note that because of Sievers' law, there are two possible endings in the present tense. One set, the one shown here, is used for long stems, and has -ij- and -ī-. The other set, used for short stems, has -j- and -i-. In the past, both sets have -i-.

			Indicative		Subjunctive		Imperative
			Active	Passive	Active	Passive	Active
Present	singular	1st	*dailijō	*dailijôi? *dailijai?	*dailijaų	???	–
Present	singular	2nd	*dailīsi	*dailijasai	*dailijais	*dailijaisau?	*dailī?
Present	singular	3rd	*dailīþi	*dailijaþai	*dailijai	*dailijaiþau?	*dailijaþau
Present	dual	1st	*dailijōs (?)	*dailijanþai	*dailijaiw	*dailijainþau?	–
Present	dual	2nd	*dailijaþiz (?)	*dailijanþai	*dailijaiþiz (?)	*dailijainþau?	*dailijaþiz?
Present	plural	1st	*dailijamaz	*dailijanþai	*dailijaim	*dailijainþau?	–
Present	plural	2nd	*dailīþ	*dailijanþai	*dailijaiþ	*dailijainþau?	*dailīþ
Present	plural	3rd	*dailijanþi	*dailijanþai	*dailijain	*dailijainþau?	*dailijanþau
Past	singular	1st	*dailidǭ	–	*dailidēdijų (or *dailidēdį̄)	–	
Past	singular	2nd	*dailidēz	–	*dailidēdīz	–	
Past	singular	3rd	*dailidē	–	*dailidēdī	–	
Past	dual	1st	*dailidēdū (?)	–	*dailidēdīw	–	
Past	dual	2nd	*dailidēdudiz (?)	–	*dailidēdīdiz (?)	–	
Past	plural	1st	*dailidēdum	–	*dailidēdīm	–	
Past	plural	2nd	*dailidēdud	–	*dailidēdīd	–	
Past	plural	3rd	*dailidēdun	–	*dailidēdīn	–	
Infinitive			*dailijaną				
Present Participle			*dailijandaz				

A few irregular verbs in this class were j-presents, and had the suffix only in the present tense, analogous with the strong j-presents. Their past tense replaced the initial -d- with -t-, with the preceding consonant assimilating to the suffix according to the Germanic spirant law:

Infinitive	Pres 3rd sg.	Pres 3rd pl.	Past 3rd sg.	Past 3rd pl.
*bugjaną "to buy"	*bugiþi	*bugjanþi	*buhtē	*buhtēdun
*sōkijaną "to seek"	*sōkīþi	*sōkijanþi	*sōhtē	*sōhtēdun
*wurkijaną "to work"	*wurkīþi	*wurkijanþi	*wurhtē	*wurhtēdun
*þankijaną "to think"	*þankīþi	*þankijanþi	*þanhtē	*þanhtēdun
*þunkijaną "to seem"	*þunkīþi	*þunkijanþi	*þunhtē	*þunhtēdun

==== Class 2 ====
Class 2 consisted of verbs ending in -ôną. They had a past tense in -ōd-, and the present tense suffix was trimoric -ô-. It was originally a denominative subclass of class 1, formed from nouns that ended in -ō. However, because of the loss of -j- between vowels, the surrounding vowels contracted, creating a distinct class. Already in Proto-Germanic, new verbs of this class had begun to be formed from nouns of other classes. It would later become the primary denominative class in most of the daughter languages.

The verb *salbôną "to anoint" is given here as an example. Notice that because of the vowel contraction, the indicative and subjunctive have mostly become alike.

			Indicative		Subjunctive		Imperative
			Active	Passive	Active	Passive	Active
Present	singular	1st	*salbô	*salbôi	*salbǫ̂	???	–
Present	singular	2nd	*salbôsi	*salbôsai	*salbôs	*salbôsau?	*salbô?
Present	singular	3rd	*salbôþi	*salbôþai	*salbô	*salbôþau?	*salbôþau
Present	dual	1st	*salbôs (?)	*salbônþai	*salbôw	*salbônþau?	–
Present	dual	2nd	*salbôþiz (?)	*salbônþai	*salbôþiz (?)	*salbônþau?	*salbôþiz?
Present	plural	1st	*salbômaz	*salbônþai	*salbôm	*salbônþau?	–
Present	plural	2nd	*salbôþ	*salbônþai	*salbôþ	*salbônþau?	*salbôþ
Present	plural	3rd	*salbônþi	*salbônþai	*salbôn	*salbônþau?	*salbônþau
Past	1st singular		*salbōdǭ	–	*salbōdēdijų (or *salbōdēdį̄)	–	
Past	etc.		etc.	–	etc.	–	
Past	3rd plural		*salbōdēdun	–	*salbōdēdīn	–	
Infinitive			*salbôną				
Present Participle			*salbôndaz				

==== Class 3 ====
This class had two subclasses, which were mostly different in the forms, but they shared the suffix -ai- in some. The two subclasses merged into one in all the later languages for reasons that are not quite clear, but presumably the fact that they shared some endings may have had something to do with it.

The first and larger subclass formed stative verbs. They had an infinitive in -(i)janą and a past tense in -d- with no linking vowel (but generally with no assimilation either). The present tense suffix varied between -ja/ija- and -ai-. These verbs were statives. The verb *sagjaną "to say" is shown here. Like class 1 weak verbs, the -j- varied with -ij- depending on the length of the stem.

			Indicative		Subjunctive		Imperative
			Active	Passive	Active	Passive	Active
Present	singular	1st	*sagjō	*sagjôi? *sagjai?	*sagjaų	???	–
Present	singular	2nd	*sagaisi	*sagjasai	*sagjais	*sagjaisau?	*sagai?
Present	singular	3rd	*sagaiþi	*sagjaþai	*sagjai	*sagjaiþau?	*sagjaþau
Present	dual	1st	*sagjōs (?)	*sagjanþai	*sagjaiw	*sagjainþau?	–
Present	dual	2nd	*sagjaþiz (?)	*sagjanþai	*sagjaiþiz (?)	*sagjainþau?	*sagjaþiz?
Present	plural	1st	*sagjamaz	*sagjanþai	*sagjaim	*sagjainþau?	–
Present	plural	2nd	*sagaiþ	*sagjanþai	*sagjaiþ	*sagjainþau?	*sagaiþ
Present	plural	3rd	*sagjanþi	*sagjanþai	*sagjain	*sagjainþau?	*sagjanþau
Past	1st singular		*sagdǭ	–	*sagdēdijų (or *sagdēdį̄)	–	
Past	etc.		etc.	–	etc.	–	
Past	3rd plural		*sagdēdun	–	*sagdēdīn	–	
Infinitive			*sagjaną				
Present Participle			*sagjandaz				

The second subclass formed factitive verbs. They had an infinitive in -āną and a past tense in -ād-, with -ā- having contracted from earlier -aja- after loss of intervocalic -j-. The present tense suffix varied between -ā- and -ai-. These verbs were factitives, similar to the first class of weak verbs. It was already a small class in Proto-Germanic, though it may have remained marginally productive. The verb *þewāną "to enslave" is shown here.

			Indicative		Subjunctive		Imperative
			Active	Passive	Active	Passive	Active
Present	singular	1st	*þewô	???	???	???	–
Present	singular	2nd	*þewaisi	*þewāsai	*þewāis?	*þewāisau?	*þewai?
Present	singular	3rd	*þewaiþi	*þewāþai	*þewāi?	*þewāiþau?	*þewāþau
Present	dual	1st	*þewôs (?)	*þewānþai	*þewāiw?	*þewāinþau?	–
Present	dual	2nd	*þewāþiz (?)	*þewānþai	*þewāiþiz?	*þewāinþau?	*þewāþiz?
Present	plural	1st	*þewāmaz	*þewānþai	*þewāim?	*þewāinþau?	–
Present	plural	2nd	*þewaiþ	*þewānþai	*þewāiþ?	*þewāinþau?	*þewaiþ
Present	plural	3rd	*þewānþi	*þewānþai	*þewāin?	*þewāinþau?	*þewānþau
Past	1st singular		*þewādǭ	–	*þewādēdijų (or *þewādēdį̄)	–	
Past	etc.		etc.	–	etc.	–	
Past	3rd plural		*þewādēdun	–	*þewādēdīn	–	
Infinitive			*þewāną				
Present Participle			*þewāndaz				

==== Class 4 ====
This class has been notoriously difficult to reconstruct, but some details are known. The infinitive ended in -naną, and the past tense was formed with -nōd-. The present tense forms are uncertain, but probably varied between -ō- and -a-. These verbs were inchoatives, and indicated a change of state or the process of coming into that state. As a result, they were always intransitive, and had no passive forms or a past participle. The verb *liznaną "to learn" is given here, but note that these reconstructions are very uncertain.

			Indicative	Subjunctive	Imperative
Present	singular	1st	*liznô, *liznōmi	*liznaų	–
Present	singular	2nd	*liznōsi	*liznais	*liznō
Present	singular	3rd	*liznōþi	*liznai	*liznōþau
Present	dual	1st	*liznôs (?)	*liznaiw	–
Present	dual	2nd	*liznaþiz (?)	*liznaiþiz (?)	*liznaþiz?
Present	plural	1st	*liznamaz	*liznaim	–
Present	plural	2nd	*liznaþ, *liznōþ, *lizniþ	*liznaiþ	*liznaþ, *liznōþ, *lizniþ
Present	plural	3rd	*liznanþi	*liznain	*liznanþau
Past	1st singular		*liznōdǭ	*liznōdēdijų (or *liznōdēdį̄)	–
Past	etc.		etc.	etc.	–
Past	3rd plural		*liznōdēdun	*liznōdēdīn	–
Infinitive			*liznaną		
Present Participle			*liznandaz		

=== Preterite-present verbs ===
Preterite-present verbs were in principle weak verbs, since they formed their past tense with the weak dental suffix. However, they were unique in that their present tense forms were not those of the other verbs; rather, they were identical to the past tense forms of strong verbs. They descended from old Indo-European verbs that retained their stative meaning rather than being reinterpreted as past tense forms.

== Syntax ==
Not many details are known from Proto-Germanic syntax since the earliest preserved texts are usually translations of Greek or Latin texts that follow the word order of the original text very closely. Nonetheless, some pieces of Proto-Germanic syntax can be reconstructed.

The general word order was subject–object–verb: objects preceded their verbs, and genitives and adjectives preceded the nouns they modified. That is shown most clearly in early inscriptions such as on the golden horns of Gallehus in which the verb is placed last in the sentence. Prepositions could be placed either before or after their clause. Since case endings marked the function of words within the sentence, word order was still free, and words could be placed differently in the sentence, usually in the first position, for emphasis.

Sentence clitics were still placed in second position within the sentence in accordance with Wackernagel's law. That is attested very clearly in Gothic in which such clitics may even intervene between a verb and its attached prefix. Interrogative sentences probably had the word about which a question was being asked (usually the verb) placed first, and in case of yes/no questions an interrogative particle may have been attached to the first word (as in Gothic).

At some point in the history of the language, placing finite verbs second in the sentence became more frequent, perhaps beginning with auxiliary verbs. That survives most clearly in Dutch and German, where the auxiliary verb is placed second, but the remaining verbs are still placed at the end. However, most modern Germanic languages, including Dutch and German, have a more restrictive word order known as V2 word order, in which the finite verb, whether it is an auxiliary or not, is always placed second in main clauses (however not in Dutch and German subordinate clauses). It also remained optional for a long time, with verbs still occasionally appearing in other positions for poetic reasons in Middle Dutch.

Neither the reason nor how far the development had progressed by the time the language had begun to break up into dialects is certain. One hypothesis suggests that since auxiliary verbs were often unstressed, they functioned similar to clitics and so may have been preferentially placed second in the sentence, like other clitics. That would explain the later development of V2 word order as well since it forces verbs to precede their subjects if another word is placed first in the sentence, much like the way clitics separate prefixes from their attached words in Gothic.

Proto-Germanic may have been a pro-drop language since verb inflection generally distinguished person and number. However, since some verb endings had already fallen together, especially in the strong past singular and in the passive voice, the use of personal pronouns must have already been common, but it was likely still optional.
