= Mansi (name) =

Mansi is a given name and surname. Notable people with the name include:

== Given name ==
- Mansi Aggarwal
- Mansi Ahlawat
- Mansi Barberis
- Mansi Joshi (born 18 August 1993), Indian international cricketer
- Mansi Sharma (born 16 March 1989) is an Indian actress, entrepreneur and model
- Mansi Srivastava (born 21 September 1990) is an Indian actress

== Surname ==
- Ahmed Mansi
- Gaetano Mansi
- Giovanni Domenico Mansi (1692–1769), Italian theologian, scholar, historian and archbishop
- John Mansi (disambiguation)
  - John Louis Mansi (1926–2010), British television and film actor
  - John Domenico Mansi (1692–1769), Italian prelate, theologian, scholar and historian
- Kate Mansi, American actress born in 1987
- Lucida Mansi
- Maurizio Mansi
- Mohamed Mansi Qandil (Mohamed al-Mansi Qandil)
- Nasser Mansi, Egyptian footballer
- Vittorino Mansi

== See also ==
- Al-Mansi (disambiguation)
- Paula Dei Mansi (died after 1288), Jewish female scribe and Torah scholar
