= Muncie (disambiguation) =

Muncie is a city in Indiana, United States.

Muncie may also refer to:

- Muncie, Illinois, a village
- Muncie, Kansas, a neighborhood

== People with the surname ==
- Chuck Muncie (1953–2013), American football player

== See also ==
- Muncey, surname
- Muncy (disambiguation)
- Munsee (disambiguation)
- Munsey (disambiguation)
