= Principal parts =

Grammar concept denoting roots of verbs

In language learning, the principal parts of a verb are the most fundamental forms of a verb that can be conjugated into any form of the verb. The concept originates in the humanist Latin schools, where students learned verbs by chanting them in the four key forms from which all other forms can be deduced, for example:

ferō – ferre – tulī – lātum ('to carry')

Not all languages have to be taught in this way. In French, for example, regular verbs can be deduced from a single form, the infinitive, and irregular verbs are too random to be systematized under fixed parts. But the concept can be carried over to many languages in which the verbs have some kind of "regular irregularity", i.e. irregularity always occurs at the same place in an otherwise regular system.

Although the term 'principal part' is usually applied to verbs, the same phenomenon can be found in some languages in nouns and other word types.

== Classical languages ==
=== Latin ===
In Latin, most verbs have four principal parts. For example, the verb for "to carry" is given as portō – portāre – portāvī – portātum, where portō is the first-person singular present active indicative ("I carry"), portāre is the present active infinitive ("to carry"), portāvī is the first-person singular perfect active indicative ("I carried"), and portātum is the neuter supine. Most of the verb forms in Latin derive from the first two principal parts: portābō, "I shall carry", is derived from the root portā-, taken from the present infinitive. However, all active perfect forms are derived from the third principal part (so portāveram, "I had carried", is taken from portāv-) while the perfect participle (portātus, portāta, portātum, "having been carried") is derived from the supine and is used to form the perfect passive participle with the auxiliary verb sum (such as portātum est, "it has been carried"). The auxiliary verb is often dropped when writing poetry in Latin.

For many Latin verbs, the principal parts are predictable: portō shown above uses a single stem, port-, and all principal parts are derived from them with the endings -ō – -āre – -āvī – -ātum. Others have more complicated forms: regō ("I rule") has the perfect form rēxī and perfect participle rēctum, derived as *reg-sī and *reg-tum. A handful of verbs, such as sum – esse – fuī – futūrum ("to be"), are simply irregular.

A number of verbs have fewer than four principal parts: deponent verbs, such as hortŏr – hortāri – hortātus sum, "to exhort", lack a perfect form, as do semi-deponent verbs, such as audeō – audēre – ausus sum, "to dare"; in both cases, passive forms are treated as active, so all perfect forms are covered by the perfect participle. A handful of verbs are also defective, including the verb ōdī – ōdisse, "to hate", which only has perfect forms derived from a single stem.

=== Ancient Greek ===
Verbs in Ancient Greek have six principal parts: present (I), future (II), aorist (III), perfect (IV), perfect middle (V) and aorist passive (VI), each listed in its first-person singular form:

- Part I forms the entire present system, as well as the imperfect.
- Part II forms the future tense in the active and middle voices.
- Part III forms the aorist in the active and middle voices.
- Part IV forms the perfect and pluperfect in the active voice, and the (exceedingly rare) future perfect, active.
- Part V forms the perfect and pluperfect in the middle voice, and the (rare) future perfect, middle.
- Part VI forms the aorist and future in the passive voice.

One principal part can sometimes be predicted from another, but not with any certainty. For some classes of verbs, however, all principal parts can be predicted given the first one.

=== Sanskrit ===
Rather than providing the lexical principal parts like in Latin and Ancient Greek dictionaries, dictionaries in Sanskrit studies provide a single verbal root, which systematically derives every form by applying a set of rules. Any "irregularity" is expressed at this root through ten classes (or gaṇá) of present-stem formation.

== Germanic languages ==
=== English ===
Excluding four common irregular verbs, the principal parts of all other English verbs are the infinitive, preterite and past participle. All forms of these English verbs can be derived from the three principal parts. Four verbs have an unpredictable 3rd person singular form and the verb "to be" is so irregular it has seven separate forms. Lists or recitations of principal parts in English often omit the third principal part's auxiliary verb, rendering it identical to its grammatically distinct participial form. For example, the verb "to take" has the principal parts take – took – (have) taken. The verb "to bet" has bet – bet – (have) bet and the verb "to break" has break – broke – (have) broken. With irregular verbs the simple present 3S (he, she, it) is derived from infinitive+'s' with the exception of spelling changes such as catch – catches, fly – flies and teach – teaches, which follow the same rules for regular 3S verbs.

==== Examples of irregular verbs and their principal parts ====
only one part is irregular
Part	rendering
infinitive	to sew
preterite (or simple past)	sewed
past participle	sewn

both parts are irregular
Part	rendering
infinitive	to sing
preterite (or simple past)	sang
past participle	sung

all forms are the same
Part	rendering
infinitive	to cut
preterite (or simple past)	cut
past participle	cut

==== Regular verbs ====
Most verbs are regular enough that all forms can be derived directly from the infinitive. For example, the verb love derives all its forms systematically (love, loved, loving, has loved, loves), and since these can all be deduced from the basic form (the citation, dictionary, or lexicographic form, which in English is the bare infinitive), no other principal parts have to be learned. With irregular verbs like the verb sing, on the other hand, the forms sang and (have) sung cannot be deduced, so the learner of English must memorize three principal parts, sing – sang – (have) sung. The present 3S (he/she/it) is derived from the infinitive+'s' with the exception of verbs ending in a single -o, or ending in -s, -x, -z or the digraphs -sh, -ch, in which case it is derived from 'infinitive+es'. With three irregular verbs (and their derivatives) the 3S has to be learnt independently (e.g. has, does, undoes, redoes).

ends in the letter e
Part	rendering
infinitive	to score
preterite	scored
past participle	scored

other endings
Part	rendering
infinitive	to risk
preterite	risked
past participle	risked

doubling consonants
Part	rendering
infinitive	to stop
preterite	stopped
past participle	stopped

==== Highly irregular verbs ====
There are three verbs (in addition to their derivatives) with an irregular third person singular form in the present tense. As a result, three principal parts are insufficient to conjugate these fully.

to have
Part	rendering
infinitive	to have
present 3S	has (hæz)
preterite	had
past participle	had

to say
Part	rendering
infinitive	to say
present 3S	says (sɛz)
preterite	said
past participle	said

to do
Part	rendering
infinitive	to do
present 3S	does (dʌz)
preterite	did
past participle	done

==== To be ====
The verb "to be" is completely irregular having seven separate forms.

To be with seven different forms
Part	rendering
infinitive	to be
present 1S	am
present plural and 2S	are
present 3S	is
preterite 1S and 3S	was
preterite plural and 2S	were
past participle	been

=== German ===
The situation in German is very similar to English. Regular verbs require no memorizing of principal parts, since all forms can be deduced from the infinitive. However, some uncertainty may exist as to the choice of the perfect auxiliary, which could be haben ('to have') or sein ('to be'). This can be solved by memorizing the infinitive with the third-person singular perfect tense, which some teachers recommend.

tanzen – er hat getanzt

Strong verbs and irregular weak verbs are more complicated. As in English, these verbs are usually memorized by means of three principal parts: infinitive – third-person singular past tense – third-person singular perfect tense.

singen – sang – gesungen ('to sing' – a typical strong verb)
bringen – brachte – gebracht ('to bring' – an irregular weak verb)

However, in order to deduce the full paradigm, learners must also know the third-person singular present and the third-person singular past subjunctive, which involve some peculiarities.

A small number of verbs have other irregularities, most of which are limited to the forms of the present tense.

=== Icelandic ===
There are four types of principal parts in the Icelandic language, determined by the type of verb:

==== Weak verbs ====
Icelandic weak verbs have the following principal parts:

First principal part	Second principal part	Third principal part
Infinitive	First person singular past tense indicative mood	Past participle
að borða ("to eat")	ég borðaði ("I ate")	ég hef borðað ("I have eaten)
Að elska ("to love")	ég elskaði ("I loved")	ég hef elskað ("I have loved")

It is possible to make the present subjunctive mood (þótt ég borði, "though I eat") from the first principal part (að borða, "to eat"). It is also possible to make the past subjunctive mood (þótt ég borðaði, "though I ate") from the second principal part (ég borðaði, "I ate").

In some other classes of weak verbs without 'a' as the thematic vowel, the present indicative singular undergoes more changes, but they are still to a large extent predictable.

==== Strong verbs ====
Icelandic strong verbs have the following principal parts:

First principal part	Second principal part	Third principal part	Fourth principal part
Infinitive	First person singular past tense indicative mood	First person plural past tense indicative mood	Past participle
Að finna ("to find")	Ég fann ("I found")	Við fundum ("we found")	Ég hef fundið ("I have found")

It is possible to make the present subjunctive mood (þótt ég finni, "though I find") from the first principal part (að finna, "to find"). It is also possible to make the past subjunctive mood (þótt ég fyndi, "though I found") from the third principal part (við fundum, "we found").

The present singular indicative in this class also undergoes more changes (i-umlaut, dental suffix assimilation etc.), which may let some verbs seem irregular at first glance. They are, however, mainly regular changes, like those in the weak verbs.

==== Preterite-present verb ====
Icelandic Preterite-present verbs have the following principal parts:

First principal part	Second principal part	Third principal part	Fourth principal part
Infinitive	First person singular present tense indicative mood	First person singular past tense indicative mood	Past participle
Að kunna ("to know")	Ég kann ("I know")	Ég kunni ("I knew")	Ég hef kunnað ("I've known")

It is possible to make the present subjunctive mood (þótt ég kunni, "though I knew") from the first principal part (að kunna, "to know"). It is also possible to make the past subjunctive mood (þótt ég kynni, "though I knew") from the third principal part (ég kunni, "I knew").

==== Ri-verbs ====
Icelandic Ri-verbs have the following principal parts:

First principal part	Second principal part	Third principal part
Infinitive	First person singular past tense indicative mood	Past participle
Að snúa ("to turn")	Ég sneri ("I turned")	Ég hef snúið ("I have turned")
Að gróa ("to heal")	Ég greri ("I healed")	Ég hef gróið ("I have healed")
Að núa ("to rub")	Ég neri ("I rubbed")	Ég hef núið ("I have rubbed")
Að róa ("to row")	Ég reri ("I rowed")	Ég hef róið ("I have rowed")

It is possible to make the present subjunctive mood (þótt ég snúi, "though I turn") from the first principal part (að snúa, "to turn"). It is also possible to make the past subjunctive mood (þótt ég sneri, "though I turned") from the second principal part (ég sneri, "I turned").

== Others ==
=== Spanish ===
Excluding a few highly irregular verbs, in Spanish, verbs are traditionally held to have only one principal part, the infinitive, by which one can classify the verb into one of three conjugation paradigms (according to the ending of the infinitive, which may be -ar, -er or -ir). However, some scholars believe that the conjugation could be regularized by adding another principal part to vowel-alternating verbs, which shows the alternation. For example, herir "to hurt" is usually considered irregular because its conjugation contains forms like hiero "I hurt", hieres "you hurt", where the vowel in the root changes into a diphthong. However, by including the first person singular, present tense, indicative mood form (hiero) as a principal part, and noting that the diphthong appears only when that syllable is stressed, the conjugation of herir becomes completely predictable.

=== French ===
Regular verbs are formed from a single principal part (the infinitive), and all conjugations derive from this one principal part. A handful of verbs require spelling changes in which case it can be considered that these verbs technically have two or three principal parts depending on how many spelling changes need to be made. They include doubling a consonant, adding accent markers, adding the letter e, and converting letters for example y becoming i.

==== Seven principal parts ====
Irregular verbs are markedly more complicated, requiring seven principal parts of which few can be easily derived from the infinitive. For some verbs a few of their principal parts are identical with one another.

Principal part	How to get the stem	"Inherited" (regular) value of stem
infinitive	Remove ending -er, -ir, -oir, -re	—
First singular present indicative (1S)	Remove ending -s, -e	Infinitive stem
First plural present indicative (1P)	Remove ending -ons	Infinitive stem
Third plural present indicative (3P)	Remove ending -ent	First plural present stem
(First singular) future (FUT)	Remove ending -ai	Full infinitive stem (minus any -e)
(Masculine singular) past participle (PP)	Full word	Infinitive stem, plus -i (plus -u if ends -re)
(First singular) simple past (PAST)	Remove ending -s, -ai	Past participle (minus any -s or -t)

The paradigm goes as follows:

Paradigm for most irregular verbs (7 principal parts)
	Indicative				Subjunctive		Conditional	Imperative
	Present	Simple past	Imperfect	Future	Present	Imperfect	Present	Present
je	1S+s	PAST+s	1P+ais	FUT+ai	3P+e	PAST+sse	FUT+ais	
tu	1S+s	PAST+s	1P+ais	FUT+as	3P+es	PAST+sses	FUT+ais	(same as pres. indic. 3rd. sg. if ends with vowel, else 2nd. sg.)
il/elle	1S+t^{1}	PAST+t	1P+ait	FUT+a	3P+e	PAST+ˆt	FUT+ait	
nous	1P+ons	PAST+ˆmes	1P+ions	FUT+ons	1P+ions	PAST+ssions	FUT+ions	(same as pres. indic. 1st pl.)
vous	1P+ez	PAST+ˆtes	1P+iez	FUT+ez	1P+iez	PAST+ssiez	FUT+iez	(same as pres. indic. 2nd pl.)
ils/elles	3P+ent	PAST+rent	1P+aient	FUT+ont	3P+ent	PAST+ssent	FUT+aient	

^{1} The -t is regularly dropped when directly following a d or t (e.g. il vend "he sells", not *il vendt).

===== Example with plaire =====
" Plaire (to please [someone]) and conjugations with 7 principal parts
	Indicative					Subjunctive		Conditional	Imperative
	Present	Simple past	Imperfect	Future	Present Perfect	Present	Imperfect	Present	Present
je / j'	plais	plus	plaisais	plairai	ai plu	plaise	plusse	plairais	
tu	plais	plus	plaisais	plairas	as plu	plaises	plusses	plairais	plais
il/elle	plaît	plut	plaisait	plaira	a plu	plaise	plût	plairait	
nous	plaisons	plûmes	plaisions	plairons	avons plu	plaisions	plussions	plairions	plaisons
vous	plaisez	plûtes	plaisiez	plairez	avez plu	plaisiez	plussiez	plairiez	plaisez
ils/elles	plaisent	plurent	plaisaient	plairont	ont plu	plaisent	plussent	plairaient	

==== Verbs with 11 principal parts ====
A few highly irregular verbs require 11 principal parts to conjugate them fully. It includes all of the seven principal parts as well as a subjunctive form and different present participle forms, imperative forms and present-participle forms.

==== Fully irregular verbs ====
The verbs être, avoir and aller are so irregular they require even more than 11 principal parts.

=== Scottish Gaelic ===
In Scottish Gaelic there are two principal parts for the regular verb: the imperative and the verbal noun, for example pòg – pògadh 'to kiss'. All finite forms can be deduced from the imperative pòg ('kiss!'), all non-finite forms from the verbal noun pògadh ('kissing'). The ten irregular verbs can, with only two or three small aberrations (unexpected lenition), be deduced from four principal parts.

=== Ganda ===
The principal parts of a Ganda verb are the imperative (identical to the verb stem), the first person singular of the present tense and the modified stem. For example, the verb okwogera 'to speak' has the principal parts yogera – njogera – yogedde.

The present tense, far past tense, near future tense, far future tense, subjunctive and infinitive are derived from the imperative. The present perfect, conditional and near past tense are derived from the modified stem.

In theory the second principal part can be derived from the first, but in practice this is so complicated that it is usually memorised as a separate principal part.

(See also Ganda verbs.)

== See also ==
- Regular and irregular verbs
- Grammatical conjugation
- Latin conjugation
- Root (linguistics)
- Lemma (morphology)
