= Munsee grammar =

Grammar of Munsee

Munsee (also known as Munsee Delaware, Delaware, Ontario Delaware) is an endangered language of the Eastern Algonquian subgroup of the Algonquian language family, itself a branch of the Algic language family.

The grammar of Munsee is characterized by complex inflectional and derivational morphology. Inflection in Munsee is realized through the use of prefixes and suffixes added to word stems to indicate grammatical information, including number (singular or plural), animacy (understood as grammatical gender), person, possession, negation, and obviation.

Nouns use combinations of person prefixes and suffixes to indicate possession and suffixes to indicate gender, number, diminution, absentation, and obviation.

Verbs use a single set of person prefixes and a series of suffixes in position classes after the verb stem to indicate combinations of person, number, negation, obviation, and other morphological information.

== Word classes ==
There are three primary word classes in Munsee Delaware: Noun, Verb, and Particle. There are two subtypes of nouns: Animate and Inanimate. Pronouns in several subtypes can be considered subtypes of the Noun category. Several verbal subclasses are distinguished, with cross-cutting categorization for gender and transitivity defining the four major subclasses: Animate Intransitive, Inanimate Intransitive, Transitive Animate, and Transitive Inanimate. Other verb classes are derived from these primary classes: Transitivized Animate Intransitive, Double Object Transitive, and Objectless Transitive Inanimate, exemplified below. Particles are words that do not select for inflectional prefixes or suffixes.

== Nominal categories ==
=== Gender ===
Nouns are classified as either animate or inanimate. Animate nouns include all biologically animate entities, as well as some items not thought of as biologically animate. The gender of the base noun is reflected by the selection of the plural inflectional suffix: /-al/ for inanimate nouns, and /-ak/ for animate nouns.

Gender – Munsee Animate and Inanimate Nouns
Animate	English	Inanimate	English
áxko·k	snake	wté·hi·m	strawberry
lə́nəw	man	xwáskwi·m	corn
mătán'to·w	devil	máhkahkw	pumpkin
wə̆la·kanahó·nšuy	American Elm	paxkší·kan	knife
pí·lkəš	peach	e·həntáxpo·n	table
óhpən	potato	kehkšə́te·k	stove
lehlo·kíhla·š	red raspberry	tánkalo·ns	bullet
níhkaš	my fingernail	áhpapo·n	chair
kó·n	snow	payaxkhí·kan	gun
né·naxkw	ball	pónkw	dust

Gender is an inherent property of nouns, but is cross-referenced through agreement in several areas of Munsee grammar. In addition to being marked inflectionally in plural forms of nouns, gender is also selected for in the formation of verb stems, is marked in agreement in the inflection of verbs, and is realized in sets of pronouns. The nature of the gender system has been a topic of debate. Some analysts have viewed the assignment of gender as arbitrary, while others view it as being semantically or culturally motivated; intermediate positions have also been proposed.

=== Noun inflection ===
==== Number ====
Nouns are inflected for plural number by selecting the appropriate plural suffix: ăsə́n 'stone' (Inanimate), ăsə́nal 'stones' (suffix /-al/); mwá·kane·w 'dog' (Animate), mwa·kané·wak 'dogs' (suffix /-ak/). There is no suffix for indicating singular.

==== Proximate and obviative ====
Animate nouns in certain constructions may take an obviative ending, which does not distinguish singular or plural. The obviative distinguishes two third-person referents in certain syntactic and discourse contexts. In a sentence containing a transitive verb with both an animate third person grammatical subject and an animate third person grammatical object one of the two must be marked as obviative. Any animate third person element that is not obviative is proximate. There is no suffixal marking for proximate.

Although the exact significance of the proximate versus obviative distinction has been disputed, a general view is that the proximate noun phrase is more in focus, while the obviative is less in focus or backgrounded.

In the following sentence the first word 'woman' is the grammatical object and is marked obviative with the suffix /-al/: oxkwé·wal wə̆ne·wá·wal lénəw 'the man sees the woman' (woman-obviative third-sees-third man-proximate). Obviation is also marked on the verb with the suffix /-al/. Obviation is only marked on Transitive Animate verbs, and there is no obviative marking on inanimate nouns or verbs.

==== Nominal possession ====
Nouns may indicate the person and number of a possessor through combinations of personal prefixes and suffixes indicating plurality. The prefixes are (a) /nə-/ 'first person': nə̆máhksən 'my shoe'; /kə-/ 'second person': kə̆máhksən 'your shoe'; /wə-/ 'third person': wə̆náxk 'his hand.'

==== Locative ====
Nouns may indicate a locative with the locative suffix /-ənk/: wí·kwahm 'house,' wi·kwáhmənk 'in the house.'

==== Diminutive ====
The noun suffix /-əš/ adds the meaning 'small, cute' and other affective elements to a base noun: máxkw 'bear,' máxkwəš 'little bear.' Some words with the diminutive reflect a specialized meaning: wí·kwahm 'house' but wí·kwáhməš 'toilet, outhouse.' For some words, the words undergo a mutation from their base forms: takwax 'turtle,' čakwaxəš 'little turtle', or asən 'stone,' əšənəš 'little stone.' This occurs as a result of Diminutive Consonant Harmony, where /t/ is palatalized to /č/ and /s/ is palatalized to /š/ when modified by the diminutive.

A small number of nouns reflect an older diminutive suffix /-əs/ which has lost its diminutive meaning: áxko·k 'snake' but with old diminutive suffix axkó·kəs 'insect.'

==== Absentative ====
Nouns can be marked as referring to a person who is deceased, with a suffix /-aya/ 'third person' or /-ənkala/ 'obviative.' The use of the absentative in Munsee is restricted to deceased persons or kinship terms used to refer to deceased individuals ši·fšáya 'the late Cephas.' The Unami absentative has a broader range of use.

== Verb classes ==
Verb stems occur in pairs, distinguished by gender. Intransitive verbs select for an animate subject or an inanimate subject, and are referred to as Animate Intransitive: wá·psəw 's/he is white,' or Inanimate Intransitive: wá·pe·w 'it is white.'

Transitive stems select for the gender of their object, and are referred to as either Transitive Animate: ntánha·w 'I lose him,' or Transitive Inanimate: ntaníhto·n 'I lose it.'

Intransitive verbs inflect for their subject, agreeing in person, number and gender of the subject. Transitive verbs inflect for subject and object, agreeing in person, number, and gender of both subject and object. Transitive Animate verbs also agree for obviation.

Certain Animate Intransitive verbs inflect for a secondary object making Transitivized Animate Intransitive verbs: náh ntəlá·he·n 'I threw it over there.' Morphologically, the verb stem /əla·he·-/ 'throw something in a certain direction or manner' has the structure of an Animate Intransitive verb, but is inflected for a third-person object.

Similarly, some Transitive Animate verbs inflect for a secondary object, forming ditransitive verbs, termed Double Object Transitive: nkəmó·tə̆ma·n 'I stole it from him.'

Certain verbs, termed Objectless Transitive Inanimate, which have the morphological characteristics of verbs of the Transitive Inanimate class, occur without a grammatical object.

Some Objectless Transitive Inanimate verbs also have corresponding Transitive Inanimate verbs.

(a) no·le·lə́ntam 'I am glad.'

(b) no·le·lə́ntamən 'I am glad about it.'

Others never have an object.

(a) šántham 'he kicks out his legs.'

(b) psə́m 'he has something in his eye.'

=== Verbal inflection ===
Verbs are inflected in three subclasses referred to Orders. These correspond roughly to three major clause types: Independent Order, forming main clause statements and questions; Conjunct Order, forming dependent clauses; and Imperative Order, forming positive and negative commands. The Orders are further divided into Modes:

- Independent Order
  - Indicative Mode
  - Subordinative Mode
- Conjunct Order
  - Indicative (fossilized)
  - Changed Conjunct
  - Changed Subjunctive
  - Subjunctive
  - Participle
- Imperative Order:
  - Ordinary Mode
  - Prohibitive Mode.

The Independent Order uses sets of inflectional prefixes and suffixes, while the Conjunct and Imperative Orders use sets of inflectional suffixes only.

==== Independent Order ====
Verbs in the Indicative Mode form statements and questions: mpə́ntawa·w 'I heard him'; kpə́ntawa·w há? 'Did you hear him?' (há is a particle used in the formation of yes–no questions).

Verbs in the Subordinative Mode form complements to certain verbs and to certain particles.

(a) áhwat mpó·si·n 'It's hard for me to get in.' (verb stem /po·si·-/ 'get on board' with subordinative inflection for first-person subject)

(b) nál wə̆níhla·n 'Then he killed the other.' (verb stem /nihl-/ 'kill someone' with subordinative inflection for third-person subject and third-person object)

==== Conjunct Order ====
The Conjunct Order forms a variety of subordinate clause types. The Conjunct Indicative Mode is extremely rare, with only a few examples reported in Unami, and none in Munsee.

The Changed Conjunct Mode occurs with a restricted set of roots either as part of the verb stem or a preverb, and refers to actually occurring events. The term 'changed' refers to Initial Change, a form of vowel ablaut occurring on the first syllable of a verb or verb complex.

(a) ne·ltó·nhe·t 'as he was talking.'

(b) é·nta- nxá -katənamə́ya·n 'when I was three (years old).'

(c) é·ntxən-pə̆nó·lən 'every time I look at you.'

The Changed Subjunctive combines the subjunctive suffix /-e/ with a changed form of a verb normally formed with the preverb /e·nta-/ 'when.'

(a) é·nta-né·wăke 'when I saw him.'

(b) náh we·má·ne 'when I left from there.'

The Subjunctive Mode forms clauses referring to hypothetical situations. The subjunctive suffix /-e/ is added after the conjunct suffix.

(a) moxkánke 'if he finds it.'

The Participial Mode forms noun-like verbs in constructions resembling relative clauses, in which one of the arguments of the verb functions as the head of the phrase.

(a) e·kwə̆yá·ni·l 'my clothes' (literally 'those things that I wear')

(b) é·nta-né·wak 'where I saw him'

(c) wé·nk 'he who comes from there'

==== Imperative Order ====
Verbs in the Ordinary Mode make commands of various types, in which the listener is directed to perform or undertake an act.

(a) áhl 'put him down.'

(b) áto·kw 'let's go.'

The Prohibitive Mode makes verbs that forbid the commission of an act; they require the use of a prohibitive particle and a negative verbal suffix.

(a) čí·le păkamá·wi 'don't hit him/them (you singular)'

(b) čí· náh á·we·kw 'don't go there' (you plural)'

=== Verbal negation ===
Verbs of all types are inflected for negation, indicated with a combination of an independent negative particle and a negative suffix occurring as part of the verbal inflectional system.

(a) Transitive Animate: nə̆móxkawa·w 'I found it,' máhta nə̆moxkawá·wi 'I didn't find it.'

(b) Inanimate Intransitive: máxke·w 'it is red,' máhta maxké·wi 'it is not red.'

=== Verbal aspect ===
A category of aspect, used in the Independent and Conjunct Orders, has been distinguished for both Munsee and Unami. The categories distinguished are Unspecified, Preterite, and Present. The unspecified has no morphological expression, and hence is equivalent to regularly inflected forms of the verb. In Munsee the preterite is extremely rare, and is attested primarily in earlier material, such as the following taken from Truman Michelson's field notes (the suffix /-p/ is the realization of the preterite suffix in this form):

(a) nĕmi·lá·ne·p 'I gave it to him.'

The present aspect is attested primarily in forms with a counterfactual interpretation that is equivalent in meaning to the subjunctive. In this example the verb stem is /pa·-/ 'come,' with Conjunct Order third-person suffix /-t/ and Present suffix /-sa/.

(a) yóh á· má pá·tsa 'if he had come here.'

== Other word classes ==
=== Demonstrative pronouns ===
There are two sets of demonstrative pronouns, proximal ('close by') and distal ('farther away'). Demonstratives are distinguished for gender, number, and obviation. In a phrase they agree with the head of the noun phrase or the noun they refer to. The proximal demonstrative pronouns include: wá 'this one (animate),' yó·k 'these ones (animate),' yə́ 'this one (inanimate),' yó·l 'these ones (inanimate).' The distal pronouns include: ná 'that one (animate),' né·k 'those ones (animate),' nə́ 'that one (inanimate),' ní·l 'those ones (inanimate).'

Animate	Proximal	Distal
Singular	wa/wan	na/nan
Plural	yook	niik
Obviative	yool	niil

Inanimate	Proximal	Distal
Singular	yoon	nu/nun
Plural	yool	niil

=== Personal pronouns ===
Personal pronouns are used primarily for emphasis: ní· 'I', kí· 'you (singular), né·ka 'he, she', ni·ló·na 'we (exclusive),' ki·ló·na 'we (inclusive),' ki·ló·wa 'you (plural),' ne·ká·wa 'they.'

	Singular	Plural
1	nii	niilona (exclusive)
1	nii	kiilona (inclusive)
2	kii	kiilowa
3	keela	neekaawa

=== Reflexive pronouns ===
Reflexive pronouns are used for reflexive objects and for the grammatical objects of certain types of verbs: nhákay 'myself,' khákay 'yourself,' hwákayal 'his/herself.' In the example kwəšə̆ná·wal hwákayal 'he injures himself' the reflexive pronoun is marked with the obviative suffix /-al/, as is the verb.

=== Interrogative-indefinite pronouns ===
The interrogative-indefinite pronouns have both interrogative and indefinite usages. The pronouns are animate awé·n 'who, someone' and kwé·kw 'what.'

=== Particles ===
Particles are words that are invariant in shape, i.e. they do not occur with any inflectional prefixes or suffixes. Particles may have a wide variety of meanings, and any organization into semantic classes is arbitrary. Many particles correspond to English modifiers of various kinds: á·pwi 'early,' á·wi·s 'late,' lá·wate 'long ago.' Others correspond to English terms specifying a location: alá·mi 'inside,' awási· 'the other side of,' é·kwi· 'under.' Some correspond to English nouns or noun phrases: naláhi· 'Munceytown,' kóhpi· 'in the forest.' Some forms of numbers are particles: nkwə́ti 'one,' ní·ša 'two,' nxáh 'three.'

(a) Kóhpi· éew. 'He went to the forest.'

(a) Lá·wate kóhpi· éew. 'Long ago he went to the forest'

(a) Wsa·m á·wi·s, alá·mi éew 'Its too late, he went inside.'

=== Preverbs ===
Preverbs are modifiers that occur before verbs. Preverbs reflect a wide variety of meanings. By convention, a hyphen is written between a preverb and a following verb, or between a preverb and a following preverb in the case of a sequence of two or more preverbs.

(a) áhwi-šə̆wahá·səw 'it has a lot of salt on it.'

In a sequence of preverb(s) followed by a verb stem, any inflectional personal prefix attaches to the first preverb, as in the followinɡ example in which the personal prefix /nt-/ precedes /á·pwi-/ 'early.' Inflectional suffixes, if any, are attached to the verb stem, not to the preverb. Thus, the combination of a preverb with a verb stem creates an entity called a compound verb stem.

(a) ntá·pwi-á·mwi. 'I got up early.'

(a) ntá·pwi-a·mwíhna. 'We got up early.'

Independent words may intervene between a preverb and the verb it is linked to. In the following example the pronoun kwé·k 'something, what' appears between the preverb á·lə- 'be unable to' and the verb lə́num 'do something.'

(a) á·lə- kwé·k –lə́num. 'He can't do anything.'

Sequences of two or more preverbs are possible. The preverbs are kí·š- 'be able' and kši- 'quickly.'

(a) ní· á · nkí·š-kši-kə́ntka 'I can dance fast.'

=== Prenouns ===
Prenouns are modifiers that occur before nouns. Prenouns are less common than preverbs. They express a wide variety of meanings. The prenoun connects to the noun it modifies using a hyphen. The prenoun itself has no gender. A prenoun may connect to a noun of either gender. The compound stem created by the prenoun-noun connection functions as one word such that prefixes for possession attach to the beginning of the preverb and suffixes attach to the end of noun.

(a) wə́ski·-pambí·l 'new book'

(a) mpambí·lə́m 'my book'

(a) no·ski·-pambí·lə́m 'my new book'

Animate Nouns with Prenouns
Prenoun	Meaning	Example	Translation
askí·-	raw	áski·-ohpən	raw potato
mači·-	bad	mačí·-skah·nsəw	a bad boy
maxki·-	red	máxki·-aní·xan	red shoelace
la·wé·wi·-	wild	la·wé·wi·-pehpé·tkwe·k	wild turnip
xə́wi·-	old	xə́wi·-pampí·lak	old books / pieces of paper

Inanimate Nouns with Prenouns
Prenoun	Meaning	Example	Translation
askí·-	raw	áski·-xwáskwi·m	raw corn
mači·-	bad	mačí·-mahksə́nal	bad shoes
maxki·-	red	máxki·-héempət	red shirt
la·wé·wi·-	wild	la·wé·wi·-wi·sakí·mal	wild grapes
xə́wi·-	old	xə́wi·-a·konkwé·epəy	old hat

== See also ==
- Delaware languages
