= Preverb =

Verb prefix in Caucasian languages

Although not used in general linguistic theory, the term preverb is used in Caucasian (including all three families: Northwest Caucasian, Northeast Caucasian and Kartvelian), Caddoan, Athabaskan, and Algonquian linguistics to describe certain elements prefixed to verbs. In the context of Indo-European languages, the term is usually used for separable verb prefixes.

Theoretically, any prefix could be called a preverbal element. However, in practice, the term preverb applies more narrowly in those families and refers to a prefixed element that is normally outside the premise of verbal morphology like locations of noun elements or, less often, noun elements themselves.

== Algonquian ==
In Algonquian languages, preverbs can be described as phonologically separate words that may precede a verb and share its inflection. In particular, pronominal prefixes or initial change are applied to the first preverb, if any, of the verb complex rather than to the verb stem. Their meaning can range from past tense or perfective aspect to meanings for which English might use an adverb or another verb, like these from Ojibwe:

Ojibwe	English	Comment
nibaa	he/she sleeps	has no preverb
ninibaamin	we sleep	likewise, with pronominal prefix
gii'-nibaa	he/she slept	has past tense preverb
ningii'-nibaamin	we slept	likewise, with pronominal prefix
gii'-maajii-nibaa	he/she started to sleep	has past preverb, and a lexical preverb
ningii'-maajii-nibaamin	we started to sleep	likewise, with pronominal prefix

In Munsee, some words can come between a preverb and its verb.

See also prenoun in such languages.

== Caddoan ==
In Caddoan linguistics, preverbal elements are less well defined as a class, and often, "preverb" designates a part of the verbal root that can be separated from the rest of the root by certain prefixes, as in this Wichita example:

ta- i- aa- tíísaas kir ri- ʔa -s
INDIC- 3SG- PVB- medicine liquid portative- come -IMPERF
He is bringing (liquid) medicine

== Northwest Caucasian languages ==
In Northwest Caucasian languages, they can have nouns, directional and locative preverbs (like prepositions), like in this example from Ubykh:

sɨ- bʁʲɜ- w- qʼɜ -nɜjtʼ
1SG- PVB- 2SG- talk -IMPERF
You were talking about me
(literally, 'you were talking on me')

== Mandarin Chinese ==
For Mandarin Chinese and many other varieties of Chinese, the term refers to some words that carry the meanings of prepositions in English. In Chinese, they are lexically verbs and appear before the noun in question. They are more commonly referred to as coverbs.

== Georgian ==
In Georgian, a Kartvelian language, the main function of a preverb is to distinguish the present tenses and the future tenses. To turn a present tense verb into a future tense, a preverb is added to the verb compound. In addition, preverbs also have directional meanings in Georgian.

Preverbs are directly attached to the beginning of the verb compound:

აკეთებს ak'etebs 'he does it' and გააკეთებს gaak'etebs 'he will do it'
ვწერ vts'er 'I am writing' and დავწერ davts'er 'I will write'

Note in those two examples that the meaning of the future tense is achieved only by adding the preverb; no other grammatical change occurs. In these examples, preverbs have directional meanings:

მოდის modis 'he/she is coming'
მიდის midis 'he/she is going'
ადის adis 'he/she is going up (the stairs), he/she is getting on (a bus)'
ჩამოდის chamodis 'he/she is arriving'
შემოდის shemodis 'he/she is entering'

Again, note that only the preverbs are changed to convey the meaning of various directional meanings.

Preverbs add directional meanings not only to the verbs of motion but also to any other kind of verbs. Compare the examples of the verb -ts'er- 'write':

დავწერე davts'ere 'I wrote it'
მოგწერე mogts'ere 'I wrote it to you'
მივწერე mivts'ere 'I wrote it to him/them'
გადაგიწერე gadagits'ere 'I wrote to you (from a place)'

As can be seen from the examples, the preverb changes according to the indirect object (the person for (to) whom the verb is being done).

Many verbs have a common root. For example, "end" and "stay" have the same verb root, -rch-. The meanings of the verbs are distinguished by their preverbs and other elements of the verb compound:

რჩება rcheba 'he is staying', დარჩება darcheba 'he will stay'
რჩება rcheba 'it is ending', მორჩება morcheba 'it will end'

As is clear, the verbs are identical in the present tense but differ in the future tense by their preverbs.

== Modern Persian ==
A preverb is a morpheme, which is applied together with the participles modifying their meaning and the meaning of their derivates.

Some Persian preverbs, referred to as "pīš fi'l" or "pīšvand e fi'l", are:

- bar (meaning up, upon, from Middle Persian abar)
- bar (meaning fruit, from Middle Persian bar)
- bar (bar meaning chest, side, direction, from Middle Persian war) and var (alternative form of bar)
- bāz
- far and fara
- farāz
- foru and forud
- ham and an
- ni
- go (e.g godāxtan, gozāštan, gorīxtan, etc...)
- negah and negāh
- pas
- piš
- ru
- sar
- vā
- andar and dar
- pay
- ā
- tar and tara
- par and para

Pre-verbs can modify the procedure attribute of the verbs and the infinitives, but they do not change their objective attribute:

.او کتابی داشت
U ketābi dāsht.
3.PN- book.DEF- have.PAST

.او کتابی را برداشت
U ketabi bar dāsht.
3.PN- book.DEF- PVB- have.PAST

The Pre-verb is normally positioned ahead of the verb. If the verb is composed of two separable components, the pre-verb is positioned ahead of the second component. The Pre-verb can be positioned at the end of the sentence, owing to versification requirements:

از کارِ خير عزمِ تو هرگز نگشت باز

هرگز زِ راه بازنگشته‌ست هيچ تير

Manuchehri (11th - 12th Century AD)

== Pingelapese ==
Pingelapese is a language spoken on the Island of Pingelap atoll, located in Micronesia. This language uses preverbs in existential sentences, one of their four sentence structures. The verb is used when a character of a story or statement is already known.

== Toki Pona ==
In the constructed language Toki Pona, a preverb is a class of words that can be placed at the start of the predicate in front of the verb. Toki Pona preverbs have various functions, such as marking grammatical mood or aspect.

Some examples:

mi ∅ wile moku
1.PN PM DES eat
I/we want to eat

o awen pona
OPT.PM CONT good
Stay good
(e.g. keep being well, may you stay healthy, etc.)

ona li ken ala kama sona e ni
3.PN PM POT NEG INCEP know DO DEM.PN
They aren't capable of learning this
(More literally: They can not come to know this)
