= Absentive aspect =

The absentive aspect was proposed in 2000 by the Dutch linguist Casper de Groot. It is a verbal form of aspect, and denotes that someone was not in a particular place at the time that they were performing some activity.

It is found in the German, Frisian, Dutch, Hungarian, Italian, Norwegian, Swedish, Finnish, and Catalan languages, among others.

== Qualities ==
The absentive expresses the concept of absence grammatically. In order to be able to be classified as absentive, an utterance must express:

- that someone was not in a given location (e.g. their home or office);
- that they were performing a continuous activity for a limited period of time (e.g. shopping, swimming, jogging);
- that they will return to the given location within the foreseeable future, when they have finished their activity — that is, they have not permanently left that place;
- the construction must be able to express this absence without needing additional lexical information, like 'away', 'out of the house'.

A typical example is when someone asks about someone else, but they are currently out shopping. The question about the person's whereabouts can be answered with the absentive. It is also possible to describe oneself through an absentive construction.
