= Mansi =

Mansi may refer to:

- Mansi people, an Indigenous people of Russia
  - Mansi language
- Mansi (name), given name and surname
- Mansi Junction railway station
- Mansi Township, Myanmar
  - Mansi, Myanmar, a town in the Kachin State of Myanmar (Burma)
- Mansi, Banmauk, a village in Sagaing Region, Myanmar (Burma)
- Lake Mansi
- Villa Mansi

== See also ==
- Al-Mansi (disambiguation)
- Minsi (disambiguation)
