= John Mansi =

John Mansi may refer to:

- John Louis Mansi (1926–2010), British television and film actor
- John Domenico Mansi (1692–1769), Italian prelate, theologian, scholar and historian
