= Ri-verbs =

In Icelandic grammar, the ri-verbs (Icelandic: ri-sagnir) are the four verbs in the language that have a -ri suffix in the past tense as opposed to a suffix containing a dental consonant such as /d/, /ð/, or /t/. Along with the preterite-present verbs (e.g. kunna and eiga), they are the only verbs which inflect with a mixed conjugation

== Overview ==
The verbs are gróa ("to heal, to grow"), núa ("to rub, to wipe"), róa ("to row") and snúa ("to turn").

The principal parts of the ri-verbs are as following:

| First principal part | Second principal part | Third principal part |
| Infinitive | First person singular past tense indicative mood | Past participle |
|---|---|---|
| Að snúa ("to turn") | Ég sneri or snéri ("I turned") | Ég hef snúið ("I have turned") |
| Að gróa ("to heal") | Ég greri or gréri ("I healed") | Ég hef gróið ("I have healed") |
| Að núa ("to rub") | Ég neri or néri ("I rubbed") | Ég hef núið ("I have rubbed") |
| Að róa ("to row") | Ég reri or réri ("I rowed") | Ég hef róið ("I have rowed") |

The spelling sneri reflects the original pronunciation of these words, while snéri reflects the modern pronunciation. The Icelandic Ministry of Education considers both variants to be equally correct.

== Origin ==
Historically, róa and snúa belonged to the seventh class of "strong" (irregular) verbs, which was the only class of verbs in Germanic that had retained the reduplication inherited from the Proto-Indo-European perfect aspect. In Old Norse, the verb sá ("to sow") also belonged to this group, but it has become regular in Modern Icelandic. The past tense of these three verbs from Proto-Germanic and Proto-North-Germanic was as follows:

- *rōaną ("to row") - *rerō ("I rowed")
- *snōaną ("to turn") - *sesnō > *seznō ("I turned")
- *sēaną ("to sow") - *sesō > *sezō ("I sowed")

Originally, all conjugation class 7 verbs showed this reduplication. In most verbs containing -ē- in the stem, this changed to -ō- through a process known as ablaut, which was common to all strong verbs. The change from s- to z- was due to Verner's law, a historical sound change in the Proto-Germanic language whereby voiceless fricatives were voiced when immediately following an unstressed syllable in the same word. Given that reduplicating prefix was originally unaccented, this caused voicing of /s/ to /z/. In Old Norse, this -z- was rhotacized to -r-, creating the following forms:

- róa ("to row") - røra, rera ("I rowed")
- snúa ("to turn") - snøra, snera ("I turned")
- sá ("to sow" < *sáa) - søra, sera ("I sowed")

The forms with ø were older and resulted from a vowel rounding process (u-umlaut) caused by word-final -ō, which became -u in Old Norse before it was deleted altogether. Following this, the verbs adopted the endings of irregular verbs in the past tense, with -a, -ir, -i in the first, second and third person singular past, and later the original vowel e was restored. The verbs gróa and gnúa (núa in modern Icelandic) were adapted to the forms of róa and snúa by analogy, although they did not begin with s- or r- (their past tenses in Germanic were *gegrō and presumably *gegnō).

In modern Icelandic, the first person singular ending was replaced by -i in all weak verbs, and the ri-verbs followed suit. The verb sá then eventually became weak, reducing the number of ri-verbs to the current four.

== See also ==
- A list of the ri-verbs on Wiktionary
