= Muncey =

Muncey is a surname. Notable people with the surname include:

- Bill Muncey (1928–1981), American hydroplane racer
- Cameron Muncey (born 1980), Australian musician
- George Muncey (1835–1883), English cricketer

== See also ==
- Chuck Muncie (1953–2013), American football player
- Muncy (disambiguation), includes list of people with surname Muncy
- Munsey (disambiguation), includes a list of people with surname Munsey
