= Al-Mansi (disambiguation) =

Al-Mansi was a depopulated Palestinian village.

Al-Mansi may also refer to:

- Mohamed Mansi Qandil (Mohamed al-Mansi Qandil)
- Yousef al-Mansi

== See also ==
- Ayn al-Mansi, depopulated Palestinian village
