= Minsi =

Minsi may refer to several articles:

- Lenape Minsis, phratry of the Lenape - also been referred to as Munsi, Munsee, Monsi, and Muncey.
- Camp Minsi, Scout camp
- The Minsi Trail, also known as Bethlehem Pike
- Minsi Trails Council, Boy Scout Council
- Mount Minsi, a hill on the Pennsylvania side of Delaware Water Gap

== See also ==
- Mansi (disambiguation)
