= Dorothy Davids =

Native American educator and activist (1923–2014)

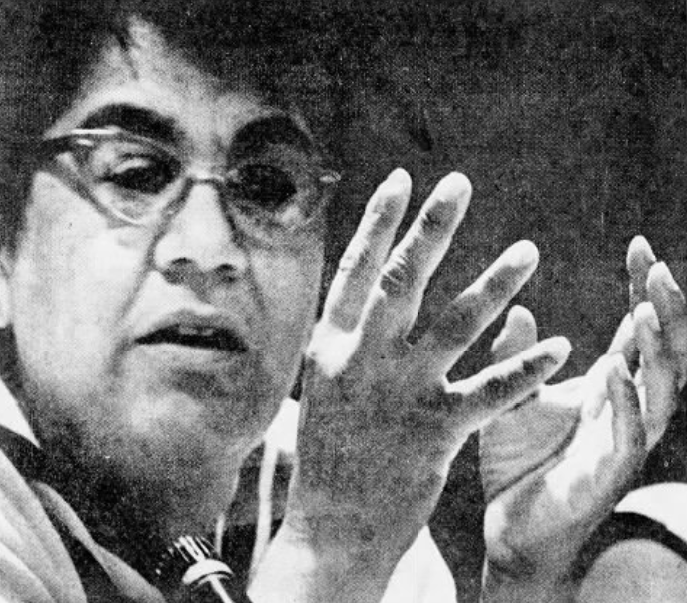
- Davids speaking at a 1968 conference
- Born: Dorothy Winona Davids; May 2, 1923; Red Springs, Wisconsin
- Died: October 4, 2014 (aged 91); Bowler, Wisconsin
- Occupations: Educator, education services administrator, Native American and women's rights activist
- Years active: 1961–2013
- Partner: Ruth Gudinas

Dorothy Davids (May 2, 1923 – October 4, 2014) was an American educator, educational services administrator, and a Native American and women's rights activist. She was an enrolled member of the Stockbridge–Munsee Community. Born in Red Springs, Wisconsin, she attended school in the Native American boarding school system. These schools did not allow students to speak their Native languages or practice their cultural traditions and focused on assimilating Indigenous people into mainstream society.

After graduating from Bowler High School she studied at Central State Teacher's College (now the University of Wisconsin–Stevens Point). The first Native American student to graduate from Stevens Point, she earned teaching credentials in 1945. At the time, although there was a teacher shortage, she had difficulty in finding a position and had to agree to lower pay to secure a job.

After 16 years of teaching, Davids received her master's degree in education and human development from the University of Wisconsin–Milwaukee in 1961. She worked for a summer at the National Congress of American Indians and then was awarded a John Hay Whitney fellowship for post-graduate studies at the University of Chicago. In Chicago, she joined the intertribal efforts for Native American rights, participating in conferences and workshops. She worked as a counselor at the American Indian Center and as a recruiter for the Upward Bound program at Mundelein College. While in Chicago, she met her life partner Ruth Gudinas, a nun from New York. Returning to Wisconsin in 1965, Davids worked for several community initiatives of the University of Wisconsin–Madison, before being hired as coordinator of outreach services for the University of Wisconsin Cooperative Extension. In her tenured position at the university, she worked on building bridges between Native people and mainstream society. She conducted educational seminars for women's groups, state and local governments, and various NGOs to create awareness about Native cultures and to advocate for Native self-determination. She also worked with the Stockbridge–Munsee Community leadership on initiatives to preserve their history and culture, such as the creation of the Arvid E. Miller Memorial Library and Museum in 1974.

In addition to her educational services administration work, Davids worked on projects for the 1976 Bicentennial under sponsorship from the Bureau of Indian Affairs and Smithsonian Institution. She spent a year as director of the Center for Racial Justice at the New York City YWCA. She co-chaired the state Advisory Council on Women’s Initiatives and served several terms on the state board for Indian Language and Culture Education. Retiring in 1985, Davids and Gudinas operated an educational consultation business called Full Circle. The organization worked to produce educational curricula that would foster pacifism and diversity. Davids served as tribal historian and chair of the tribe's historical committee. She helped found Muh-he-con-neew Press, as the publication arm of the committee. She received numerous awards from educational and community organizations during her lifetime, including having a room named after her at the University Center on the Stevens Point campus. The property on which she and Gudinas lived in their later life was purchased by the tribe in 2014 and named the Dorothy Davids and Ruth Gudinas Woodland Reserve, in the couple's honor.

== Early life and education ==
Dorothy Winona Davids was born on May 2, 1923, in Red Springs, Shawano County, Wisconsin, to Eureka (née Jourdan) and Elmer Davids. Her parents and all their children were enrolled members of the Stockbridge–Munsee Community. Her grandfather, William Davids, and grandmother, Martha Jourdan (also Jordan), were allotees, meaning that under the Treaty with the Stockbridge and Munsee of 1856, their rights to community lands had been revoked and they accepted personal ownership of 80 acres of land in Wisconsin, which was held in trust by the United States, and which they were unable to sell. The family lost their home to foreclosure during the Great Depression. Davids was a student at the Red Springs Lutheran Mission School school in Gresham, Wisconsin. The school was one of the Native American boarding schools, which aimed to assimilate Indigenous children and did not allow them to speak their native language or practice their cultural traditions. Later, she studied at the Lakeside School and Shawano Community High School, before graduating in 1941 from Bowler High School. She went on to further her education at the Central State Teacher's College, now the University of Wisconsin–Stevens Point. She attended university with a scholarship provided by the Bureau of Indian Affairs (BIA). She graduated in 1945, as the first Native American student to earn a degree at the school.

== Career ==
As the BIA had funded her education, there was an expectation, which she rejected, that Davids would teach at a reservation school. Instead, she applied to 14 different schools before being accepted to teach a fifth- and sixth-grade class in St. Croix Falls. Despite a teacher shortage at the time, she had to agree to a lower salary than other teachers and her contract specified that she had to gain community acceptance. She was recruited two years later to work for the Ashland School District. In 1949, Davids accepted a post to teach English for ninth graders at West Allis Junior High School, where she remained for 12 years. During this time, she wrote a textbook, Teacher Had Some Little Lambs, a creative writing primer. After 16 years of teaching, in 1961, she earned a master's degree in education and human development from the University of Wisconsin–Milwaukee.

Davids spent the summer of 1961 working in Washington, D.C. for the National Congress of American Indians, and was awarded a John Hay Whitney fellowship to complete post-graduate studies at the University of Chicago. In Chicago, she joined the Pan-Indian Movement, participating in the American Indian Chicago Conference in June, where the participants drafted the Declaration of Indian Purpose. She was one of the student participants in the 1962 Workshop on American Indian Affairs, organized by anthropologists Robert Knox Thomas (Cherokee) and Robert Rietz. She began working at the American Indian Center in Chicago as a counselor, and lived at the International House of Chicago. At the center, she was a problem solver, helping urban Natives with rent, transportation, clothing for work, and other services. In 1963, she met Ruth Gudinas, a nun from the Sisters of Saint Joseph convent in Rochester, New York. At the time, Gudinas was known as Sister Mary de Montfort and had just moved into the international house to complete her PhD studies at the University of Chicago. The two women quickly became friends.

In 1964, Davids became a minority student recruiter for the Upward Bound program at Mundelein College in Chicago. The following year, she returned to Wisconsin and began working in the Vista Program at the University of Wisconsin–Madison. She then worked at the university's Center for Action and Poverty before becoming a specialist with the Center for Community Leadership. She also taught continuing education courses for women at the University of Wisconsin Cooperative Extension, which hired her full-time in 1966. In her tenured university career, which spanned 20 years, Davids coordinated outreach efforts to bring awareness of the customs and culture of diverse groups of people, including Native Americans, into discussions and educational forums. A committed pacifist, along with mental health and social services specialists, she gave presentations on conflict resolution and ways to teach people, focusing on raising children and peaceful coexistence. Her goal was to work with Native organizations, county and town administrations, and women's groups, to create partnerships utilizing university resources to give Native communities the tools to make their own programs and policies. In 1972, Gudinas decided to leave the convent. Davids came and drove her from New York to her home in Wisconsin. The two women became life-long partners and collaborators. One of their projects resulted in the publication of a learning guide in 1979 evaluating the historical record about Thanksgiving. Their findings uncovered that the dinner between the Plymouth Pilgrims and Indigenous people was not part of the historic archive, but rather a 19th-century romanticized invention.

In addition to her work as an educator, Davids was involved in both governmental and tribal affairs. As chair of the tribal historical museum committee, she helped the tribe establish the Arvid E. Miller Memorial Library and Museum in 1974. In 1975 and 1976, she worked on a project sponsored by the BIA and Smithsonian Institution to have young tribal members throughout the United States make a video archive of the cultural activities of their communities. She traveled from the North Central part of the country to Alaska to help students make videotapes for the 1976 Bicentennial. As she explained, Native people did not celebrate the Bicentennial to honor what had been done to their people, but rather to remind non-Native Americans that Indigenous people were sovereign nations and that treaties with them had been broken. Davids took a sabbatical in 1978, to head the Center for Racial Justice at the YWCA in New York City. She was co-chair of the Advisory Council to the governor on women's initiatives in the 1970s, and in the 1980s served multiple terms on the state's Indian Language and Culture Educational Board.

Davids and Gudinas bought the home on Big Lake Road near the historic Stockbridge reservation, which Davids' parents had previously lost to foreclosure in 1985. In their retirement, they operated an educational consultation service from the farm called Full Circle. The goal of the organization was to host retreats and create curricula to provide multicultural perspectives for education. Davids served as tribal historian and chair of the tribal historical committee. She wrote a regular newspaper column for the tribal newspaper, Mohican News. She and Gudinas established a publishing company, Muh-he-con-neew Press, for the historical committee to publish children's literature and cultural writings. In 1999, a room at the University Center on the Stevens Point campus was named in Davids's honor. In July 2014, the Tribal Council of the Stockbridge-Munsee Community Band of Mohicans purchased Davids and Gudinas' home and renamed the property the Dorothy Davids and Ruth Gudinas Woodland Reserve. In her later years, Gudinas developed Alzheimer's disease and from 2013, she was cared for at the Ella Besaw Center of the Stockbridge-Munee Community. She died there on September 5, 2014.

== Death and legacy ==
Davids survived Gudinas for only a month, dying on October 4, 2014, at the Ella Besaw Center in Bowler, Wisconsin. She was selected for inclusion in the Wisconsin Women Making History project, founded in 2015, which aims to highlight women's historic contributions in the state. She is remembered for her contributions in creating curricula, which included Native perspectives, "for and about Native people". Her outreach work, focus on Native American women, and pacifism were recognized by numerous awards, including the 2009 Friend of Education Award from the Wisconsin Department of Public Instruction and later the Lifelong Educator Award from the University of Wisconsin Board of Regents.

== Selected works ==
- Davids, Dorothy W.; Gudinas, Ruth A. (1979). Student Activities and Teacher Materials for Use during the Thanksgiving Season. Madison, Wisconsin: Madison Metropolitan School District. OCLC 41677782.
- Davids, Dorothy W. (2001). Brief History of the Mohican Nation, Stockbridge-Munsee Band. Bowler, Wisconsin: Arvid E. Miller Memorial Library Museum. OCLC 48193615.
- Davids, Dorothy W. (2007). Inner Dreams and Outer Circles. Gresham, Wisconsin: Muh-he-con-neew Press. ISBN 978-0-935790-09-2.
- Davids, Dorothy W. (2008). The Mohican People: Their Lives and Their Lands, A Curriculum for Grades Four-Five. Gresham, Wisconsin: Muh-he-con-neew Press. ISBN 978-0-935790-10-8.
