= American Indian boarding schools in Wisconsin =

There were ten American Indian boarding schools in Wisconsin that operated in the 19th and 20th centuries. The goal of the schools was to culturally assimilate Native Americans to European–American culture. This was often accomplished by force and abuse. The boarding schools were run by church, government, and private organizations.

== Hayward Indian Boarding School ==
The Hayward Indian Boarding School, located in Hayward, Wisconsin, was established on September 1, 1901 as a school predominantly for the Chippewa (Ojibwe) of the Lac Courte Oreille Reservation. The boarding school was operated and funded by the government on Christian values for over three decades. In 1923, it housed a total of 1309 individuals: 251 boys under age 20, 232 girls under age 17, 386 men aged 20 and over, and 440 women aged 17 years and older (see Student Population 1923 table).

Robert Laird McCormick, owner of the North Wisconsin Lumber Company, was an influential figure at the boarding school. McCormick pushed for the school to be built in Hayward, and published the article, "Many Reasons Why the US Government Indian School Should be Located on Section 15-41-9, near Hayward, Wis." in 1898. The school eventually closed in 1934 during the Great Depression due to its being underfunded, understaffed, and overcrowded. A 2024 report by the Department of the Interior stated that they had identified at least three students who died during their time at the school.

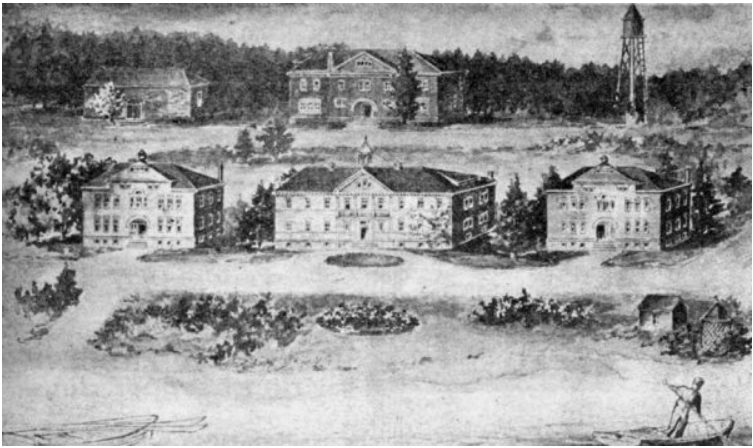
A drawing of the Hayward Indian Boarding School, which was published in 1900, by an unknown author.

	Minors	Adults	Total
Male	251	386	637
Female	232	440	672
Total	483	826	1309

=== Quality of life ===
The school was chronically underfunded, overcrowded, and inadequately staffed. Overpopulation, poor sanitary conditions, unclean water, inconsistent heating, and imperfect sewage and ventilation systems caused diseases to be common among students. The Hayward Indian School Hospital had a capacity for treating eleven patients at a time, with limited care options. It was the only hospital within ten miles and was responsible for more than a thousand residents on the reservation. It had a high mortality rate among its patients because of the limited care options and size.

=== Everyday life ===
At the Hayward Indian Boarding School, students were forced to assimilate to a more Christian lifestyle. Native Americans were compelled to leave behind the ideas of their own beliefs and to learn the ideas of Christianity. Staff cut the students' hair and changed their names to English-language ones. Students lived a military or regimented routine, where they were given school uniforms to wear and followed a strict schedule, regulated by bells. In addition, the students marched and drilled daily.

The people who ran the school thought these practices would produce faster assimilation. The purpose of the school was not just to teach students a skilled trade but was also a way to teach students Christian beliefs. Students who attended the Hayward Indian School had to adapt to European-American culture. Graduation rates were low due to poor academics. Most students had never seen or used many common American utensils, such as silverware. Along with learning American culture, students were allowed to participate in extracurricular sports, such as basketball, baseball, and football. However, in the 1920s these activities were discontinued, due to lack of funding.

== Oneida Boarding School ==
The Oneida Boarding School, located on the Oneida Reservation in Oneida, Wisconsin, operated from 1893 to 1918. In 1887, the United States government planned to establish a boarding school on the Oneida reservation as an incentive for the Oneida Nation to accept the subdivision of land according to the Dawes General Allotment Act of 1887. The Oneida Boarding School opened on March 27, 1893, after one year of construction. By 1899 the Oneida Boarding School enrolled 131 students and 5 staff members in attendance.

Children could attend school on this 151-acre site at no monetary cost to the parents. The curriculum focused mainly on skills such as those needed for farming and housekeeping, as the area was rural. The school prohibited students from speaking their native language, so students who did not understand any English hid from supervisors in order to speak freely and avoid whippings.

In 1907, Dennison Wheelock's proposal turned the boarding school into a day school. Due to financial issues, the school closed in 1918 after the United States entered World War I. Some Oneida parents protested, as they wanted to maintain formal US government educational opportunities for their children.

In 1924, the school was purchased by the Catholic Diocese of Green Bay. It reopened the institution as a boarding school for both boys and girls, named the Guardian Angel Boarding School.

It was closed in 1954 and adapted for use as the Sacred Heart Seminary for training Catholic priests. The seminary operated for two decades.

In 1976, after passage of the Indian Self-Determination and Education Assistance Act, the Oneida Nation leased the space from the diocese. They opened their own education office in the school buildings and contracted with the BIA to manage the education of their children. In 1984 the Oneida took total ownership of the school site by purchasing it from the Diocese of Green Bay. They renamed the facility as the Norbert Hill Center.

In 2024, a report from the Department of the Interior stated that at least two children who died during their time at the school between 1893 and 1919 had been identified.

=== Superintendents ===
Sent to Oneida in 1892 by the Commissioner of Indian Affairs to oversee the construction of the buildings, Charles F. Pierce was the first superintendent of the Oneida Government Boarding school. He served in that position from 1893 to 1899. During this time, his wife was also involved in developing the school as a teacher-administrator. She supervised five teachers at the school: Lucy P. Hart, Alice Cornelius, Mary E. Bonifant, Mary M. Shirk, and Moses E. King. Additionally, other job positions included matron, seamstress, laundress, cook, farmer, engineer, nurse, and night watchman.

Following Pierce, Joseph C. Hart became the Indian Agent for the Oneida in 1898 and was appointed superintendent of the school in 1900. Throughout his tenure as superintendent, controversies and suspicions led to numerous investigations into his leadership.

Hart kept detailed reports of daily life at the Oneida Boarding School which described the school and student body. Students attended the school for ten months of the year. Under Hart's watch, boys were taught agricultural skills such as gardening, maintaining livestock, and using tools; while girls were taught domestic tasks like cooking, cleaning, and other household chores.

=== Outing System ===
As an extension of the boarding school system, Native American students were encouraged to work in the households of white families during the summer. This arrangement was called the outing system and originated at the Carlisle Indian Industrial School. This practice was meant to promote further assimilation into Euro-American culture and prevent Native Americans from participating in their culture while they were not in school.

The work they completed for white families was often related to farming, which was prevalent in the area. Students tended to crops and livestock. In addition to the Americanization of the Oneida children, the outing system was meant to discipline students. If students broke rules imposed by their host families, they were subject to severe punishments, such as whipping. This strict lifestyle change forced the students to quickly adapt to their new environments, and they were cut off from their own cultures.

Some students lived in white families' homes while they attended school. On many occasions, during the winter season, Oneida children had the option to attend public school. They would be allowed to stay with a white family for room and board. In exchange for this, the children would work for the family before and after school.

== Saint Joseph's Indian Industrial School ==
The Menominee Indian boarding school, also known as Saint Joseph's Indian Industrial school, was an American Indian boarding school built on the Menominee Indian reservation in Keshena, Wisconsin, in 1883. It operated until 1952. In 1899 the school consisted of 170 students and 5 staff. Many of its students were from the Menominee Nation but the school challenged their culture and traditions.

The school was run by the Keshena Indian Agency. The agency was used as a way to communicate with the Native Americans. According to the 1932 statistical report, school lands took up four-hundred-forty acres of land out of a total of five-hundred-five acres under jurisdiction by the agency. A 2024 report from the Department of the Interior stated that they had identified at least one child who died during their time as a student.

=== Religion's role in Saint Joseph's founding ===
In the early 1800s, the Menominee were visited by Catholic missionaries who established a mission with them. Over time, many members converted to Catholicism. After some time, Menominee on the reservation were largely Catholic.

In the early 1840s, Catholic priest Father Bonduel was assigned to the reservation to support religious tribal goals. Bonduel decided to leave the reservation after settling a direct exchange of land, benefiting the Menominee. Shortly after this negotiation and Bonduel's departure, the Franciscan Order took over the schooling system on the reservation.

Once the Franciscan Order took over, there were conflicts between the Indian Office (Bureau of Indian Affairs) and the Franciscan Order. Through the dispute, the Indian Office within the Bureau of Indian Education discouraged further conversions to Catholicism. The Indian Office officials were concerned about the influence of Catholic priests in the culture of the reservation, as the majority of official staff represented Protestant America. They wanted to ensure that the Catholics were not encouraging support among the Menominee for a "foreign Pope." Due to this dispute, the Franciscan Order wanted to maintain control over schooling. The boarding school was constructed on the Menominee reservation in 1883: Saint Joseph's Indian Industrial School. The Indian Office stopped allowing clergy and nuns to teach in the boarding schools. They ordered following the model created at the Carlisle Indian School after 1879 by Richard Henry Pratt.

=== History of Saint Joseph's Indian Industrial School ===
==== Early history ====
When forced to live on the Menominee reservation around 1852, the Menominee tribal members tried to adapt to a new way of life, but they found the advice from the federal officials ineffective. The Menominee were interested in the US State government education system and were willing to try agriculture and education if the US federal government would end the harsh life forced upon them by being restricted on a small reservation.

By 1870, the US federal government regularly began to provide education funding for tribal reservations, even when no treaty stipulations required it to do so. This funding would either go to government- or mission-operated schools. Over the next decade, the issues that arose between the Menominee Nation and the U.S officials over the implementation of boarding schools had some sort of religious component to them. The priest did not support the boarding schools and as a result threatened to shun them from his church.

After a U.S. federal government inspector visited the reservation in the summer of 1876, they recommended a manual labor boarding school in Keshena, Wisconsin. The government decided to found a school to fulfill this vision: The manual labor schools supplemented academic activity with agricultural and mechanical work. When the school first opened, the priest on the reservation said he would expel any church members who decided to send their children to the government schools because he did not support the idea of boarding schools and having kids adapt to the American lifestyle. As a result of this, only two students attended the boarding school during the years 1878 to 1880. The federal government told the priest that he would not be allowed to minister to Native Americans if he opposed parents enrolling their children in the boarding school.

In order to remain on the reservation, the priest no longer took action against parents for sending their children to the school. Some 102 students signed up for school, with an average attendance of 76 students. The tribe approved spending six thousand dollars to construct a new building. These changes began a new era in Menominee schooling which would last well into the twentieth century. An increased number of Menominee children attended boarding schools, but most did so on the reservation in Keshena rather than at an off-reservation school.

==== Mid-history ====
The Browning Ruling, in effect from 1896 to 1902, severely affected Saint Joseph's. It determined that the Office of Indian Affairs had the final say in where Native American students could attend school. At the same time, as a mission school, Saint Joseph's was struggling financially as a mission school. In 1897 a clause added to the federal Indian appropriations bill forbade government funding of non-secular schools. Saint Joseph's was forced to accept more Native American students than they could afford to support.

As part of the Browning Ruling, the federal government allowed Saint Joseph's to take an unconventional funding approach. In 1897, the government permitted the school to tap into the Menominee logging fund, which was a trust held by the government that contained money owed to the Menominee people from leases for logging on their land. The Commissioner of Indian Affairs insisted that the school send a yearly petition with tribal signatures that stated that they wanted the logging fees to be disbursed to the school, rather than to heads of households in the tribe, as was originally the case. the original per-capita plan.

Many Menominee tribal members refused to sign the petition for numerous reasons. They relied on the logging fees for money to help them buy goods and survive the winter. They also objected to the initial wording of the petition, which suggested that those who signed the petition would receive a reduced disbursement from the logging fees. To address this, the wording was changed such that all members of the Menominee tribe would experience a reduced disbursement. School administrators would also attempt to get the needed signatures by refusing to bury or threatening to excommunicate those who did not sign. Issues related to the annual petition seeking funding would last until the end of Saint Joseph's operations in 1952.

==== Late history ====
Over the years, Saint Joseph's was a favored landmark of most Menominee on this reservation. In 1933 Father Engelhard wrote that the school and Catholic Church had unanimous support in the community. It became easier for the church to acquire the necessary number of signatures for the annual petition.

In 1933, the Menominee tribe petitioned the federal government and the new presidential administration for Saint Joseph's to be merged with the government boarding school, as they found it easier to work with Saint Joseph's than the Indian Agency. Because of this merger, the school gained more funding, alleviating its financial struggles. Following the merger, Ralph Fredenberg (Menominee), a Catholic, was appointed as an Indian agent in 1934 by John Collier, Commissioner for the Office of Indian Affairs under President Franklin D. Roosevelt.

Fredenberg advocated for Menominee economic self-sufficiency, as well as the preservation of their cultural uniqueness. However, tensions grew between Fredenberg and Saint Joseph's as Fredenberg advocated a transition from literary education to vocational education, as well as a transition from compulsory attendance to attendance based on demonstrated usefulness. In 1937, the school was inspected, and it was found that they had not done enough to comply with the shifts recommended by Fredenberg. It was also recommended that the number of students be decreased. The school failed to comply with inspection recommendations. In 1941 action Engelhard was replaced by Father Benno Tushaus. But the US entry into World War Two, and related logistical problems, resulted in major changes at the school being postponed. The government continued to press the school for changes.

In 1945, Tushaus attempted to address one of the issues raised by the inspection by requesting a school bus to pick up students who lived far from the school. The Office of Indian Affairs took this opportunity to transfer these students to a public school closer to where they lived. Tushaus objected to this effort, and, combined with "irreconcilable differences between him and the tribal government", Tushaus left the school in 1951.

When Father Belker assumed the role of administrator in January 1952, he closed the school, citing a shortage of teachers. Later he said that the Menominee no longer needed boarding schools. When the focus of boarding schools was the assimilation of Native Americans into American culture, the schools served a clear purpose. However, when the goal in the 1930s became economic self-sufficiency and self-determination, Belker felt that the boarding school had become obsolete.

== Tomah Indian Industrial School ==
The Tomah Indian Industrial School, which opened in 1893, was an off-reservation, government boarding school in Wisconsin located along a main railroad that connected Chicago, Milwaukee and St. Paul. It provided education for children from the Ho-Chunk Nation of Wisconsin, who were referred to at the time as the "Winnebago" by white settlers. The boarding school was the vision of white policy makers and administrators. As the first school of its kind to exist in Wisconsin, it was esteemed for its literary education and religious influences. Most students were members of the Ho-Chunk Nation, but the school also served Ojibwe, Oneida and Menominee students from reservations in Wisconsin. A 2024 report from the Department of the Interior stated that they had identified at least one child who died during their time as a student.

=== Characteristics of the school ===
Guidelines for how the school was to be run were largely based on Euro-American culture and aimed at "Americanizing" the students. These guidelines were followed by giving the students English names and teaching them English and cultural practices, having them attend church regularly, and teaching them Christian values. The Tomah Indian Industrial School also incorporated manual labor as part of industrial learning. More advanced students were placed on nearby farms to perform manual labor while living with families with whom they could improve their English. Subjects that were offered in the school included religious practices, social life, music, athletics, and military training. Classes went through 8th grade and excluded kindergarten. At this time, there were few public high schools in the United States. Most students taking class above the eighth grade level were in private seminaries or academies. Schoolwork was set along the limits required by the Commission of Indian Affairs.

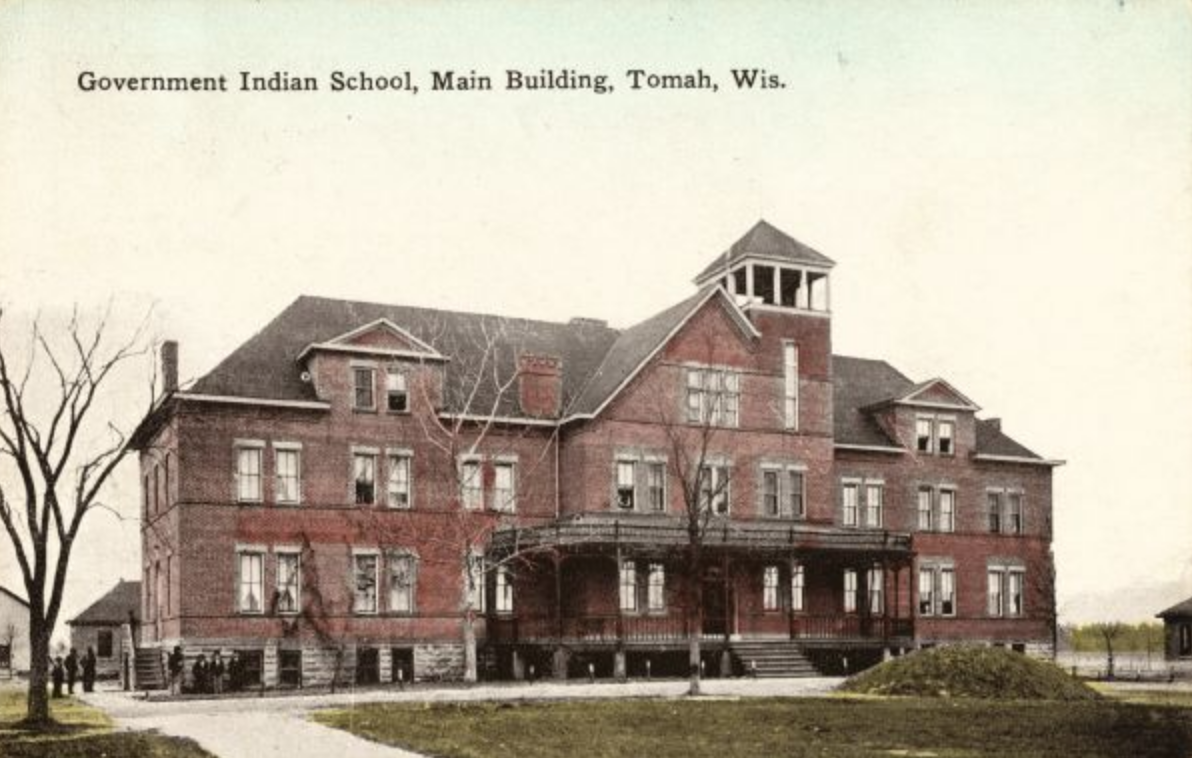
Tomah Indian School main building

=== Daily life ===
In 1896, daily life in the Tomah Indian Industrial School followed a strict routine. The boys generally took care of manual labor such as farming operations, managing stock, and carpentry. The girls received lessons on domestic duties, including but not limited to sewing, cooking, and laundry.

The sewing room was the space most frequently attended by the girls. By the end of the school year, each girl in the sewing class would be able to take a piece of cloth and make a dress for any child without any help. The girls were taught long and short stitch embroidery as well.

Divine services (church) were attended by all the students in the city of Tomah on Sunday afternoons. The superintendent conducted Sabbath school at 2 p.m., which was attended by all students and faculty members.

=== A model for other Indian boarding schools ===
Over 2,000 students were admitted during the operating years of the Tomah Indian Industrial School. The school was known for diminishing the Native American children's cultural background and making them more Americanized. The school had goals that were reflective of the educational goals of white administrators and policy makers of the time. Examples of how these goals were achieved included religious conversions, celebrations of U.S. federal holidays, attending regular church services, learning patriotic and folk music, giving different names to the children, and learning English. The school was well-liked by the U.S. Department of the Interior. Tomah Indian Industrial School was seen as a model for how other schools at the time could develop.

== List of Native American boarding schools in Wisconsin ==
- St. Mary's Indian Boarding School, Bad River Reservation, Odanah, run by Catholic Franciscan Sisters of Perpetual Adoration
- Bayfield Boarding School, Bayfield
- Bethany Mission, Wittenberg
- The Red Springs Indian Mission, Gresham
- Good Shepherd Industrial School, Milwaukee
- Hayward Indian Boarding School, Hayward
- St. Joseph's Industrial School, Keshena, operated by the Diocese of Green Bay
- Lac du Flambeau Government Boarding School
- Oneida Boarding School, Oneida Reservation, Oneida
- Tomah Indian Industrial School, Tomah
- Winnebago Indian Mission School of the Evangelical and Reformed Church (now part of the United Church of Christ), off-reservation, first near Black River Falls; moved to Neillsville, Wisconsin, in 1921; supported by church contributions.

== See also ==
- American Indian outing programs
