= Red Springs =

Red Springs may refer to:

- Red Springs, North Carolina
- Red Springs, Texas
- Red Springs, Wisconsin

== See also ==
- Red Spring, West Virginia
