= Ruth Gudinas =

American educator and activist

- Born: 9 December 1931; Rochester, New York
- Died: 5 September 2014 (aged 82) in Bowler, Wisconsin
- Education: Nazareth College; University of Chicago
- Occupations: Educator; Activist
- Partner: Dorothy Davids

Ruth Gudinas (9 December 1931–5 September 2014) was an American educator and activist. She was born in Rochester, New York, and completed her early education there. She received bachelor's and master's degrees in history from the Nazareth College. She later moved to Chicago to pursue her PhD at the University of Chicago. She became a Catholic nun in 1950 and left the religious order in 1972.

Gudinas met educator Dorothy Davids in Chicago during the early 1960s, and the two later became lifelong partners and collaborators. Gudinas left Rochester in 1972 and settled with Davids in Madison, Wisconsin. She worked as a school curriculum developer for the Madison Metropolitan School District for 17 years. She later co-founded Full Circle, an organization that developed curriculum materials and Muh-he-con-neew Press, a non profit organization that published several books and educational works about the Stockbridge–Munsee Community. Gudinas and Davids died within a month of each other in late 2014.

== Early life and education ==
Ruth Gudinas was born on 9 December 1931 in Rochester, New York to Louisa Guenther Gudinas (1897–1980) and William Henry Gudinas (1893–1977). Her mother was of German ancestry and her father was from Lithuania. She was the second child and had an older sister, Marie, born on 5 September 1929.

Gudinas did her schooling in Rochester. On 3 July 1950, at the age of 18, she became a Catholic nun in the Sisters of St. Joseph of Rochester and took the name Mary de Montfort. She received her bachelor and masters degrees in history from the Nazareth College. She moved to Chicago in 1963 to pursue a PhD at the University of Chicago. She met educator Dorothy Davids in Chicago during the early 1960s, and the two later became lifelong partners and collaborators.

Gudinas received her PhD in June 1974 and her thesis focused on the Native American political organization in Ho-Chunk Nation of Wisconsin. She later left the religious order of Sisters of St. Joseph of Rochester on 1 August 1972.

== Career ==
Gudinas began her career as a teacher at the St. Monica's school in Rochester in 1953, and taught at Mount Carmel High School in Auburn, New York from 1955 to 1962. She worked at the Nazareth Academy in Rochester briefly in 1962-63, and again in the early 1970s.

Gudinas left Rochester in 1972 and moved with Davids to Wisconsin. She took up a job as a part-time editor at Madison. She later became a school curriculum developer for the Madison Metropolitan School District (MMSD) and served in the position for 17 years. She developed curriculum materials and teacher training programs focused on multicultural education, and collaborated with community organizations on other educational initiatives.

Following her retirement from her role at the MMSD, Gudinas, along with Davids, co-founded Full Circle, an organization that developed multicultural curriculum resources and conducted educational programmes for teachers. The duo also co-founded Muh-he-con-neew Press, a non profit organization that published several books and educational works about the Stockbridge–Munsee Community.

== Later life and death ==
Since 1986, Gudinas and Davids lived in Gresham, Wisconsin. She developed Alzheimer's disease in her later years and died on 5 September 2014 at the age of 82 in Bowler, Wisconsin. Davids died one month later on 4 October 2014.

== Honours and legacy ==
Gudinas received several awards including the Madison Schools Distinguished Service Award (1986), the Wisconsin Outstanding Human Relations Educator of the Year (1988), and the Outstanding Organization Award from the Wisconsin State Human Relations Association (2004).

Following their deaths, the Stockbridge–Munsee Community designated their shared property as the Dorothy Davids and Ruth Gudinas Woodland Reserve.
