= Paul T. Fuhrman =

American farmer, businessman, and politician

Paul T. Fuhrman (May 10, 1883 – June 4, 1965) was an American farmer, businessman, and politician.

Born in the town of Fairbanks, Shawano County, Wisconsin, Fuhrman was a building contractor, in the lumber and retail hardware business, and farming. Fuhrman served as town chairman of Bartelme, Wisconsin 1912–1922, village president of Bowler, Wisconsin 1924-1932 and also served on the Shawano County Board of Supervisors. From 1927 until 1939, Fuhrman served in the Wisconsin State Assembly and was a Progressive. Fuhrman died in Tigerton, Wisconsin,
