= Robert Thomas =

Robert, Rob, Bob, or Bobby Thomas may refer to:

== Arts ==
- Robert Thomas (director) (1927–1989), French writer, actor and director
- Robert Thomas (sculptor) (1926–1999), Welsh sculptor
- Robert Thomas Jr., American jazz percussionist and hand drummer
- Robert Thomas, former bassist for the rock band Black Veil Brides
- Robert Thomas, known as Rob49, American rapper
- Rob Thomas (musician) (born 1972), lead singer of Matchbox Twenty
- Rob Thomas (writer) (born 1965), producer and screenwriter, creator of Veronica Mars
- Bobby Thomas (musician) (1932–2013), American jazz drummer
- Bob Thomas (actor) (born 1965), radio personality, actor, and writer
- Bob Thomas, founder member of Silly Wizard

== Journalism ==
- Robert Thomas (newspaper proprietor) (1781–1860), founder of the South Australian Register
- Robert McG. Thomas Jr. (1939–2000), American journalist
- Robert Kyffin Thomas (1851–1910), South Australian newspaper proprietor
- Robert Bailey Thomas (1766–1846), American publisher of the Old Farmers Almanac
- Bob Thomas (reporter) (1922–2014), American reporter for the AP covering Hollywood
- Rob Thomas, American newspaper editor The Capital Times

== Politics ==
- Sir Robert Thomas, 1st Baronet (1873–1951), Liberal member of parliament in Wales
- Sir Robert Thomas, 2nd Baronet (1622–?), MP for Cardiff, 1661–1681
- Robert J. Thomas (1945–2014), president and CEO of Nissan in the U.S. and Clinton administration appointee
- Lindsay Thomas (politician) (Robert Lindsay Thomas, born 1943), US representative from Georgia
- Robert R. Thomas (born 1952), chief justice of the Illinois Supreme Court, former NFL kicker
- Robert Y. Thomas Jr. (1859–1925), US representative from Kentucky
- Bob Thomas (Nevada politician) (1926–2013), American businessman, newspaper columnist, and politician
- Bob Thomas (Australian politician) (1954–2016), Western Australian politician
- Bob Thomas (Virginia politician) (born 1977), member of the Virginia House of Delegates
- Bob Thomas (Labour politician) (1901–2004), British politician and trade unionist

== Sports ==
=== American football ===
- Bob Thomas (running back) (born 1948), American football player
- Robb Thomas (born 1966), American football player
- Robert Thomas (fullback) (born 1974), American football player
- Robert Thomas (linebacker) (born 1980), American football player
- Robert Thomas (defensive lineman) (born 1991), American football player

=== Association football (soccer) ===
- Bob Thomas (footballer, born 1919) (1919–1990), English football player
- Bobby Thomas (footballer) (born 2001), English footballer

=== Other sports ===
- Bob Thomas (rugby union) (1871–1910), Wales international rugby player
- Bobby Thomas (cyclist) (1912–2008), American Olympic cyclist
- Bob Thomas (long jumper) (1939–2016), New Zealand long jumper
- Rob Thomas (rugby league) (born 1990), English rugby league footballer
- Robert Thomas (ice hockey) (born 1999), Canadian ice hockey player

== Other ==
- Robert Thomas (Ap Vychan) (1809–1880), known by the bardic name "Ap Vychan", a Welsh Independent minister and poet
- Robert K. Thomas (literary scholar) (1918–1998), English professor and academic vice president at BYU
- Robert K. Thomas (chemist) (born 1941), physical chemist
- Robert M. Thomas (1908–1984), American rubber scientist
- Robert George Thomas (1820–1883), draftsman and architect in the British colony of South Australia
- Robert Jermain Thomas (1839–1866), Christian missionary in Korea
- Robert Knox Thomas (1925–1991), American anthropologist
- Rob Thomas (scientist), South Australian environmental scientist and public servant
- Robert Thomas, 18th-century British counterfeiter, see Cragg Coiners
- Bob Thomas (programmer), creator of the computer worm Creeper

== See also ==
- Rod Thomas (disambiguation)
- Roy Thomas (disambiguation)
