= Lucille Jerry Winnie =

Seneca-Cayuga woman author and educator

- Born: 1905 (age 120–121); Oklahoma
- Education: Haskell Institute
- Occupations: Educator and author

Lucille "Jerry" Winnie (born 1905) was a Seneca-Cayuga author who wrote her autobiography, San-Gan-De-Oh: The Chief's Daughter, which detailed her life including her education at the federal boarding school for Native Americans, Haskell Institute. She worked as an educator in federal boarding schools and spent time dedicated to the education of Indigenous people.

== Biography ==
Lucille Jerry Winnie was born in 1905 in Oklahoma, and was raised on reservations in both Oklahoma and Montana. She was of Seneca and Cayuga heritage.

Her father was a teacher in the American Indian boarding schools, known for being an advocate for education. He often said, "In the Indian youth lies the hope of our people." He died when Winnie was 12 years old.

=== Education at Haskell Institute ===
After her father's death, she attended Haskell Institute, a government school in Lawrence, Kansas where her father attended. Since her father was a teacher, she was more familiar and more comfortable at the boarding school than other children. She played basketball with her peers. She worked for a teacher on Saturday mornings that paid her $1, which Winnie describes as a small fortune.

Despite her previous experience, she still suffered at boarding school. She was initially enthusiastic about attending the school, but was not allowed to share a room with her sister and wanted to go home immediately. An officer told the girls to remove their home clothes and put on official school clothes that looked like prison garb. The shoes hurt her feet and her bed was hard and cold. Haskell employed military discipline and she bucked against the strict regimen. She was never popular with the officers or matrons, and only earned the rank of "buck private." At least one of her brothers died because of overexertion on the track team. She was not entirely disillusioned, and later recognized the usefulness of the training she received for life in mostly white society.

=== Career ===
She attended Haskell for 7 years and graduated "with a high average." She won a scholarship to the University of Kansas, but instead became a teacher for the Indian Service. Winnie's position in the federal boarding school system was her attempt to support the welfare of Indigenous people. She maintained her cultural heritage and resisted assimilation, which helped her students find an anchor during their time at boarding schools. She was a teachers' assistant at Mount Pleasant Indian Industrial Boarding School. She joined the students playing basketball often, and became the varsity girls' team. Basketball became her sole responsibility.

After leaving teaching, she worked in government agencies and private business. She spent some time in the airline industry and worked for Howard Hughes, met Amelia Earhart, and holidayed in Hawaii. She described her education at Haskell for providing necessary skills that were "essential to our future."

She returned to the Northern Cheynne Reservation in Montana, and in 1963 she was director of arts and crafts. She helped people become economically independent through making and selling authentic Indian products.

=== Death and legacy ===
There is no information about Lucille Jerry Winnie's death.

== Published works ==
- Winnie, Lucille. San-Gan-De-Oh : The Chief's Daughter (1969).
