= Split Rock, Wisconsin =

- Unincorporated community
- Location within Wisconsin Location within the United States
- Coordinates: 44°42′18″N 89°01′33″W
- Country: United States
- State: Wisconsin
- County: Shawano
- Elevation: 965 ft (294 m)
- Time zone: UTC-6 (Central (CST))
  - Summer (DST): UTC-5 (CDT)
- Area codes: 715 & 534
- GNIS feature ID: 1574566

Split Rock (also Splitrock) is an unincorporated community located in the town of Fairbanks, Shawano County, Wisconsin, United States. Split Rock is located on County Highway SS near its junction with U.S. Route 45, 3 miles (4.8 km) southeast of Tigerton.

== History ==
A post office called Split Rock was established in 1889, and remained in operation until it was discontinued in 1935. The community was supposedly named for a nearby rock which had split in half.
