= St. Joseph's Catholic Church (Wilmington, Delaware) =

Historic church in Delaware, United States

- U.S. National Register of Historic Places
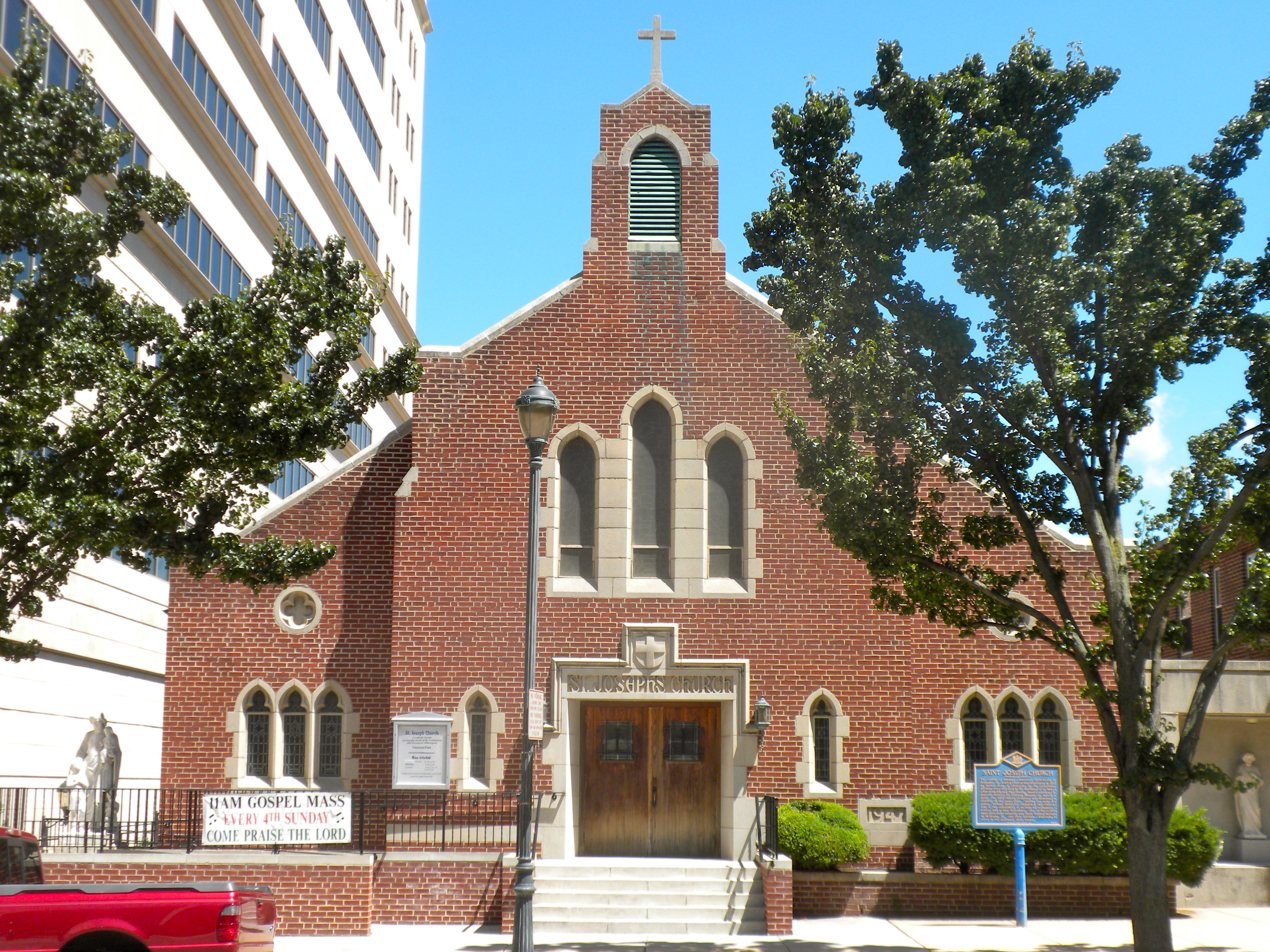
- St. Joseph's Catholic Church, June 2010

- Location within Delaware Location within the United States
- Location: 1012 French St., Wilmington, Delaware
- Coordinates: 39.745162°N 75.545374°W
- Area: less than one acre
- Built: 1947
- Architectural style: Late Gothic Revival
- NRHP reference No.: 03001385
- Added to NRHP: January 14, 2004

St. Joseph's Catholic Church is a historic Black Catholic church located at 1012 French Street in Wilmington, New Castle County, Delaware. It was added to the National Register of Historic Places in 2004.

== History ==
St. Joseph's was founded by the Josephites, who established community services for the Wilmington African-American community dating from the late-1880s.

It later changed hands, ending up with the Franciscans, who relinquished administration in Fall 2020 to the Diocese of Wilmington.

== Building ==
The current complex was built to replace the previous church and rectory destroyed by a fire in 1945. It was built in 1947, and is a 1 1/2-story, three-bay, brick and cast stone church building with a gable roof. It is in the late Gothic Revival style.

The rectory is a two-story, three-bay brick and cast stone building constructed in 1954. It is connected to the church by a one-story hyphen.

== See also ==
- St. Joseph's Industrial School: former Josephite school in Delaware
- National Register of Historic Places listings in Wilmington, Delaware
