= American Indian outing programs =

Native American work programs

Native American outing programs were associated with American Indian boarding schools in the United States. These were operated both on and off reservations, primarily from the late 19th century to World War II. Students from boarding schools were assigned to live with and work for European-American families, often during summers, ostensibly to learn more about English language, useful skills, and majority culture, but in reality, primarily as a source of unpaid labor. Many boarding schools continued operating into the 1960s and 1970s.

The boarding schools were established by law in 1891, and more were founded by the federal government in the early 20th century. Their goal was to educate Native American children to learn English, math, literacy, and European-American mainstream culture, though this was achieved by stripping children of their family and community ties, punishing children for speaking Native languages, and forcing them to live in a militarized fashion with harsh punishments for even inconsequential infractions. Those in charge of the program thought this to be necessary for the survival of Native Americans in modern American culture, though many--including Native people--disagreed.

Richard Henry Pratt developed the first such boarding school at the Carlisle Indian Industrial School in 1879, which became a model for the government program. He also developed the outing program. In 1891 the federal government authorized by law establishing other Indian boarding schools. By 1900, several other American Indian boarding schools in the west had begun federal outing programs modeled after that of Carlisle. These included schools in Salem, Oregon; Lawrence, Kansas; Riverside, California; Carson City, Nevada; and Albuquerque, New Mexico.

Most of the children involved in outing programs lived and worked with their assigned families for part of every day and often whole summers. Other children stayed with their assigned families throughout the year. Typically, boys were assigned to do farm work and girls were assigned to domestic tasks. Pratt emphasized that children participating in outing programs should be treated as members of the assigned family, rather than as servants. But enforcement of such a vision was lacking. For most children, taking part in outing programs entailed long days of hard work with little time off; such work was also typical for members of farm families.

== History of outing ==
As historian Victoria Haskins writes in her journal article, "Domesticating Colonizers: Domesticity, Indigenous Domestic Labor, and the Modern Settler Colonial Nation" (2019), Native Americans had long been used as domestic servants and even slaves in white households. Native American children had been sent to white households for assimilation since the colonial era. 18th-century ministers in both New England and Virginia, for instance, brought Native American children into their homes to teach them their ways.

American Indian boarding schools that had no dormitories for female students assigned girls to live with local families. There they were also supposed to learn homemaking skills.

== Carlisle Indian Industrial School outing program ==
In 1878, the US government decided to return a group of Native Americans held as prisoners in Fort Marion (Castillo de San Marcos) in St. Augustine, Florida to their reservations. In 1878, First Lieutenant Richard Henry Pratt persuaded the Bureau of Indian Affairs to give him custody of either fifteen or seventeen young men set to be released for education at Hampton Institute (Hampton University) in Hampton, Virginia. The first formal outings in the United States took place that year when Pratt decided that the Native Americans would benefit from spending the summer with white farmers, and that farmers would benefit from free child labor.

In 1879, Pratt decided that the Native American students should leave the primarily Black Hampton Institute (Hampton University) for closer contact with white people. With the permission of Secretary of the Interior Carl Schurz, Pratt was allowed to open the first government-sponsored American Indian boarding school, the Carlisle Indian Industrial School in Carlisle, Pennsylvania, that year.

The Carlisle Indian Industrial School's outing program started in 1880. Twenty-four children were sent out, but most of the host families returned their assigned children to the school. 109 children were used in Carlisle's outing program the following year, and only six host families returned their assigned children to the school. In 1885, nearly 250 children were included in the summer outing program at Carlisle, and more than 100 continued during the school year. Over the next several years, Carlisle's outing program continued to grow rapidly, peaking at 947 children laborers in 1903.

== Other outing programs ==
Between 1880 and 1886, the Bureau of Indian Affairs opened more than one hundred American Indian boarding schools modeled after Carlisle across the United States, primarily on reservations. Congress passed a series of laws designed to encourage the development of outing programs in those new schools.

In 1889, a dozen boys at Chemawa Indian School in Salem, Oregon, were sent to work in nearby farms. This was the first formal outing program in the western United States. By 1890, outing programs had started at Haskell Institute (Haskell Indian Nations University) in Kansas, Perris School (Sherman Indian High School) in California, Carson School (Stewart Indian School) in Nevada, and Fiske Institute in Albuquerque, New Mexico.

In 1893, Phoenix Indian School in Phoenix, Arizona, began its outing program. It eventually became the second-largest in the country, with hundreds of children being sent out as free labor to area families and businesses.

== Outing matrons ==
The placements of girls within the outing system were overseen by outing matrons, agents of the Bureau of Indian Affairs. In addition to supervising girls and their assigned families, outing matrons courted wealthy families to host children and sought to identify unfit living situations. Still, outing matrons often failed to prevent or respond to abuse and neglect within the outing system.

== Support for outing programs ==
In the United States, the formal primary objective of outing programs was to assimilate Native American children into white American society. Supporters of outing programs hoped that the Native American children involved would be "civilized" and "uplifted" by immersion in white households. Supporters of the programs also argued that the Native American children could be made "useful" through their training for menial positions. That many white families benefited materially through the use of unpaid child labor, and that their farms and other businesses produced wealth via this labor, was not the proclaimed objective of the program.

== Opposition to outing programs ==
Richard Henry Pratt believed that outing programs oriented toward assimilation were more ethical than outing programs oriented toward labor. Pratt spent his retirement years criticizing work-oriented outing programs that were common in the western United States. But abuses have been documented in both types of outing programs.

Major criticisms arose at the start of the outing system. Some people feared that those who would choose to host Native American children would not be motivated by altruism, but would exploit and abuse them. They assumed that only the less honorable would be willing to take Native American children to their homes. They were particularly concerned that families in the western and southwestern United States less morally upright and would not provide a safe home environment for children in the outing system.

Others had concerns about the questionable educational benefits for children in many outing programs and their lack of supervision. In 1926, the Institute for Government Research (Brookings Institution) commissioned the Meriam Report to provide a comprehensive study of the social and economic status of Native Americans. In 1928, the report concluded that the outing system had primarily become a scheme for hiring Native American children for odd jobs and domestic service, rather than providing them with any real training. Also, the report noted that Native American children often earned unfair wages in low-level positions with little oversight.

== Results of outing programs ==
In her article "Working on the Domestic Frontier: American Indian Domestic Servants in White Women's Households in the San Francisco Bay Area, 1920-1940," (2007), historian Margaret Jacobs argues that the outing system failed to assimilate Native American girls. Jacobs explains that Native American girls in outing programs often challenged their assigned roles as servants and host families' attempts to "uplift" them, actively asserting their own independence. She adds that many Native American girls in outing programs rejected the gender and sexual norms promoted by the Bureau of Indian Affairs, instead maintaining the norms of their own communities, while also adopting the gender and sexual norms of urban youth culture.

Nonetheless, in "The Hidden Half: A History of Native American Women's Education," Deirdre Almeida argues that boarding schools and their outing programs contributed to the destruction of Native American women's traditional roles. In addition, boarding schools and their outing programs limited Native American women's work skills so that, for many, becoming servants in white homes was the only choice of work they had when they returned from boarding schools to their reservations.

== List of American Indian boarding schools with outing programs ==
- Carlisle Indian Industrial School in Carlisle, Pennsylvania
- Chemawa Indian School in Salem, Oregon
- Phoenix Indian School in Phoenix, Arizona
- Haskell Institute (Haskell Indian Nations University) in Lawrence, Kansas
- Perris School (Sherman Indian High School) in Riverside, California
- Carson School (Stewart Indian School) in Carson City, Nevada
- Fiske Institute in Albuquerque, New Mexico

== See also ==
- Indian Relocation Act of 1956
- Richard Henry Pratt
- Carlisle Indian Industrial School
- Phoenix Indian School
- American Indian boarding schools
- Meriam Report
- American Indian boarding schools in Wisconsin
- Cultural assimilation of Native Americans
- Contemporary Native American issues in the United States
- Indian Placement Program
