= Fairbanks, Wisconsin =

- Town
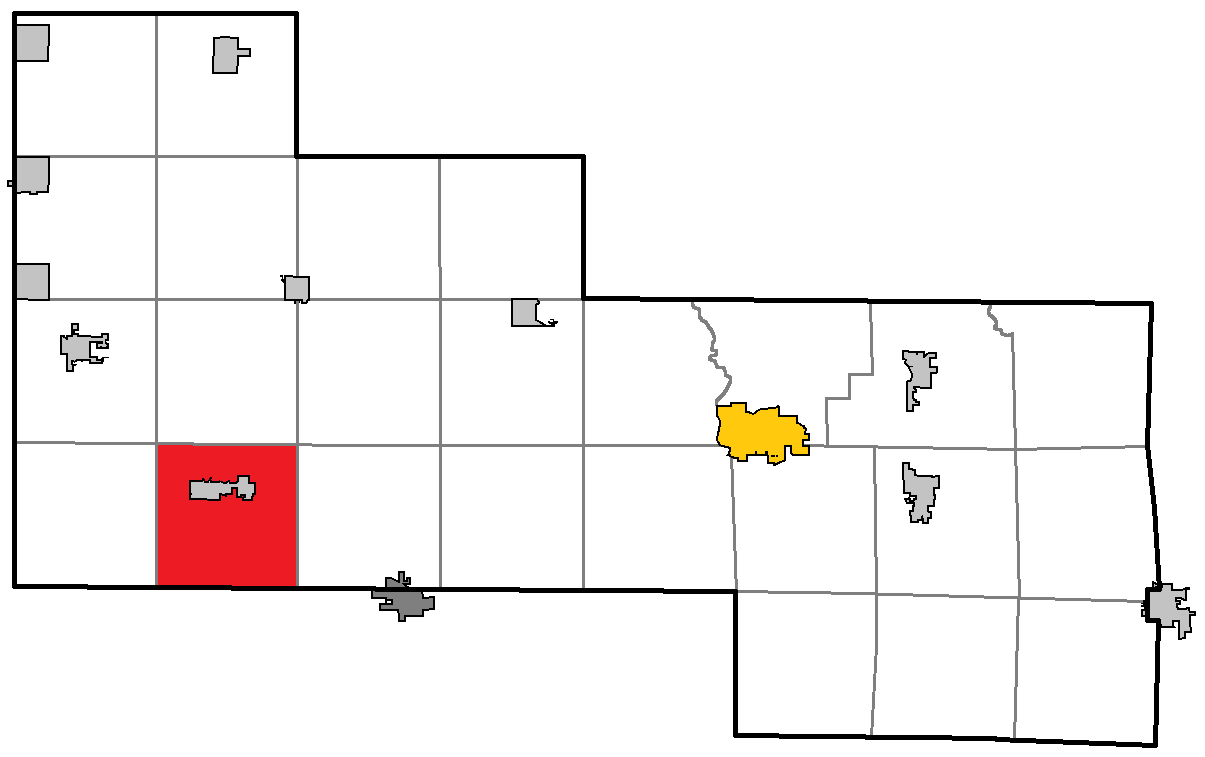
- Location of Fairbanks, within Shawano County
- Coordinates: 44°44′4″N 89°2′43″W
- Country: United States
- State: Wisconsin
- County: Shawano

Area
  - Total: 34.7 sq mi (90.0 km^{2})
  - Land: 34.7 sq mi (89.8 km^{2})
  - Water: 0.077 sq mi (0.2 km^{2})
- Elevation: 1,020 ft (311 m)

Population (2020)
  - Total: 538
  - Density: 15.5/sq mi (5.99/km^{2})
- Time zone: UTC-6 (Central (CST))
  - Summer (DST): UTC-5 (CDT)
- FIPS code: 55-24775
- GNIS feature ID: 1583183

Fairbanks is a town in Shawano County, Wisconsin, United States. The population was 538 at the 2020 census. The unincorporated community of Split Rock is located in the town.

== Geography ==
According to the United States Census Bureau, the town has a total area of 34.8 square miles (90.1 km^{2}), of which 34.7 square miles (89.8 km^{2}) is land and 0.1 square mile (0.2 km^{2}) (0.23%) is water.

== Demographics ==
As of the census of 2000, there were 687 people, 235 households, and 180 families residing in the town. The population density was 19.8 people per square mile (7.6/km^{2}). There were 268 housing units at an average density of 7.7 per square mile (3.0/km^{2}). The racial makeup of the town was 96.51% White, 1.89% African American, 0.15% Native American, 0.44% Asian, and 1.02% from two or more races. Hispanic or Latino of any race were 0.29% of the population.

There were 235 households, out of which 34.9% had children under the age of 18 living with them, 69.4% were married couples living together, 3.4% had a female householder with no husband present, and 23.0% were non-families. 19.1% of all households were made up of individuals, and 11.1% had someone living alone who was 65 years of age or older. The average household size was 2.92 and the average family size was 3.38.

In the town, the population was spread out, with 29.5% under the age of 18, 6.7% from 18 to 24, 25.5% from 25 to 44, 23.3% from 45 to 64, and 15.0% who were 65 years of age or older. The median age was 39 years. For every 100 females, there were 102.1 males. For every 100 females age 18 and over, there were 113.2 males.

The median income for a household in the town was $39,432, and the median income for a family was $46,563. Males had a median income of $35,852 versus $21,917 for females. The per capita income for the town was $16,373. About 5.6% of families and 9.1% of the population were below the poverty line, including 12.4% of those under age 18 and 5.8% of those age 65 or over.

== Notable people ==
- Paul T. Fuhrman, Wisconsin State Representative and businessman, was born in the town
- James Wickstrom, clergyman and white supremacist politician, lived in the town and attempted to establish his own town within its limits
