= Mount Pleasant Indian Industrial Boarding School =

- U.S. National Register of Historic Places
- Michigan State Historic Site
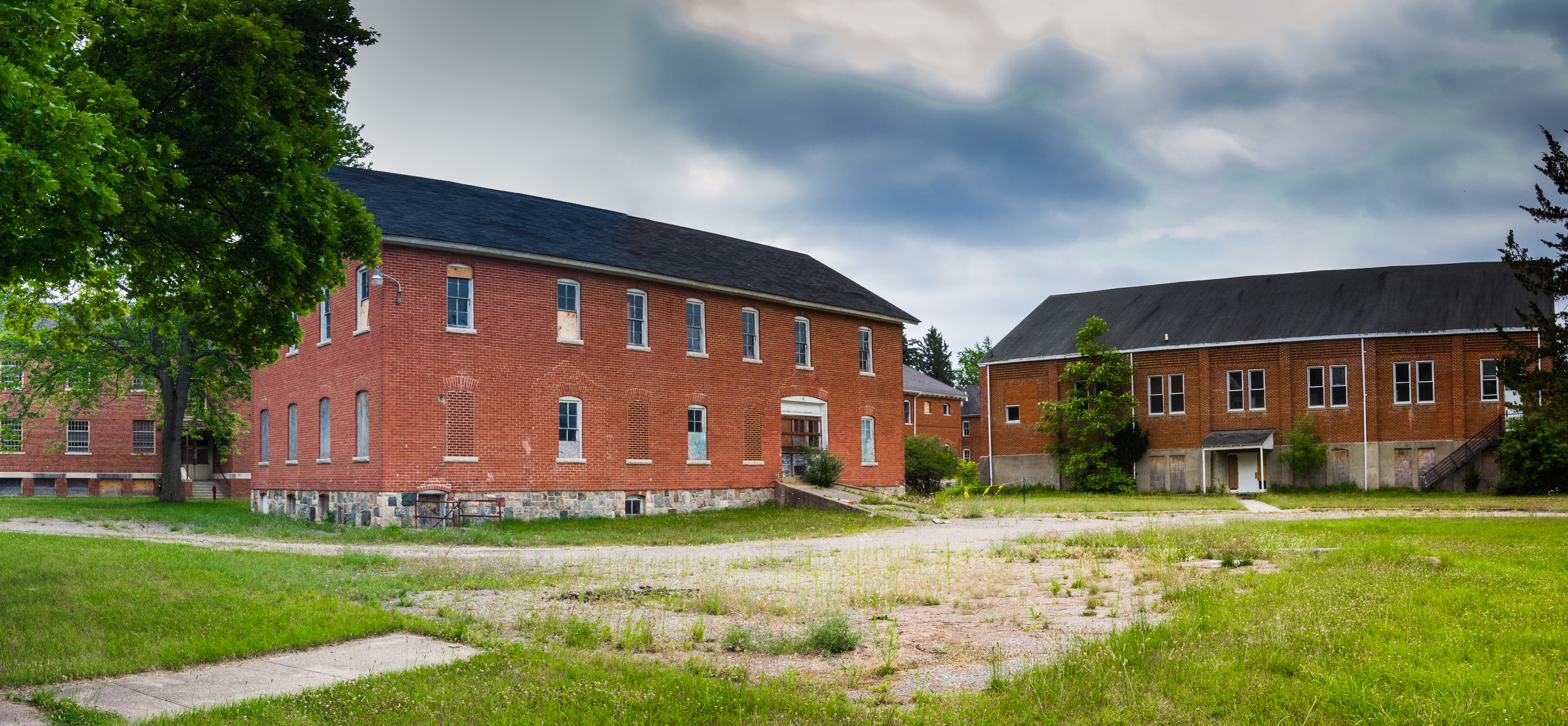
- School, 2018

- Location within Michigan Location within the United States
- Interactive map
- Location: Bounded by Crawford, Pickard, Bamber, River Rds., Mount Pleasant, Michigan
- Coordinates: 43°36′55″N 84°47′26″W
- Built: 1892
- NRHP reference No.: 100001795
- Added to NRHP: February 28, 2018

The Mount Pleasant Indian Industrial Boarding School in Mt. Pleasant, Michigan, was established by an act of the United States Congress in 1891. This provided funding for creation of an education system of off-reservation boarding schools and vocational training centers to educate Native American children. It was extending a model developed and practiced first at the Carlisle Indian Industrial School, which opened in 1879 and was directed by Richard Henry Pratt, an Army officer.

== Beginnings ==
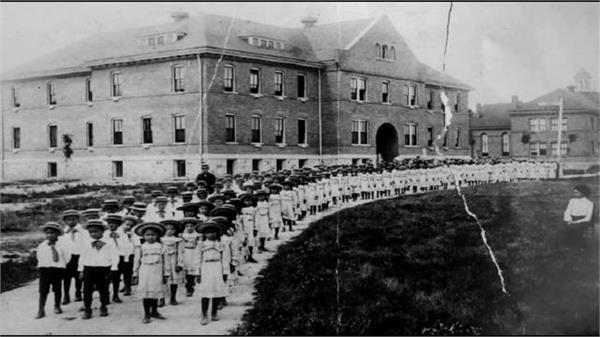
School, c. 1910

The cornerstone of the first of eleven buildings that would make up the boarding school's campus was placed in front of a crowd of more than 2,000 people from across the state on October 18, 1892. As part of the crowd's celebration, they congregated in the town of Mount Pleasant, Michigan and paraded to the school grounds some distance away in farmland. The Grand Master of the Free and Accepted Masons was on hand to lead in the "ancient ritual" of laying the cornerstone. The Grand Chaplain led the crowd in a Christian prayer to bless the school and all those that would reside there.

What then was known as the Mount Pleasant Indian Industrial Boarding School started as a small school authorized by the federal government and operated by a mission of the United Methodist Church. It had previously been known as the "farm school", as it was developed in the middle of farmland outside of Mount Pleasant. Located in Isabella County, it was near the Isabella Indian Reservation of the federally recognized Saginaw Chippewa Tribal Nation.

== Buildings and grounds ==
In 1892, construction began of the first school building of the new school dedicated to educating Native American children. October 18, 1892, dedication ceremonies for the main building took place and on January 3, 1893, the eight-classroom building opened to the first seventeen students. By June 1893, enrollment had increased significantly. In the coming years, the school expanded, building additional structures to accommodate all of the students and their daily activities.

There were separate boys and girls dormitories, a hospital, a woodworking and blacksmith shop; a building for industrial training, a dining hall, a clubhouse for employees of the school, and several farm buildings. In 1910 the school built a new gymnasium. Adjacent to the school was an "Indian Cemetery", which is still visible today.

== The children ==
Native American children from all over the State of Michigan, along with children from Alaska, Minnesota, Wisconsin, and New York were forced to the Mount Pleasant Indian Industrial Boarding School. It had an average enrollment of more than 300 students annually for many of the years it was open.

== School is in session ==
The Native American children at the boarding school received basic academic instruction in grades kindergarten through eighth (K-8) at the Mount Pleasant School (9th grade was added in 1926-1927 school year. The strict and structured schedule was focused on vocational training and religious education. Classes were offered in English language, woodworking, farming, sewing/tailoring, laundry, housekeeping and basic first aid. The coursework included teaching students how to adapt and fit into "white culture". Rumors of extreme abuse suffered by students as told by locals permeate the locale. The documentary film Indian School: Stories of Survival includes interviews with attendees of the Mount Pleasant Indian Industrial Boarding School and some of their descendants. The Saginaw Chippewa Tribe maintains a YouTube channel documenting remembrance ceremonies for the students who attended and died there.

== Mount Pleasant Branch of the Michigan Home and Training School ==
Classes for the Native American children at the school continued until the school closed on June 6, 1934. The property was transferred by the federal government to the State of Michigan for use by the Michigan Department of Mental Health services.

After that, it was called The Mount Pleasant Branch of the Michigan Home and Training School. The intent of this home and training school was to house and train mentally handicapped young men. Many of the boys were abandoned; some were juvenile criminals who did not understand their crime or charges in court, and even more of the residents were mentally or physically handicapped. A majority of the residents had some kind of mental health issue.

== Closure ==
The facility closed in 2008 when the State of Michigan decided to close it due to budget shortfalls and dwindling numbers utilizing the facility. Since their closure, the buildings have stood empty and abandoned. Today, the majority have broken or boarded windows and doors and are in a state of general disrepair. The interiors are filled with abandoned furniture, unused medical supplies, and refuse left at the time of closing. Much of the appearance of the interiors is due to years of neglect since the closure. The abandonment has left the complex vulnerable to vandals and the elements. It is now owned by the Saginaw Chippewa Tribal Nation. One plan is to make the former school a museum.

The tribe's current plan is to repair the campus over 5-10 years, while abating any hazardous materials. The workshop building would be repurposed as a community center with the others un-utilized to let the quiet inside the buildings speak for themselves.

The property was listed on the National Register of Historic Places in 2018.

== Images ==
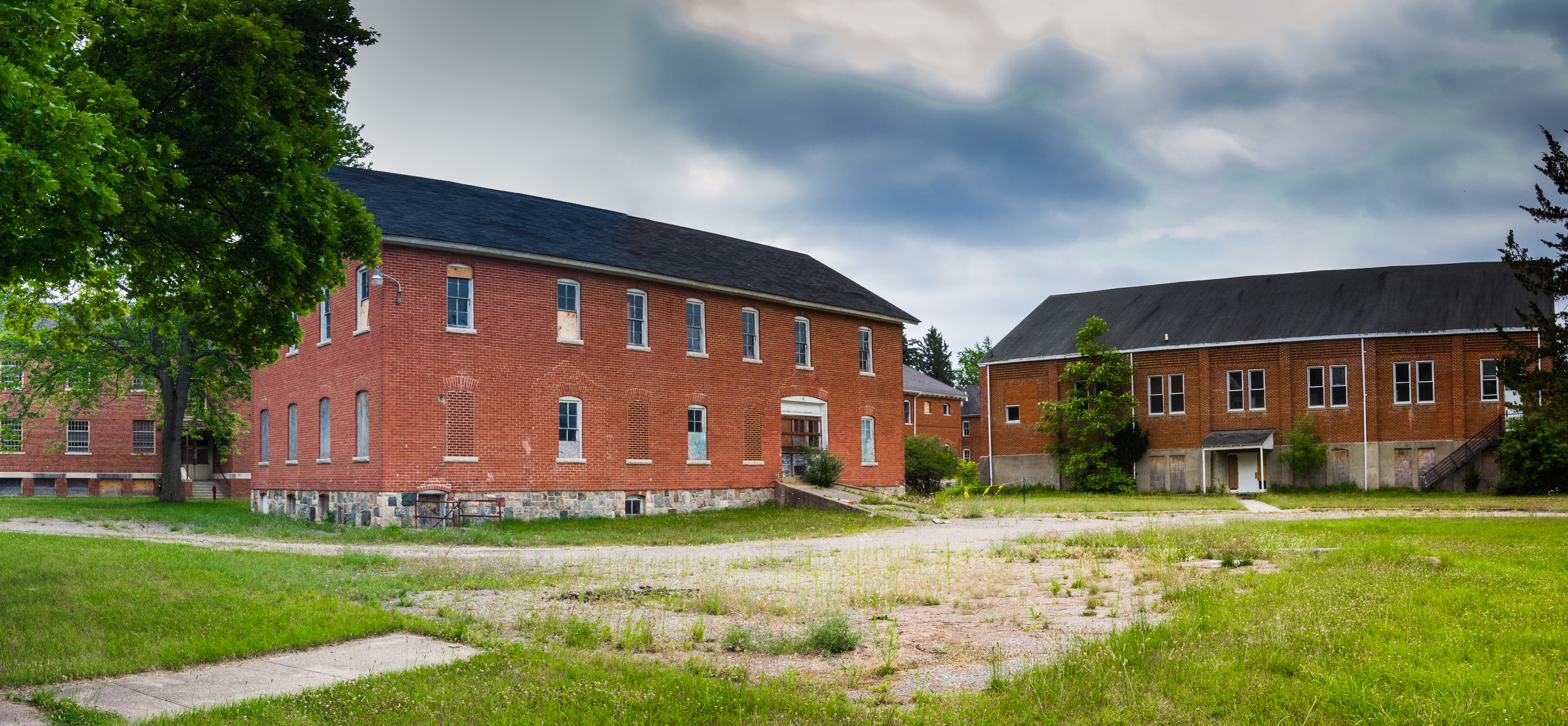

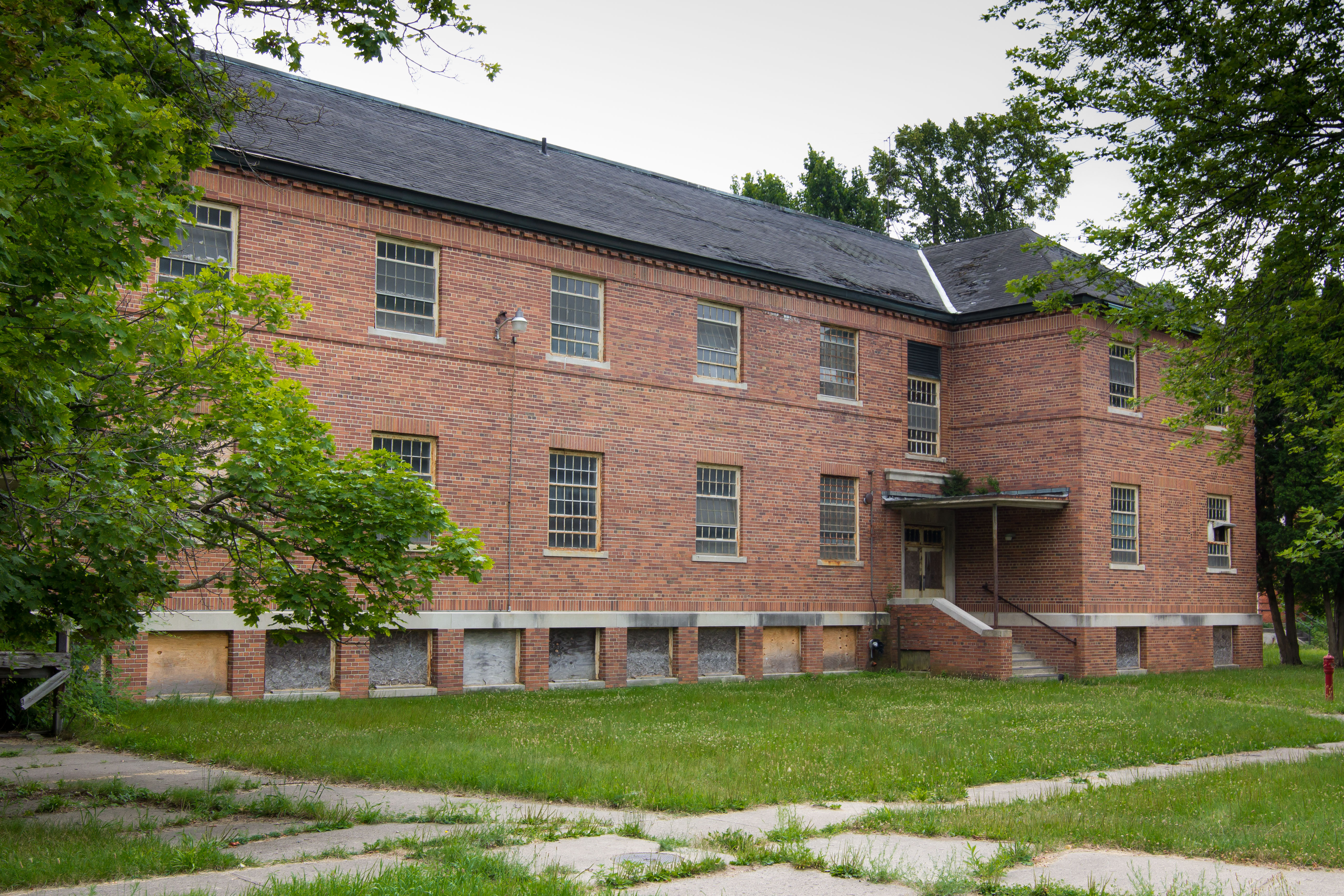

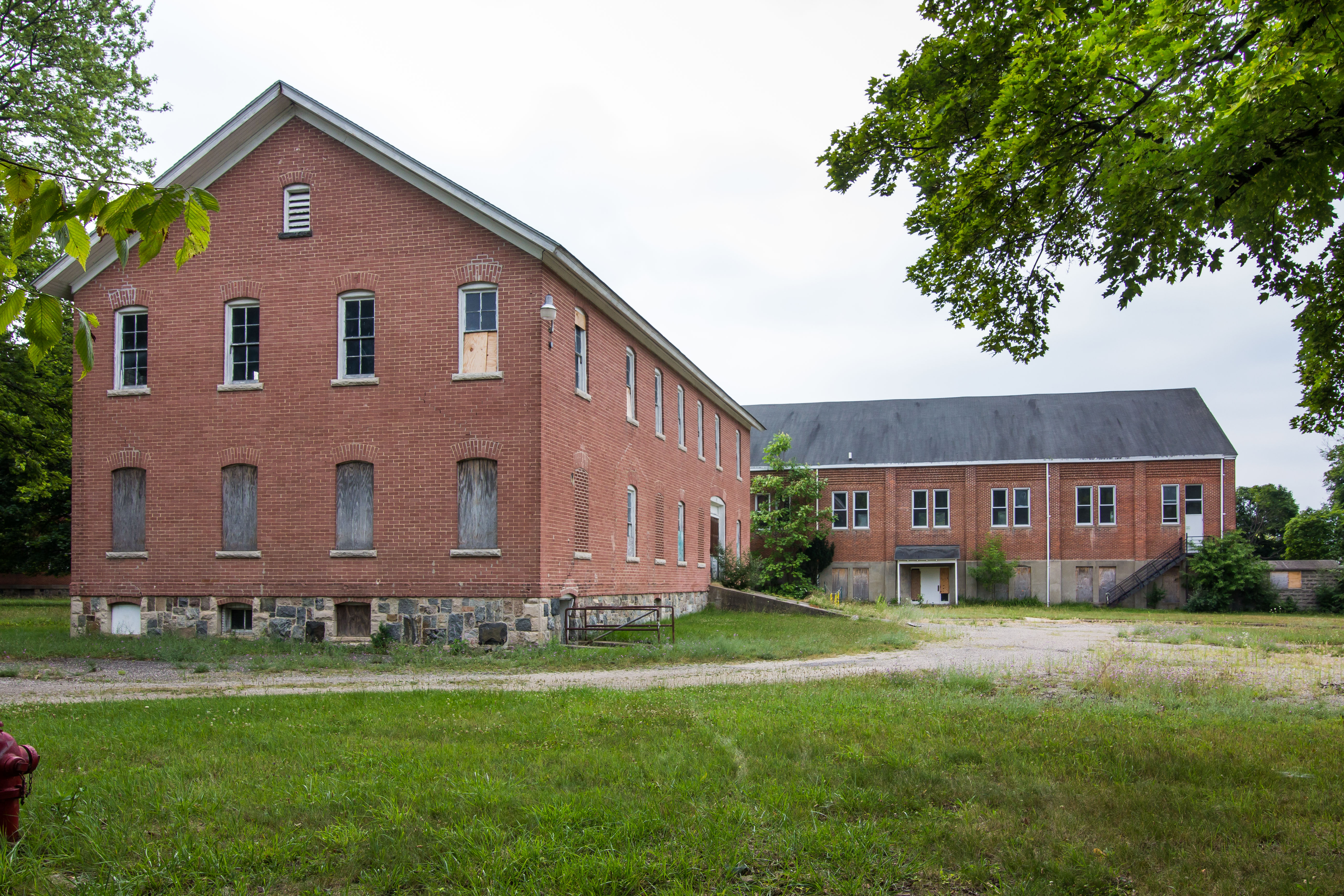

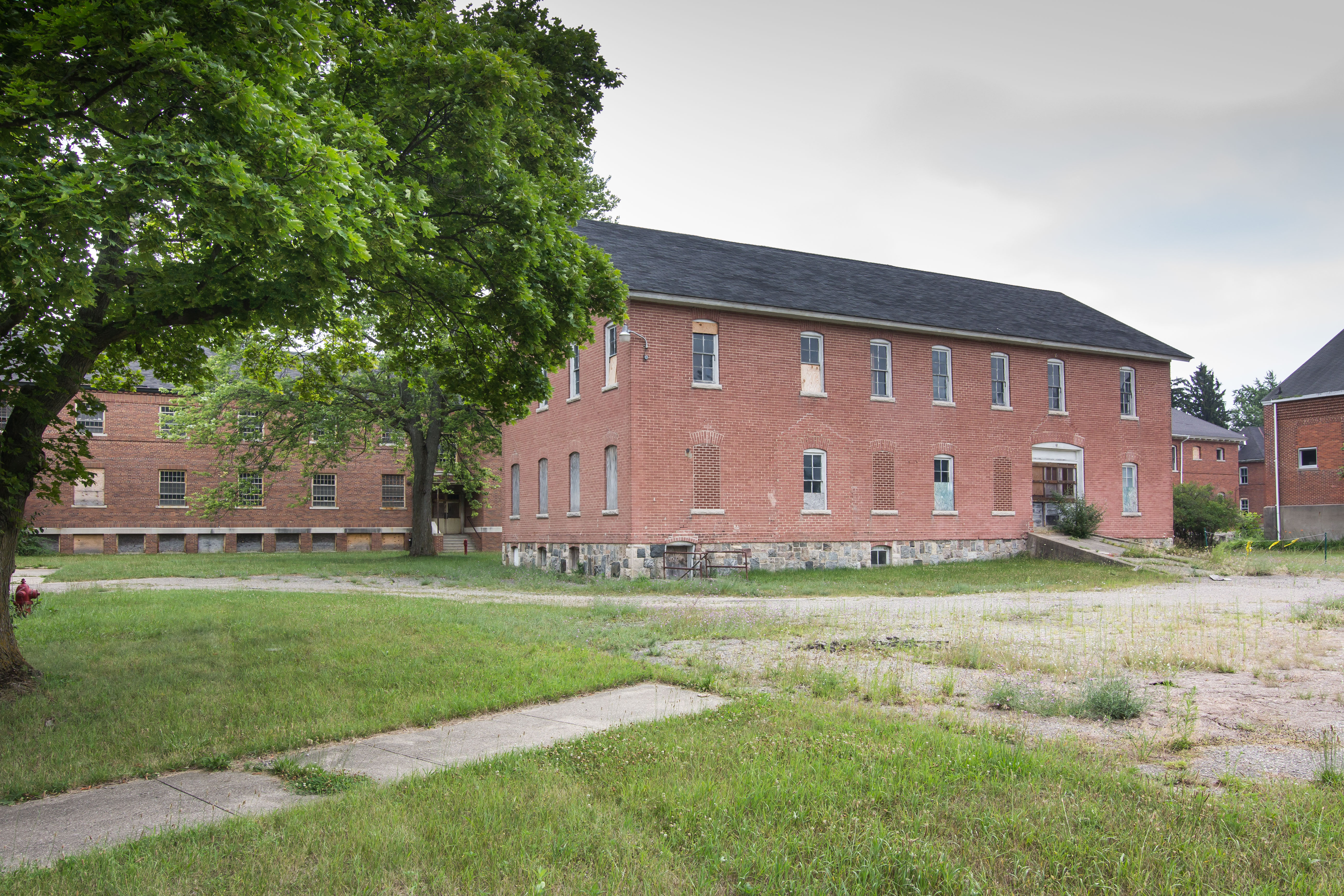

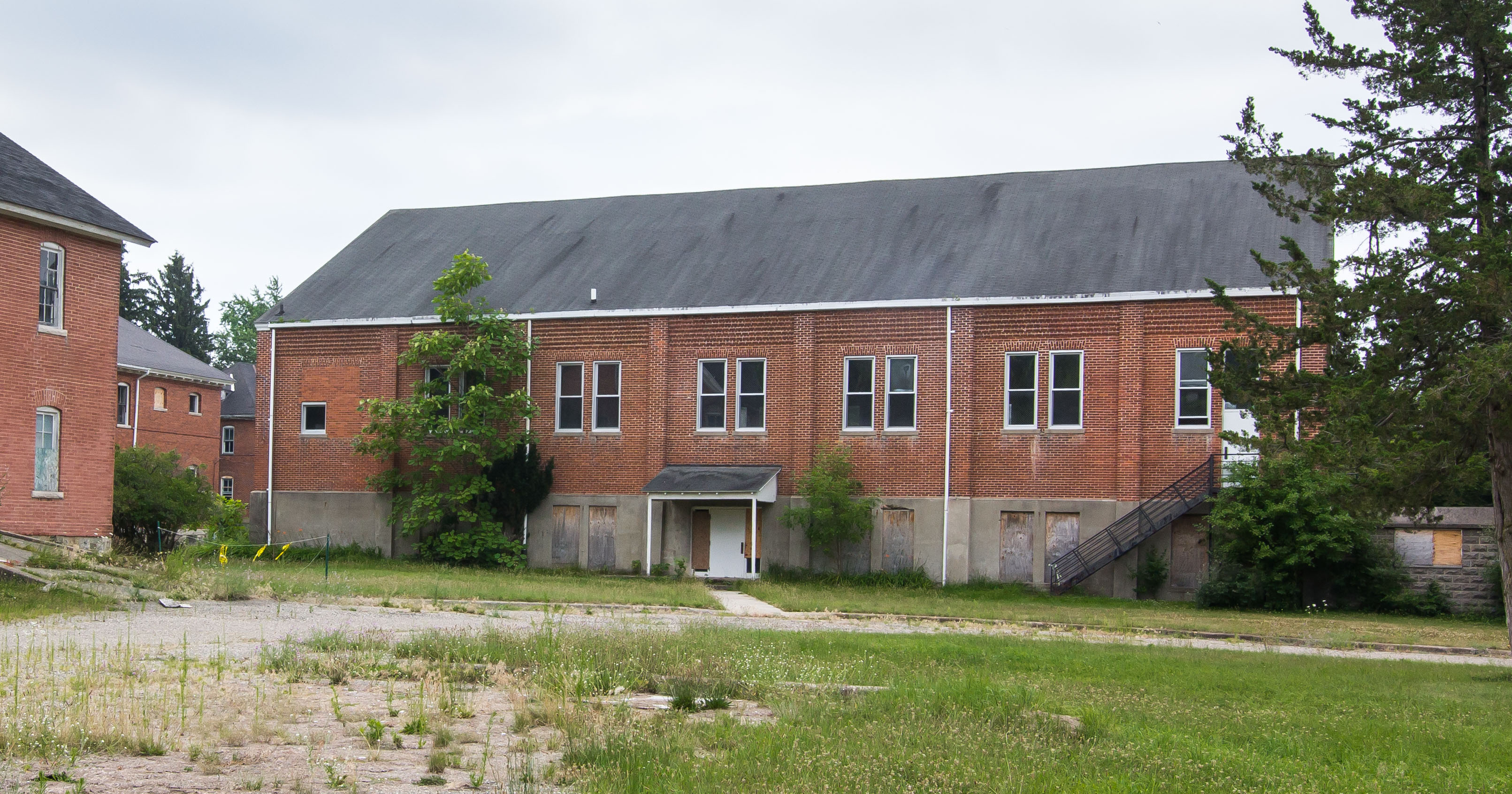

== See also ==
- Carlisle Indian Industrial School
- Bureau of Indian Affairs
- Native American Boarding Schools
- National Register of Historic Places listings in Isabella County, Michigan
