= Roy Thomas (disambiguation) =

Roy Thomas (born 1940) is an American comic book writer and editor.

Roy Thomas may also refer to:

- Roy Thomas (outfielder) (1874–1959), Major League Baseball outfielder
- Roy Thomas (artist) (1949–2004), Anishnabe painter
- Roy Thomas (pitcher) (born 1953), Major League Baseball pitcher
- Roy K. Thomas (1887–1977), American college sports coach

== See also ==
- Rob Thomas (disambiguation)
- Rod Thomas (disambiguation)
