= Rod Thomas (disambiguation) =

Rod Thomas (1947–2025) was a Welsh international footballer.

Rod or Rodney Thomas may also refer to:

- Rod Thomas (bishop) (born 1954), English Anglican bishop
- Rod Thomas (English footballer) (born 1970)
- Rod Thomas (born 1982/83), Welsh musician known professionally as Bright Light Bright Light
- Rodney Thomas (1973–2014), American football player
- Rodney Thomas II (born 1998), American football player
- Rodney Thomas (defensive back) (born 1965), American football player

== See also ==
- Rob Thomas (disambiguation)
- Roy Thomas (disambiguation)
