= Lutheran Indian Mission =

Historic church in Wisconsin, United States

- U.S. National Register of Historic Places
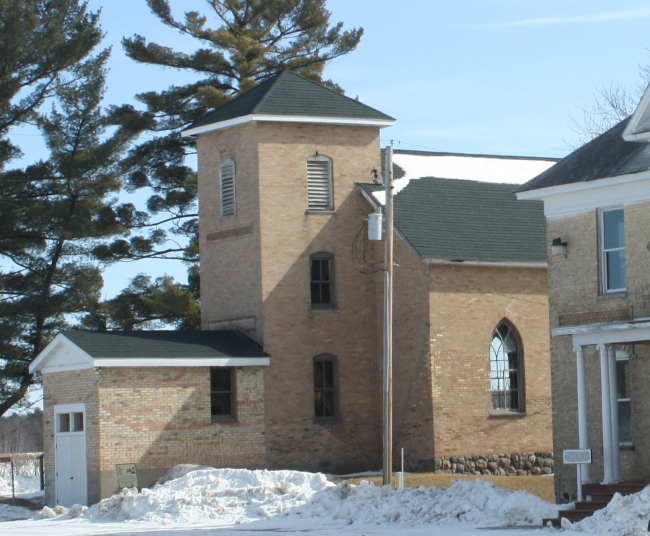

- Location within Wisconsin Location within the United States
- Nearest city: Gresham, Wisconsin
- Coordinates: 44°52′39″N 88°45′35″W
- Area: 0.5 acres (0.20 ha)
- Built: 1902
- NRHP reference No.: 80000195
- Added to NRHP: October 22, 1980

Lutheran Indian Mission (Immanuel Mohican Lutheran Church) is a historic church in Gresham, Wisconsin, United States. The Mission church and school was built in 1901 by the Lutheran Church–Missouri Synod to serve Stockbridge Indians. The school operated until 1958 and the church continues today.

== Notable students ==
- Dorothy Davids (1923–2014) educator and Native American rights activist
