= Red Springs, Wisconsin =

- Town
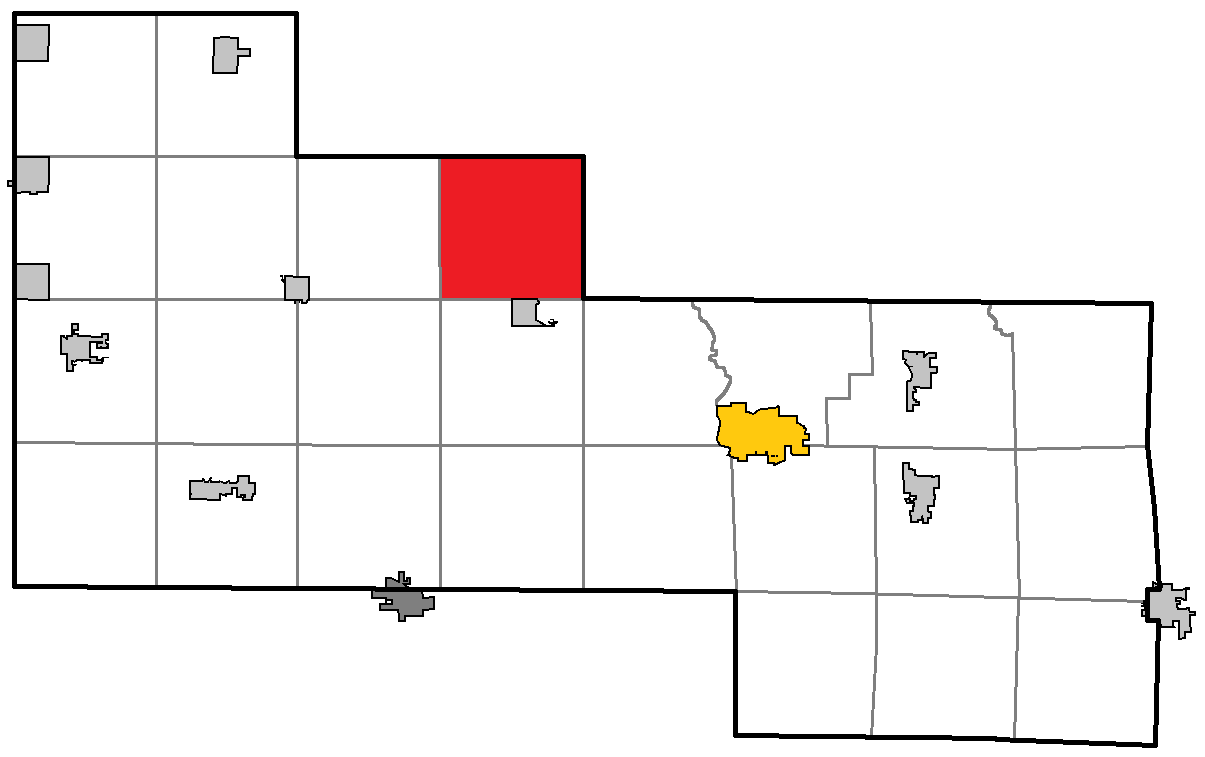
- Location of Red Springs, within Shawano County
- Coordinates: 44°54′11″N 88°46′36″W
- Country: United States
- State: Wisconsin
- County: Shawano

Area
  - Total: 36.5 sq mi (94.5 km^{2})
  - Land: 35.8 sq mi (92.6 km^{2})
  - Water: 0.69 sq mi (1.8 km^{2})
- Elevation: 950 ft (290 m)

Population (2020)
  - Total: 993
  - Density: 27.8/sq mi (10.7/km^{2})
- Time zone: UTC-6 (Central (CST))
  - Summer (DST): UTC-5 (CDT)
- FIPS code: 55-66750
- GNIS feature ID: 1584004
- Website: https://townofredsprings.com/

Red Springs is a town in Shawano County, Wisconsin, United States. As of the 2020 census, the town had a total population of 993. The unincorporated community of Morgan is located in the town. The census-designated place of Middle Village is also located partially in the town.

== Geography ==
According to the United States Census Bureau, the town has a total area of 36.5 square miles (94.4 km^{2}), of which 35.8 square miles (92.6 km^{2}) is land and 0.7 square mile (1.8 km^{2}) (1.92%) is water.

The federally recognized Stockbridge-Munsee Community is located in Red Springs and nearby Bartelme. A section of the Menominee Indian Reservation is also located in the town.

== Demographics ==
As of the 2019, there were 915 people, 324 households, and 255 families residing in the town. The population density was 25.1 people per square mile (9.9/km^{2}). There were 438 housing units at an average density of 12 per square mile (4.6/km^{2}). The racial makeup of the town was 45.87% White, 51.58% Native American, 0.10% Asian, and 2.45% from two or more races. Hispanic or Latino of any race were 3.87% of the population.

There were 324 households, out of which 40.7% had children under the age of 18 living with them, 55.6% were married couples living together, 15.7% had a female householder with no husband present, and 21.0% were non-families. 14.8% of all households were made up of individuals, and 5.9% had someone living alone who was 65 years of age or older. The average household size was 2.94 and the average family size was 3.24.

In the town, the population was spread out, with 32.7% under the age of 18, 6.7% from 18 to 24, 25.3% from 25 to 44, 22.5% from 45 to 64, and 12.7% who were 65 years of age or older. The median age was 35 years. For every 100 females, there were 100.2 males. For every 100 females age 18 and over, there were 99.4 males.

The median income for a household in the town was $40,833, and the median income for a family was $45,625. Males had a median income of $30,208 versus $24,750 for females. The per capita income for the town was $13,736. About 11.6% of families and 11.6% of the population were below the poverty line, including 18.9% of those under age 18 and 1.2% of those age 65 or over.
