= St. Joseph's Industrial School =

Historic former school in Delaware, US

- U.S. National Register of Historic Places
- U.S. Historic district
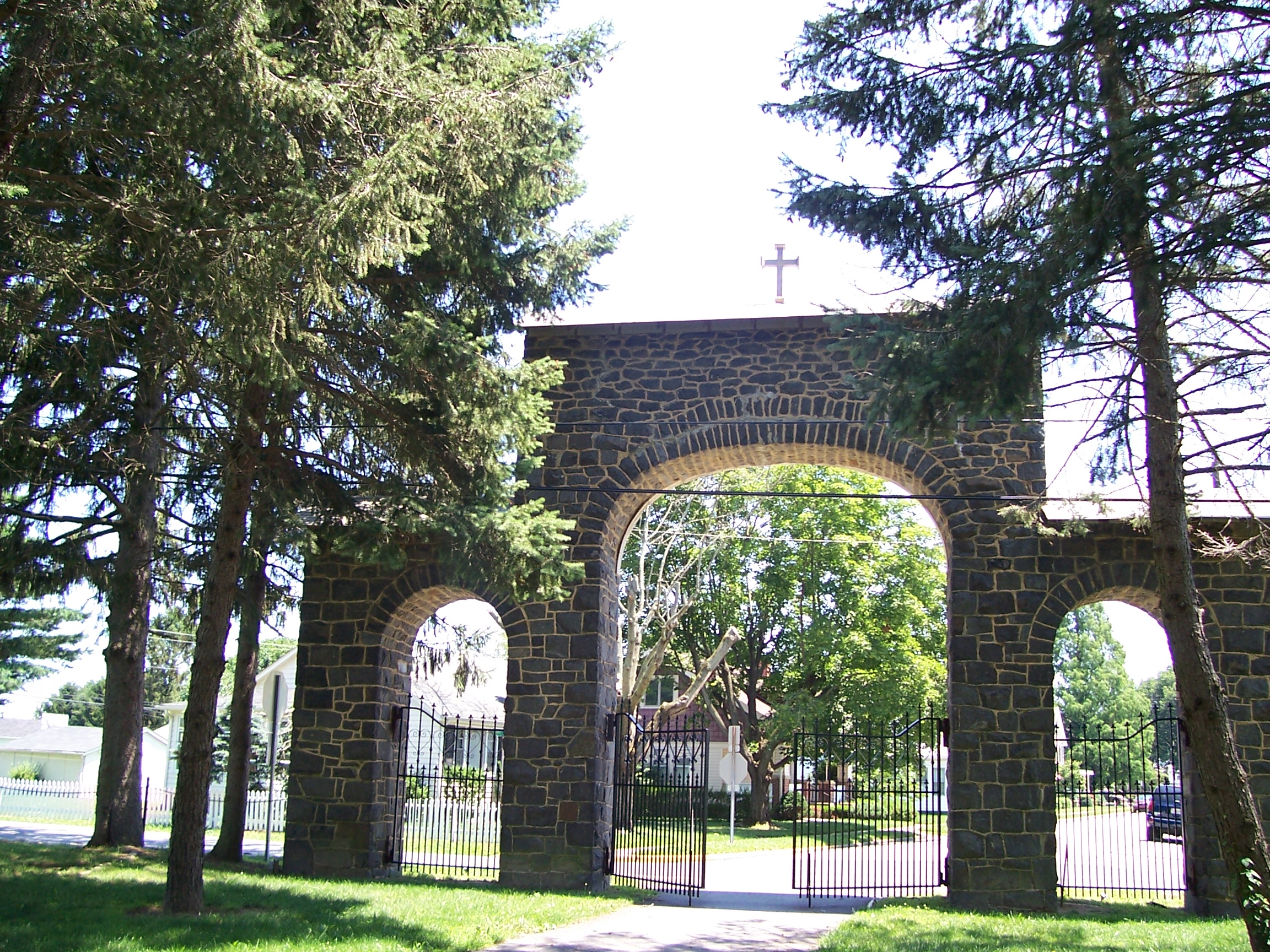
- Entry Arch

- Location within Delaware Location within the United States
- Location: 355 W. Duck Creek Rd., Clayton, Delaware
- Coordinates: 39°17′37″N 75°38′13″W
- Area: 2.2 hectares (5.5 acres)
- Built: 1896
- Architect: Gaudreau and Gaudreau
- Architectural style: Italianate, Colonial Revival
- NRHP reference No.: 02001491
- Added to NRHP: 12 December 2002

St. Joseph's Industrial School is a historic former Black Catholic school and historic district in Clayton, Kent County, Delaware. It was added to the National Register of Historic Places in 2002.

== Building ==
It encompasses three contributing buildings, one contributing structure, and three contributing objects. They are the Italianate-style Chapel (1896), Colonial Revival-style Administration Building and Rectory (1951), St. Michael's Hall (1960), the Entry Arch (1896), and three figural marble religious statues.

== History ==
The school was founded by the St. Joseph Society of the Sacred Heart and opened in 1896 as an educational institution for young African-American men during the time of segregation. The school was closed in 1972 by the Josephite Society, which established the St. Joseph Center for Prayer at the facility in 1973.

In March 2002, the St. Joseph's Project Foundation purchased the property and secured a charter school to rehabilitate and occupy the buildings. It was added to the National Register of Historic Places the same year.

A Marine Corps JROTC school known as First State Military Academy (part of the New Tech Network) occupied the property as of 2014, still using the three main buildings.

== See also ==
- St. Joseph's Catholic Church (Wilmington, Delaware)
- National Register of Historic Places listings in Kent County, Delaware
