= Bartelme, Wisconsin =

- Town
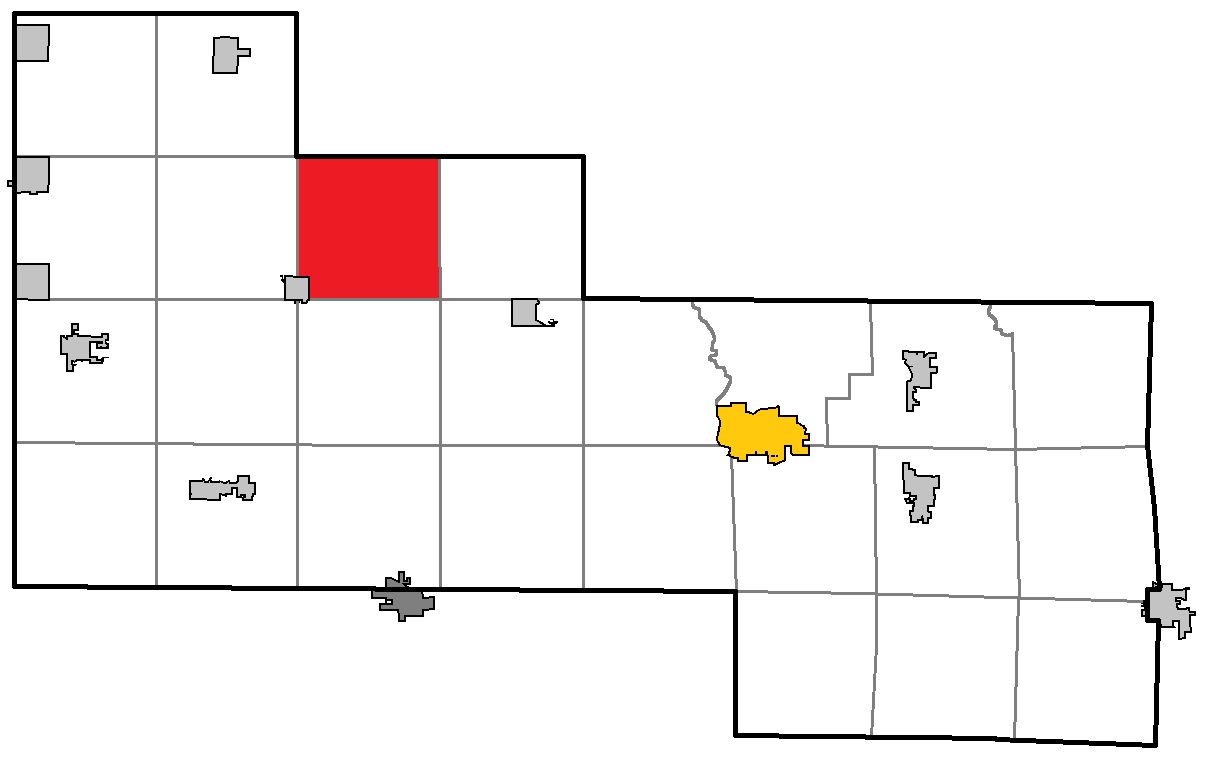
- Location of Bartelme, within Shawano County
- Coordinates: 44°54′13″N 88°55′35″W
- Country: United States
- State: Wisconsin
- County: Shawano

Area
  - Total: 35.6 sq mi (92.1 km^{2})
  - Land: 35.5 sq mi (92.0 km^{2})
  - Water: 0.077 sq mi (0.2 km^{2})
- Elevation: 1,099 ft (335 m)

Population (2020)
  - Total: 810
  - Density: 23/sq mi (8.8/km^{2})
- Time zone: UTC-6 (Central (CST))
  - Summer (DST): UTC-5 (CDT)
- FIPS code: 55-05000
- GNIS feature ID: 1582758

Bartelme is a town in Shawano County, Wisconsin, United States. The population was 810 at the 2020 census.

== Geography ==
According to the United States Census Bureau, the town has a total area of 35.6 square miles (92.1 km^{2}), of which 35.5 square miles (92.0 km^{2}) is land and 0.1 square mile (0.2 km^{2}) (0.17%) is water.

The federally recognized Stockbridge-Munsee Community is located in Bartelme.

== Demographics ==
At the 2000 census there were 700 people, 253 households, and 184 families in the town. The population density was 19.7 people per square mile (7.6/km^{2}). There were 289 housing units at an average density of 8.1 per square mile (3.1/km^{2}). The racial makeup of the town was 23.43% White, 74.29% Native American, 0.43% Asian, and 1.86% from two or more races. Hispanic or Latino of any race were 1.00%.

Of the 253 households 37.9% had children under the age of 18 living with them, 44.3% were married couples living together, 20.6% had a female householder with no husband present, and 26.9% were non-families. 22.9% of households were one person and 11.9% were one person aged 65 or older. The average household size was 2.74 and the average family size was 3.17.

The age distribution was 30.7% under the age of 18, 10.4% from 18 to 24, 25.4% from 25 to 44, 20.1% from 45 to 64, and 13.3% 65 or older. The median age was 33 years. For every 100 females, there were 96.1 males. For every 100 females age 18 and over, there were 95.6 males.

The median household income was $32,788 and the median family income was $40,156. Males had a median income of $27,059 versus $22,614 for females. The per capita income for the town was $15,156. About 10.8% of families and 15.5% of the population were below the poverty line, including 21.1% of those under age 18 and 22.0% of those age 65 or over.
