= Richard Henry Pratt =

United States Army officer

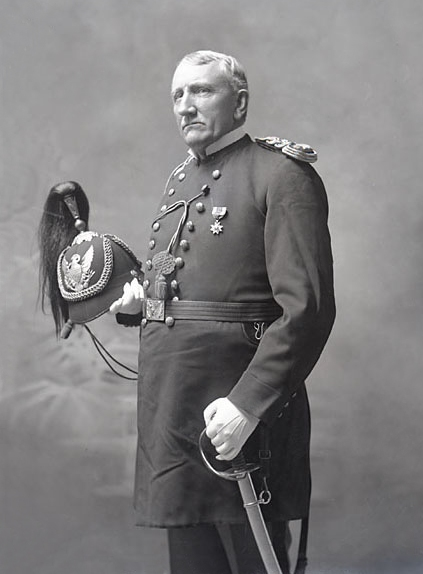
- Pratt as a United States Army lieutenant in 1879
- Born: December 6, 1840; Rushford, New York, U.S.
- Died: March 15, 1924 (aged 83); San Francisco, California, U.S.
- Burial place: Arlington National Cemetery
- Spouse: Anna Laura
- Military career
- Allegiance: United States; Union
- Branch: United States Army; Union Army
- Service years: 1861–1903
- Rank: Brigadier-General (Regular Army); Captain (United States Volunteers)
- Commands: Carlisle Indian Industrial School

Brigadier-General Richard Henry Pratt (December 6, 1840 – March 15, 1924) was a United States Army officer who founded the Carlisle Indian Industrial School in Pennsylvania in 1879 and served as its longtime superintendent. Prior to this, Pratt also supervised American Indian prisoners of war held at Fort Marion in St. Augustine, Florida. He is known for using the phrase "kill the Indian, save the man" in reference to the ethics of the school and efforts to forcibly assimilate Indian tribes into white American culture. Pratt is also associated with the first recorded use of the word "racism," which he used in 1902 to criticize the policy of racial segregation in the United States.

== Early life ==
Pratt was born on December 6, 1840, in Rushford, New York, to Richard and Mary Pratt (née Herrick). He was the eldest of their three sons. He contracted the smallpox disease as a young child, and had lifelong facial scarring as a result. In 1847, his father moved the family west to Logansport, Indiana.

Pratt's father later left his family to take part in the California Gold Rush in 1849, hoping to strike it rich, but was robbed and murdered by another prospector. Pratt had to support his mother and two younger brothers all by himself.

== Career ==
=== American Civil War ===
At the outbreak of the American Civil War, Pratt enlisted in the 9th Indiana Infantry Regiment. After his first three-month term expired, he re-enlisted as a sergeant of the 2nd Regiment Indiana Cavalry; he saw action at the Battle of Chickamauga. While on a recruiting detail in Indiana during the winter of 1863-1864, Pratt met Anna Mason. They were married on April 12, 1864. Eight days later he was commissioned as a first lieutenant of the 11th Regiment Indiana Cavalry.

Pratt served in administrative roles for the remainder of the war and was mustered out of the Volunteer Service on May 29, 1865, at the rank of captain. He became a companion of the Military Order of the Loyal Legion of the United States, a military society for officers who had served the Union during the Civil War.

Pratt returned to Logansport, Indiana to be reunited with Anna, where he ran a hardware store. After two years in the hardware business, he re-entered the Army in March 1867 as a second lieutenant of the 10th United States Cavalry. This was an African American regiment, some of whose members were freedmen. When they were assigned to Fort Sill in the Oklahoma Territory, they were nicknamed by Native Americans as the "Buffalo Soldiers", because of the texture of their hair.

Pratt's long and active military career included eight years in the Great Plains, during the Indian Wars. He participated in the Washita campaign of 1868–1869 and the Red River War of 1874–1875. The severe winter of 1874-1875 resulted in many hostiles surrendering to US Indian Agents for their tribes. Pratt was responsible for gathering testimony to assess charges against men for actions outside warfare. He worked with interpreters and prisoners to clear as many charges as possible.

Pratt was promoted to captain in February 1883; major in July 1898; lieutenant colonel in February 1901; and to colonel in January 1903. He retired from the Army in February 1903; in April 1904 he was advanced to brigadier general on the Retired List.

=== Fort Marion and Carlisle ===
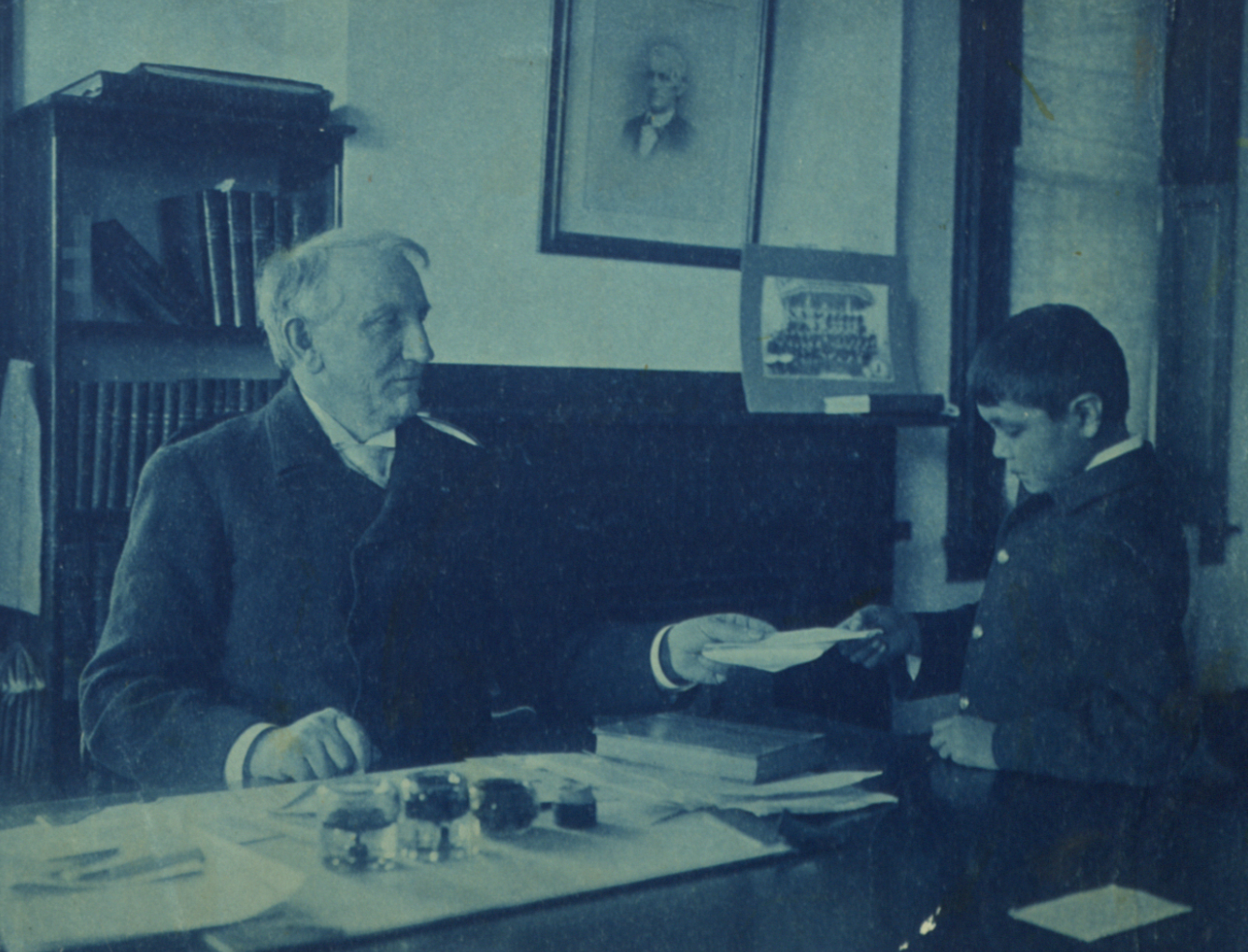
General Pratt and a young student at the Carlisle Indian Industrial School in Carlisle, Pennsylvania, c. 1890

After the Indian Wars subsided, President Ulysses S. Grant's Attorney General concluded that a state of war could not exist between a nation and its wards (which the federally recognized tribes were considered). He ordered the prisoners to be sent as prisoners of war for permanent imprisonment at Fort Marion, St. Augustine, Florida. Pratt was chosen to lead and supervise the prisoners at the fort, because he had experience with both the Indians and interpreters from working on their cases. After he requested further authority over the prisoners, he began to experiment with education at the fort.

In the 1870s at Fort Marion in St. Augustine, Florida, he introduced classes in the English language, art, and craftsmanship to several dozen prisoners who had been chosen from among those who had surrendered in the Indian Territory at the end of the Red River War. In addition, he worked to give prisoners agency and some independence: enlisting them in guard duty, assigning them other supervisory roles over their community, leading marching and maneuvers for exercise. In June 1879, while he was still stationed in Florida, Pratt visited a Seminole village which was headed by Chief Chipco. Pratt spoke to Chipco and wrote an ethnographic study about the village.

On November 1, 1879, he founded the Carlisle Indian Industrial School at Carlisle, Pennsylvania, the first of many off-reservation boarding schools for American Indians.

Pratt did not regard his innovations at Fort Marion as limited to American Indians. He developed the paradigm of compulsory immersion education. At various times, it would be used in attempted assimilation of other minorities in the United States and its territories, including African Americans, Puerto Ricans, Mexicans, Latinos, Pacific Islanders, Asians, and Mormons. He took his pedagogical inspiration from the Puritans.

=== Cultural assimilation of Native Americans ===
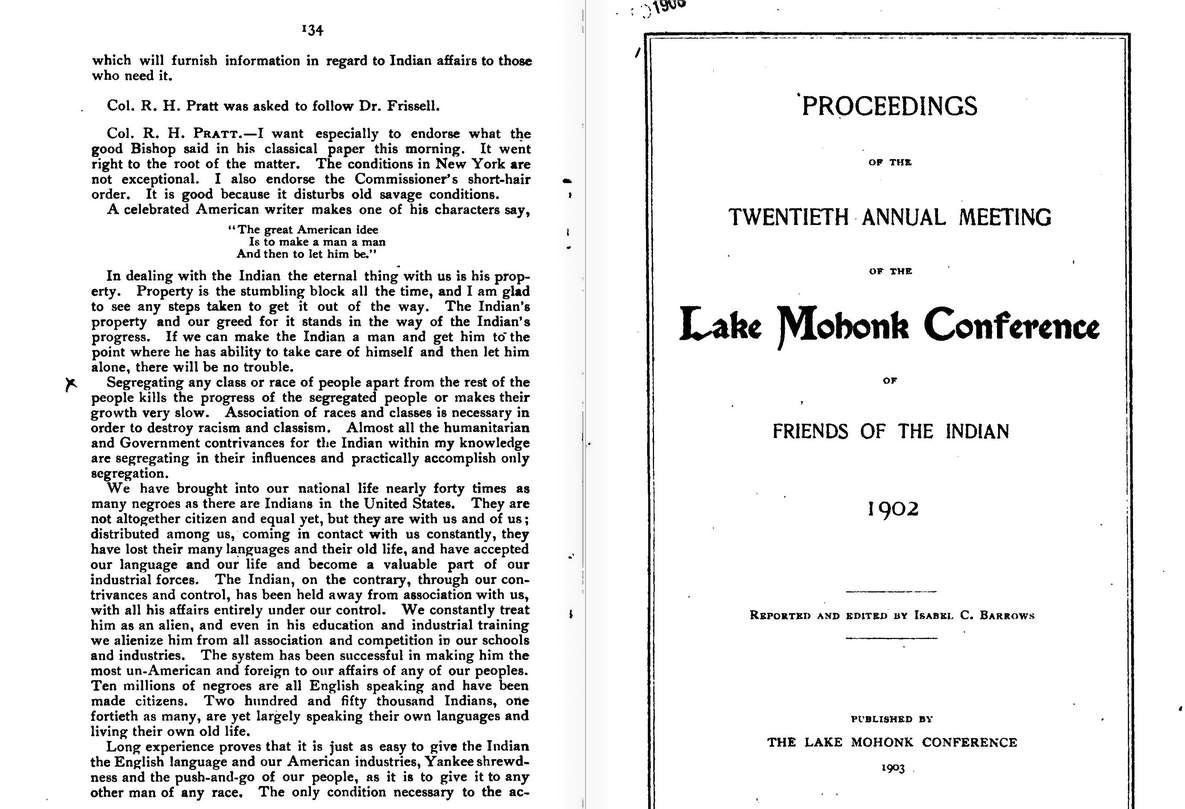
"Association of races and classes is necessary to destroy racism and classism," Pratt wrote in 1902

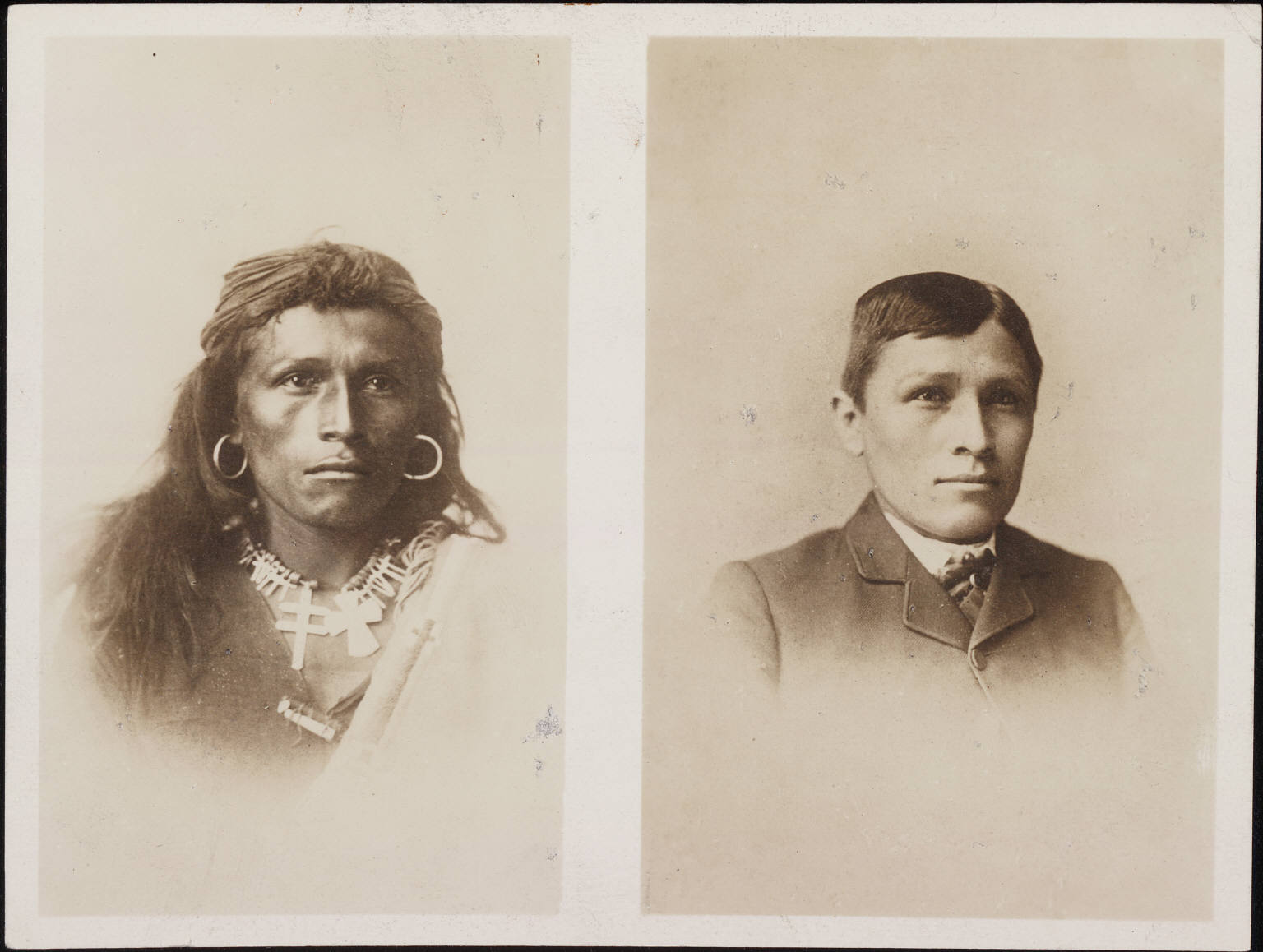
Photographs of a student (left) prior to his admission to Carlisle Indian Industrial School and after being admitted to the school (right), c. 1882

Pratt instituted a practice of Americanization of American Indians by cultural assimilation, which he effected both at Fort Marion and Carlisle. He believed that to claim their rightful place as American citizens, Native Americans needed to renounce their tribal way of life, convert to Christianity, abandon their reservations, and seek education and employment among the "best classes" of Americans. In his writings he described his belief that the government must "kill the Indian...to save the man".

Pratt was outspoken and a leading member of what was called the "Friends of the Indian" movement at the end of the 19th century. He believed in the "noble" cause of "civilizing" Native Americans. He said, "The Indians need the chances of participation you have had and they will just as easily become useful citizens."

Pratt regarded American Indians as worthy of respect and help, and capable of full participation in society. Many of his contemporaries regarded American Indians as nearly subhuman.. Pratt preached assimilation in a day marked by rank segregation.

Pratt was opposed to the segregation of American Indian tribes on reservations, believing that it made them vulnerable to speculators and people who would take advantage of them. He came into conflict with the Indian Bureau and other government officials who supported the reservation system, as well as all those who made profits from them. In May 1904, Pratt denounced the Indian Bureau and the reservation system as a hindrance to the civilization and assimilation of Native Americans. This controversy, coupled with earlier disputes with the government over civil service reform, led to Pratt's forced retirement as superintendent of the Carlisle School on June 30, 1904.

The legacy of Pratt's boarding school programs was controversial among later Indian tribes. Some have labelled the wider American Indian boarding school system, that Pratt began, as a form of cultural genocide that adversely affected their children and families.

== Retirement ==
Pratt retired to his home in Rochester, New York. During his retirement years, he continued to lecture and argue his viewpoints.

== Death ==
Pratt died on March 15, 1924, at the Letterman Army Hospital in present-day San Francisco. He is interred at Arlington National Cemetery in Arlington County, Virginia.

== Representation in other media ==
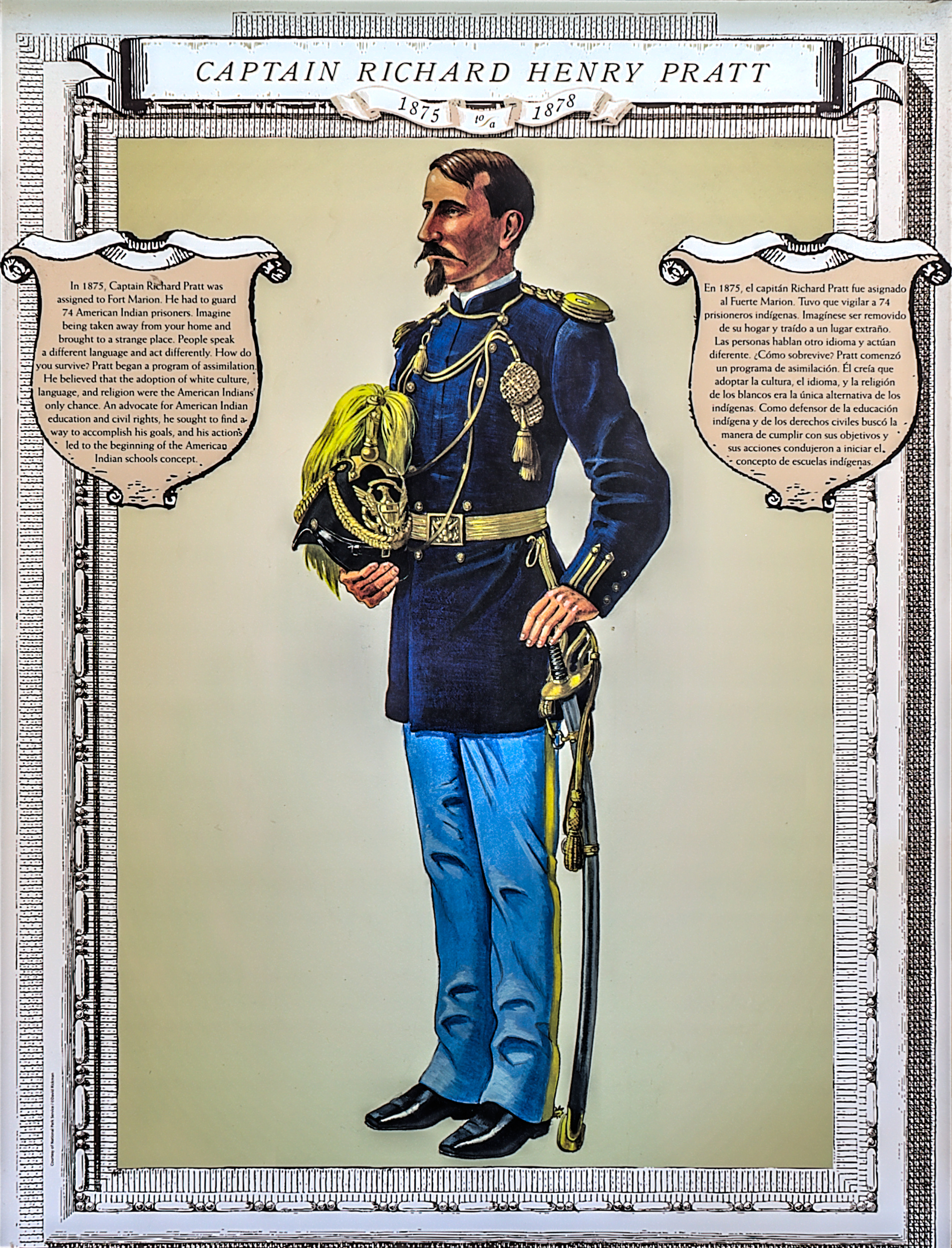
Portrait of Pratt at Castillo de San Marcos

- The television series The Great Adventure featured an episode titled "The Special Courage of Captain Pratt" (1964); the actor Paul Burke portrayed Richard Henry Pratt.
- Wayne Rogers portrayed Pratt in the 1965 episode "The Journey" of the syndicated western television series, Death Valley Days. In the same episode, Robert J. Wilke played Sergeant Wilks, who advocates a more harsh treatment of Indian prisoners than does Pratt. Leonard Nimoy was cast as Yellow Bear.
- In the 2005 miniseries, Into the West, produced by Steven Spielberg and DreamWorks, the unforgiving side of Pratt is shown.
- Pratt's role at the Carlisle School is addressed in the documentary, Our Spirits Don't Speak English (2008).
- A fictionalized Pratt is a prominent character in Tommy Orange's novel Wandering Stars (2024).

== See also ==
- American Indian outing programs
- Kill the Indian, Save the Man: The Genocidal Impact of American Indian Residential Schools

== Bibliography ==
- Pratt, Richard Henry (2004). Battlefield and Classroom: Four Decades with the American Indian, 1867–1904. Norman: University of Oklahoma Press. ISBN 0-8061-3603-0.
- Eastman, Elaine Goodale (1935). Pratt, the Red Man's Moses. Norman: University of Oklahoma Press. LCCN 35021899.
- Haley, James L. (1976). The Buffalo War: The History of the Red River Indian Uprising of 1874. Garden City, New York: Doubleday. ISBN 0-385-06149-8.
- Richard Henry Pratt Papers. Yale Collection of Western Americana, Beinecke Rare Book and Manuscript Library.
