= Robert Knox Thomas =

American anthropologist from Kentucky (1925–1991)

- Born: 1925; Mount Sterling, Kentucky
- Died: 1991 (aged 65–66)
- Occupation: anthropologist
- Known for: Action anthropology, Native American studies

Robert Knox Thomas (1925–1991) was an American anthropologist. Thomas is best known for his practice of action anthropology as a student of Sol Tax at the University of Chicago and is recognized as a major influence in the development of American Indian Studies as an academic field.

== Early life and education ==
Thomas was born in Mount Sterling, Kentucky to Florence and Robert Lee Thomas (1902–1932), who were of Cherokee descent. He grew up in Kentucky and in rural northeastern Oklahoma where his maternal grandparents lived. After completing high school, Thomas enlisted in the United States Army and served in World War II. Afterward, he earned a B.A. in geography and an M.A. in anthropology from the University of Arizona before studying under the prominent anthropologist Sol Tax at the University of Chicago.

== Career ==
While still in university, Thomas edited the special news publication Indian Voices which covered the events of the American Indian Chicago Conference organized by Tax.

From 1963 to 1967, Thomas served as the Field Director for the Carnegie Project among Cherokee groups in Oklahoma where he practiced action anthropology by becoming involved in their political and cultural affairs. This project sought to establish connections with Cherokee groups that spoke the Cherokee language as a first language to promote literacy in English. Sol Tax wished to study the Cherokee acquisition of English as a study of different people's response to globalization, but Thomas wished to use the project to grant to heal the Cherokee people, whom he considered to be a "broken" people. Thomas believed that this project could help the Cherokee wield more political agency in American society without performing cultural assimilation, and the project resulted in the creation of several Cherokee publications and programs.

Similarly, Thomas organized many American Indian Youth Workshops across the United States and Canada to preserve Native cultural identity. He also helped to organize Indian Ecumenical Conferences annually from 1970 to 1982 in Alberta, Canada and helped to establish the Center for Indian Scholars in Vancouver.

Thomas spent the late years of his career as the Director and Professor of American Indian Studies at his alma mater, the University of Arizona, from 1981 until his death in 1991. American historian Steve Pavlik memorialized Thomas as an elder and Cherokee spiritual leader as well as a major contributor to the development of American Indian studies as an academic field.

== Identity ==
Despite priding himself as a classically trained anthropologist in the American tradition, Robert Knox Thomas always considered himself, above all else, a Cherokee. Thomas used his identity and anthropological training to help bridge the gap between Native American peoples and anthropologists by organizing the Chicago Conference and through his participation in the Carnegie Project.

== Death ==
Robert Knox Thomas died in 1991.
