= Bowler, Wisconsin =

- Village
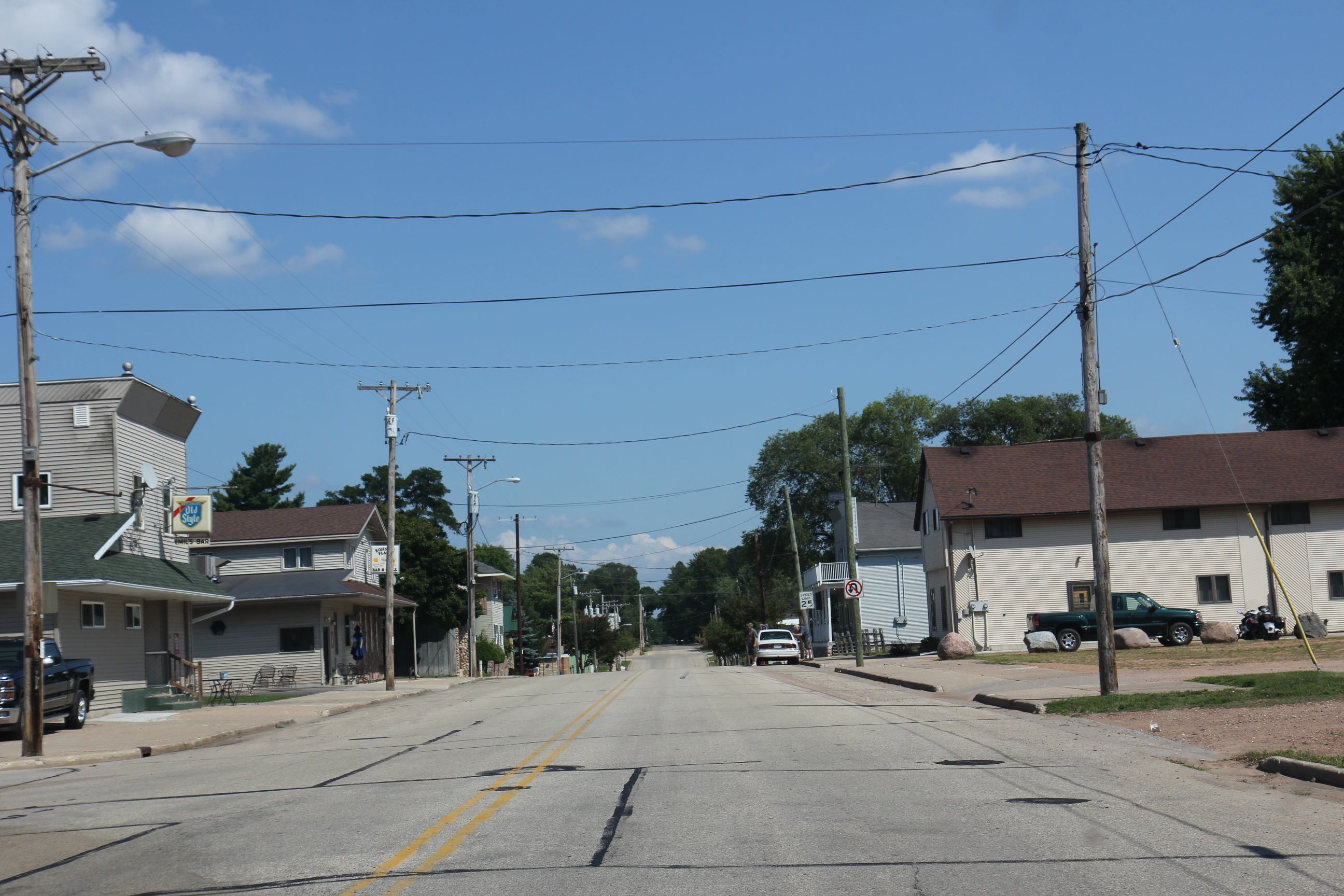
- Downtown Bowler

- Location of Bowler in Shawano County, Wisconsin.
- Coordinates: 44°51′45″N 88°58′51″W
- Country: United States
- State: Wisconsin
- County: Shawano

Area
  - Total: 1.04 sq mi (2.69 km^{2})
  - Land: 1.04 sq mi (2.69 km^{2})
  - Water: 0 sq mi (0.00 km^{2})
- Elevation: 1,073 ft (327 m)

Population (2020)
  - Total: 320
  - Density: 310/sq mi (120/km^{2})
- Time zone: UTC-6 (Central (CST))
  - Summer (DST): UTC-5 (CDT)
- Area codes: 715 & 534
- FIPS code: 55-09025
- GNIS feature ID: 1562100

Bowler is a village in Shawano County, Wisconsin, United States. The population was 320 at the 2020 census.

== History ==
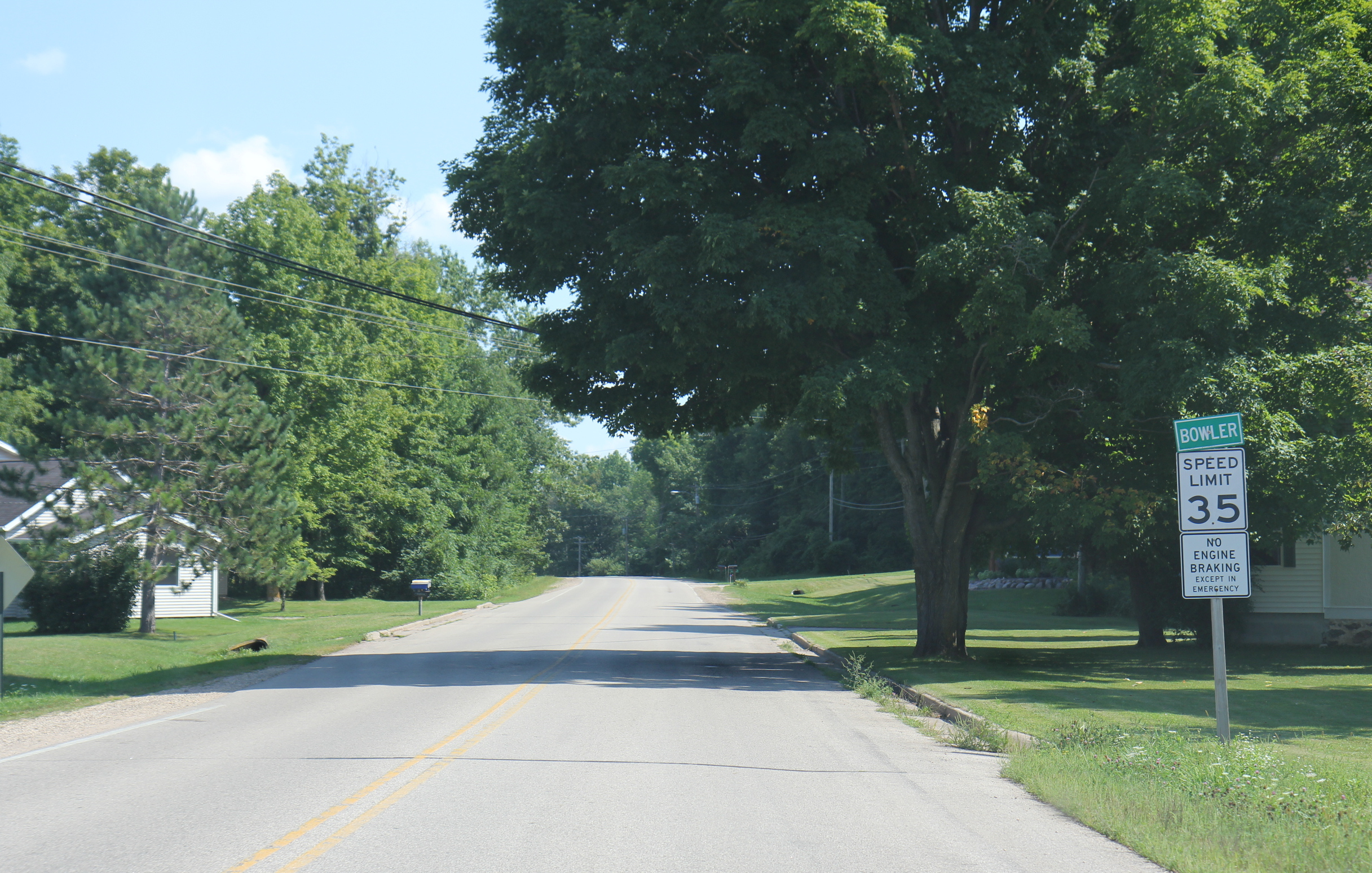
The sign for Bowler

Bowler was named for Col. J. C. Bowler, who owned a tract of land near the town site.

== Geography ==
Bowler is located at 44°51′45″N 88°58′51″W (44.862462, -88.980822).

According to the United States Census Bureau, the village has a total area of 1.02 square miles (2.64 km^{2}), all land.

=== Climate ===
The Köppen Climate Classification subtype for this climate is "Dfb" (Warm Summer Continental Climate).

== Demographics ==
Historical population
Census	Pop.	Note	%±
1930	318		—
1940	315		−0.9%
1950	344		9.2%
1960	274		−20.3%
1970	272		−0.7%
1980	339		24.6%
1990	279		−17.7%
2000	343		22.9%
2010	302		−12.0%
2020	320		6.0%
U.S. Decennial Census

=== 2010 census ===
As of the census of 2010, there were 302 people, 130 households, and 87 families living in the village. The population density was 296.1 inhabitants per square mile (114.3/km^{2}). There were 150 housing units at an average density of 147.1 per square mile (56.8/km^{2}). The racial makeup of the village was 74.5% White, 17.2% Native American, and 8.3% from two or more races. Hispanic or Latino of any race were 3.3% of the population.

There were 130 households, of which 30.8% had children under the age of 18 living with them, 43.8% were married couples living together, 18.5% had a female householder with no husband present, 4.6% had a male householder with no wife present, and 33.1% were non-families. 29.2% of all households were made up of individuals, and 13.9% had someone living alone who was 65 years of age or older. The average household size was 2.32 and the average family size was 2.85.

The median age in the village was 41.7 years. 23.5% of residents were under the age of 18; 7.9% were between the ages of 18 and 24; 23.6% were from 25 to 44; 27.1% were from 45 to 64; and 17.9% were 65 years of age or older. The gender makeup of the village was 47.4% male and 52.6% female.

=== 2000 census ===
As of the census of 2000, there were 343 people, 126 households, and 90 families living in the village. The population density was 337.7 people per square mile (129.8/km^{2}). There were 135 housing units at an average density of 132.9 per square mile (51.1/km^{2}). The racial makeup of the village was 78.13% White, 0.87% African American, 16.62% Native American, and 4.37% from two or more races. 0.00% of the population were Hispanic or Latino of any race.

There were 126 households, out of which 42.1% had children under the age of 18 living with them, 49.2% were married couples living together, 18.3% had a female householder with no husband present, and 27.8% were non-families. 24.6% of all households were made up of individuals, and 12.7% had someone living alone who was 65 years of age or older. The average household size was 2.62 and the average family size was 3.11.

In the village, the population was spread out, with 33.2% under the age of 18, 8.7% from 18 to 24, 25.1% from 25 to 44, 20.1% from 45 to 64, and 12.8% who were 65 years of age or older. The median age was 34 years. For every 100 females, there were 80.5 males. For every 100 females age 18 and over, there were 81.7 males.

The median income for a household in the village was $34,167, and the median income for a family was $36,563. Males had a median income of $24,375 versus $20,000 for females. The per capita income for the village was $13,285. 6.6% of the population and 3.4% of families were below the poverty line. Out of the total population, 9.0% of those under the age of 18 and 23.5% of those 65 and older were living below the poverty line.

== Notable people ==
- Paul T. Fuhrman, Wisconsin State Representative and businessman lived in Bowler; Fuhrman served as village president of Bowler.
- Skip Jones, a Bowler-based folk musician, storyteller and educator; Jones advocates for clean water, social harmony, and the old family values of shared music and time tested wisdom.
- Dan Terrio, national motivational speaker, Native American youth activist and current Milwaukee County, WI Diversity, Equity, and Inclusion Officer. Terrio made Milwaukee County, WI history as the first Native American director in county history and the highest ranking “two-spirit” person in the state of Wisconsin.
