= History of Manhattan =

History of New York City borough

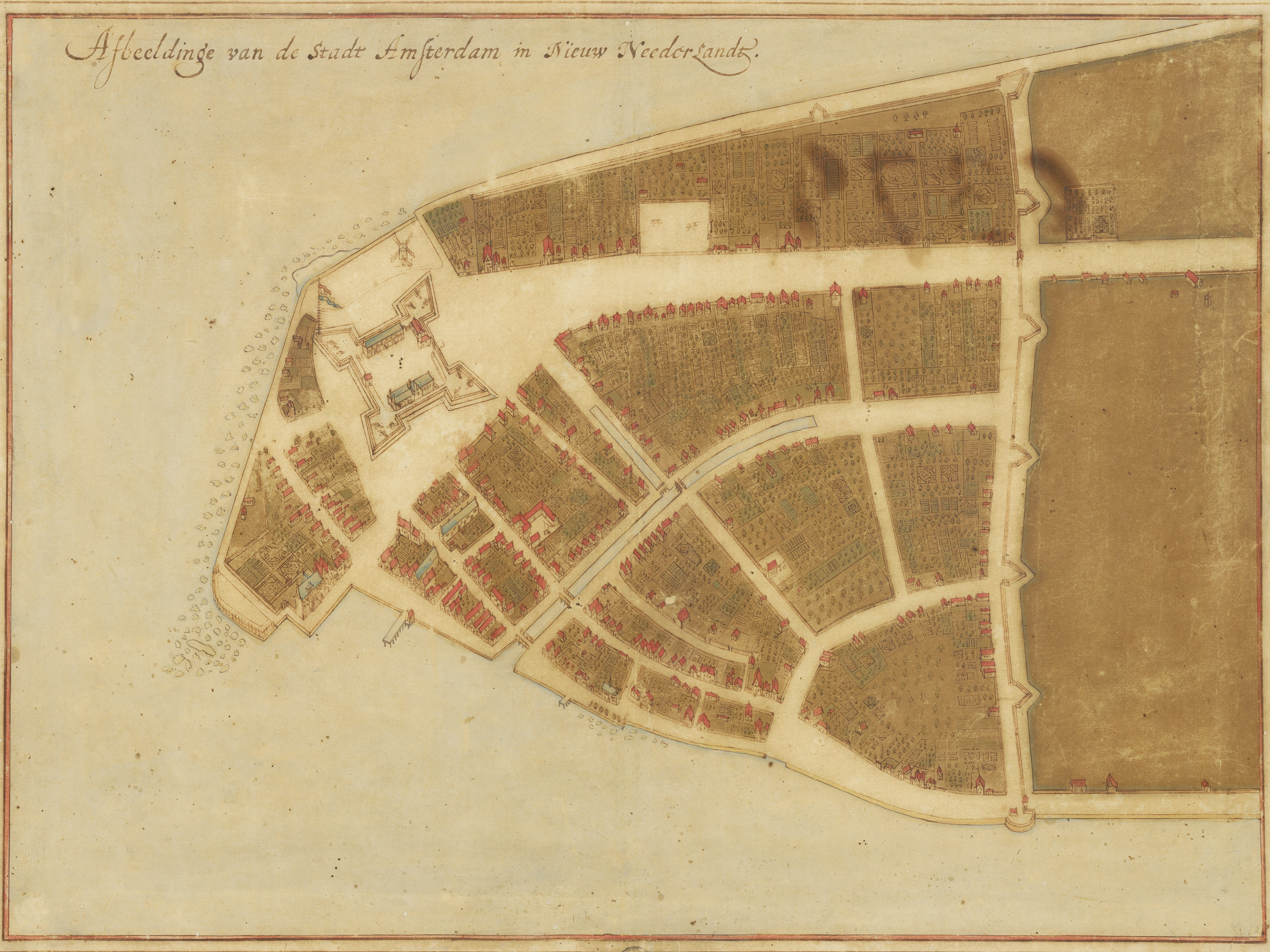
The Castello Plan, a 1660 map of New Amsterdam (the top right corner is roughly north) in Lower Manhattan

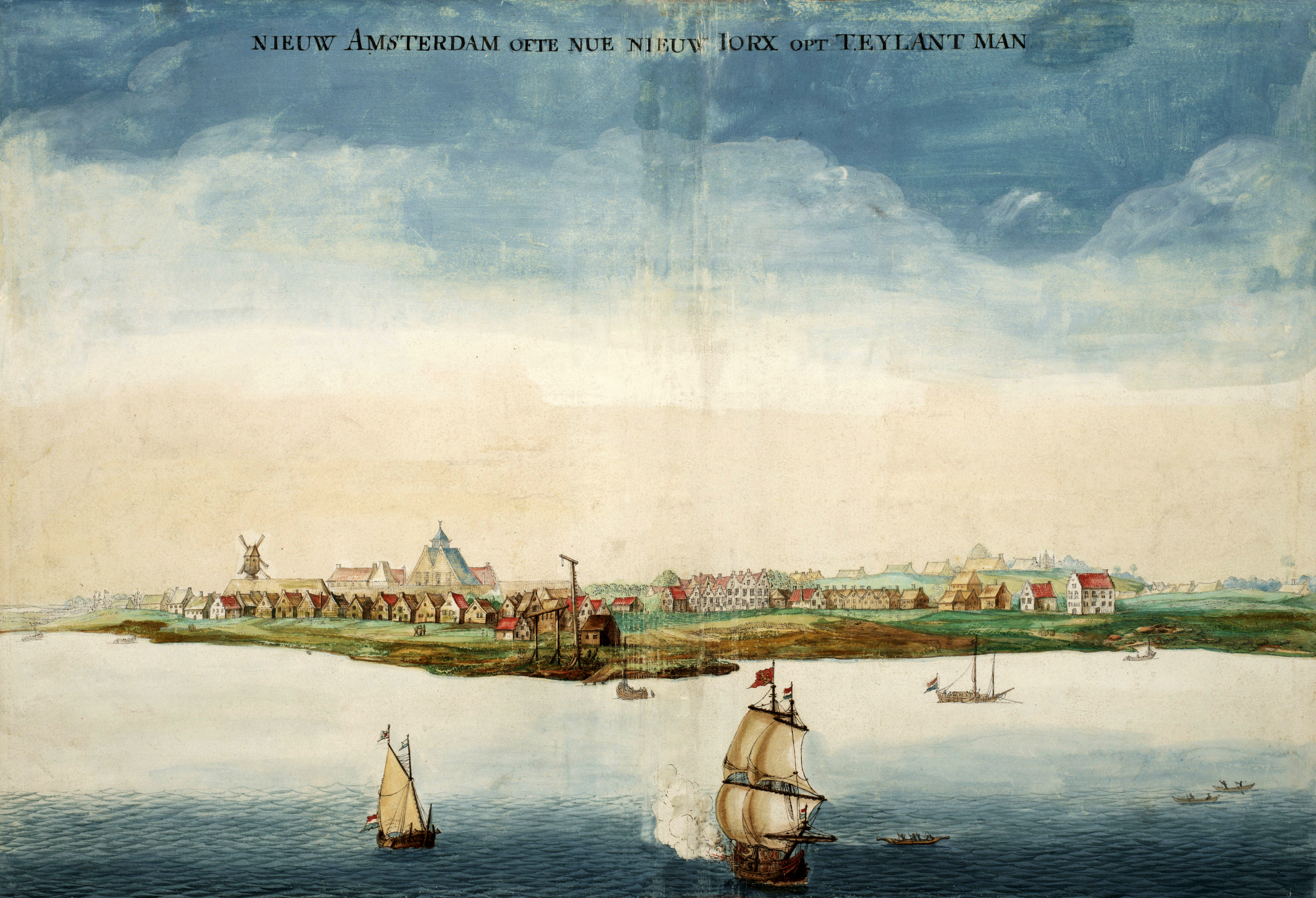
New Amsterdam, centered in what eventually became Lower Manhattan, in 1664, the year England took control and renamed it New York

The area of present-day Manhattan was originally part of Lenape territory. European settlement began with the establishment of a trading post founded by colonists from the Dutch Republic in 1624 on Lower Manhattan; the post was named New Amsterdam in 1626. The territory and its surroundings came under English control in 1664 and were renamed New York after King Charles II of England granted the lands to his brother, the Duke of York. New York, based in present-day Manhattan, served as the capital of the United States from 1785 until 1790. The Statue of Liberty in New York Harbor greeted millions of immigrants as they came to America by ship in the late 19th century and is a world symbol of the United States and its ideals of liberty and peace. Manhattan became a borough during the consolidation of New York City in 1898.

== Etymology ==
The name Manhattan originated from the Lenapes language, Munsee, manaháhtaan (where manah- means "gather", -aht- means "bow", and -aan is an abstract element used to form verb stems). The Lenape word has been translated as "the place where we get bows" or "place for gathering the (wood to make) bows".

According to a Munsee tradition recorded by Albert Seqaqkind Anthony in the 19th century, the island was named so for a grove of hickory trees at its southern end that was considered ideal for the making of bows. It was first recorded in writing as Manna-hata, in the 1609 logbook of Robert Juet, an officer on Henry Hudson's yacht Halve Maen (Half Moon).

A 1610 map depicts the name Manna-hata twice, on both the east and west sides of the Mauritius River, later named the North River and ultimately the Hudson River. Alternative etymologies in folklore include "island of many hills", "the island where we all became intoxicated" and simply "island", as well as a phrase descriptive of the whirlpool at Hell Gate. It is thought that the term Manhattoe may originally have referred only to a location at the southern tip of the island before eventually signifying the entire island to the Dutch through pars pro toto.

== Lenape settlement ==
Manhattan was historically part of the Lenapehoking territory inhabited by the Munsee Lenape and Wappinger tribes. There were several Lenape settlements in the area of Manhattan including Sapohanikan, Nechtanc, and Konaande Kongh that were interconnected by a series of trails. The primary trail on the island ran from what is now Inwood in the north to Battery Park in the south. There were various sites for fishing and planting established by the Lenape throughout Manhattan. The 48-acre (19 ha) Collect Pond, which fed the fresh water streams and marshes around it, was also an important meeting and trading location for the people in the area.

== Colonial era ==
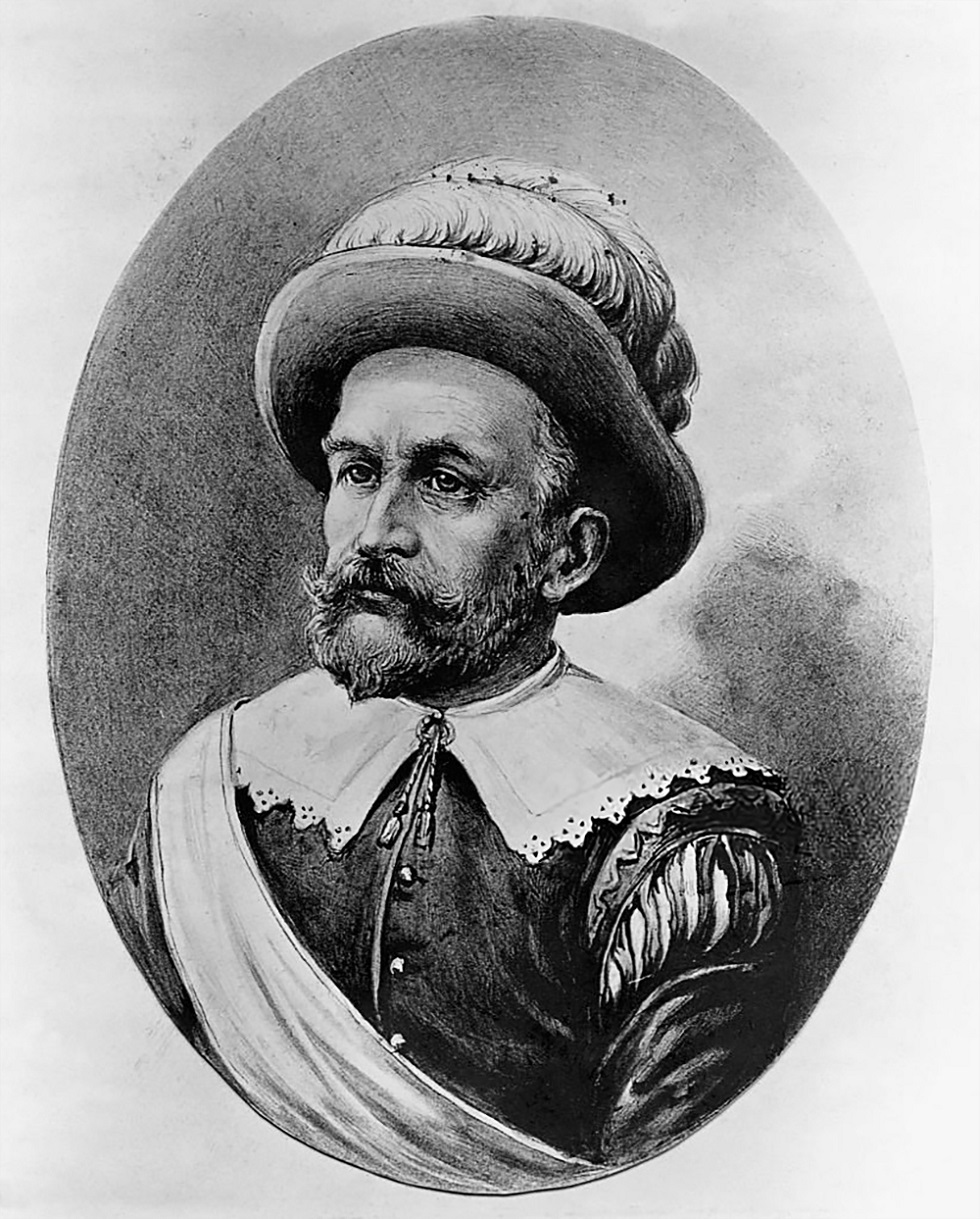
Peter Minuit, who founded New Sweden in 1638

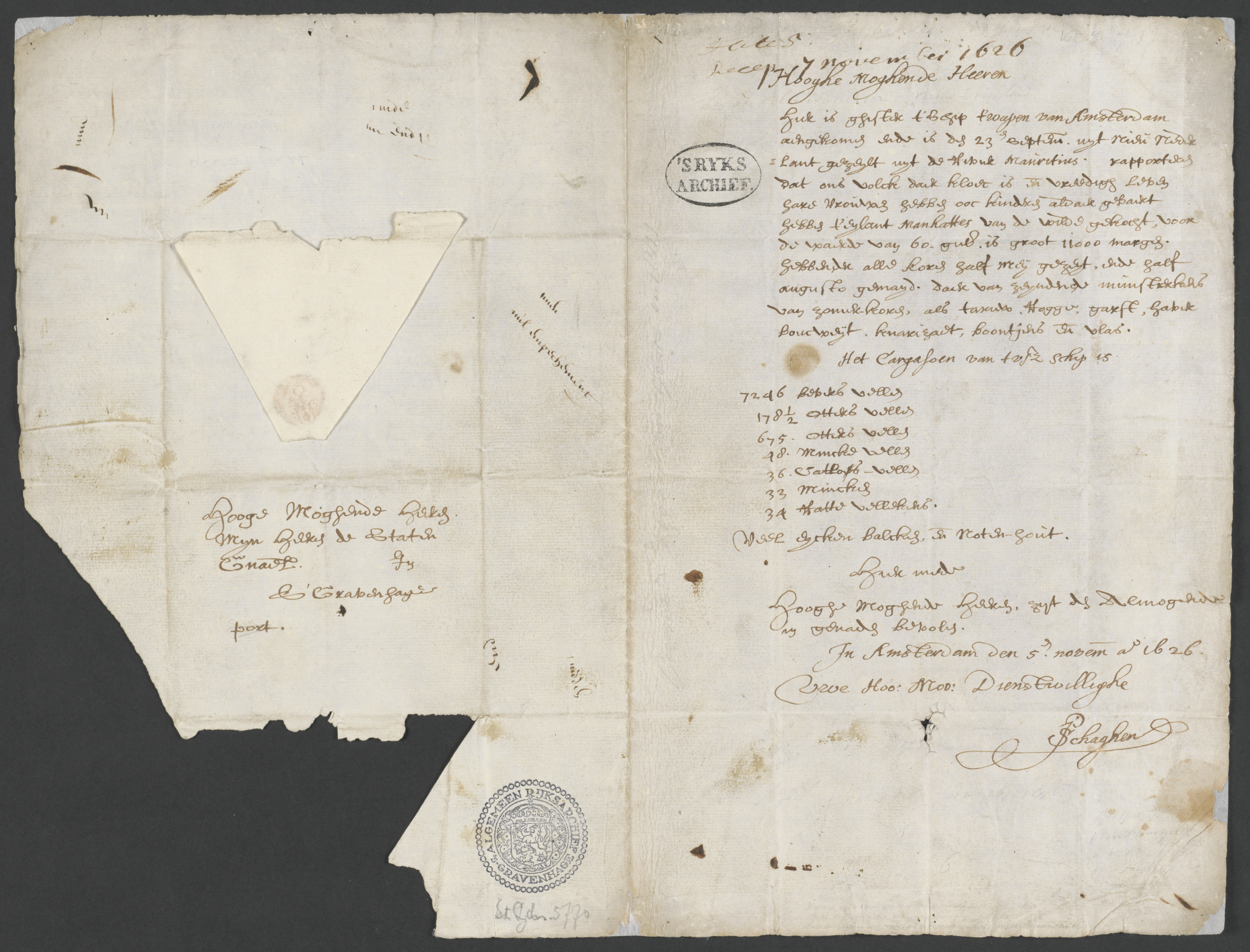
Pieter Schaghen's 1626 letter saying Manhattan had been purchased for 60 Dutch guilders

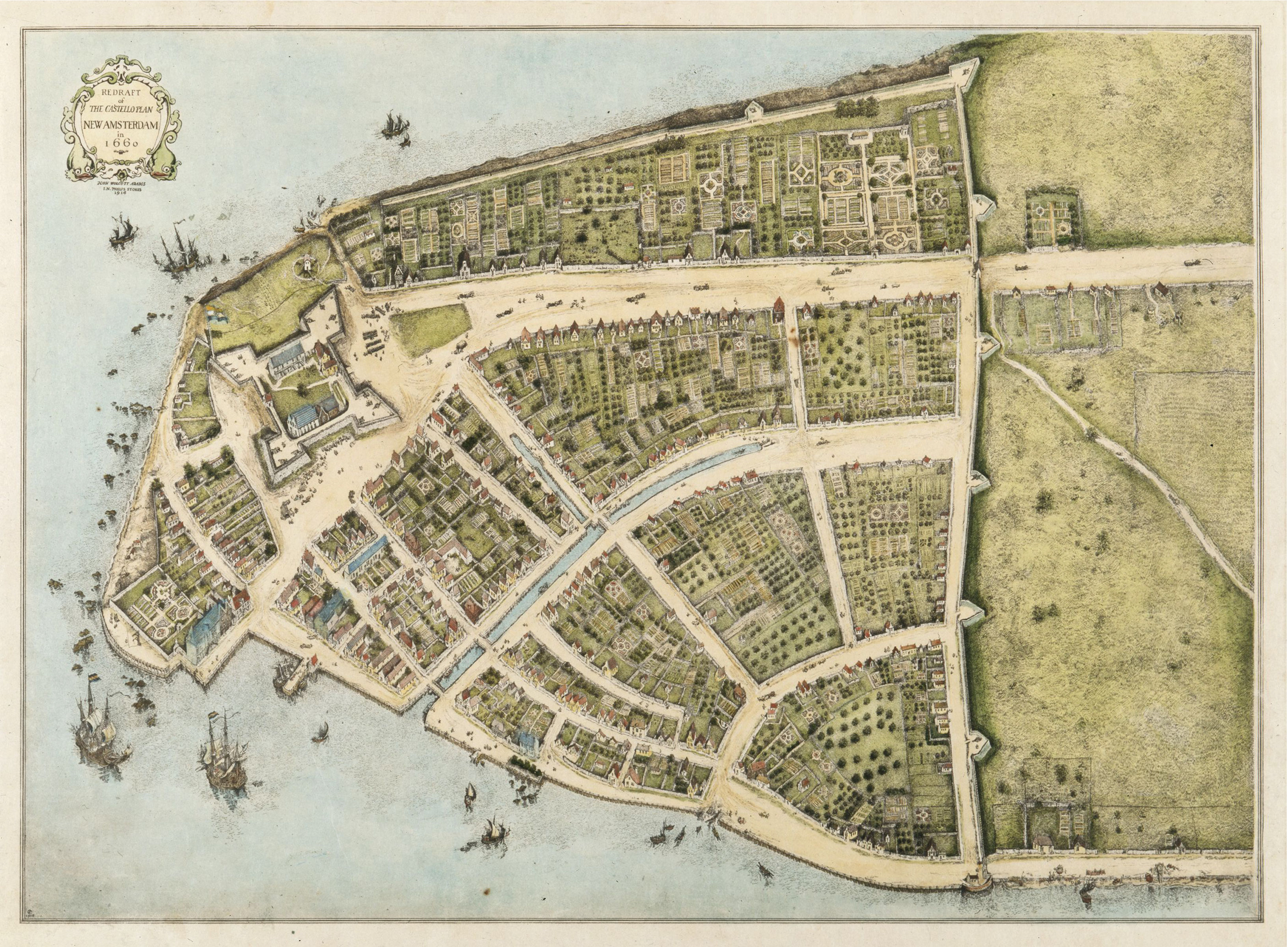
Redraft of the Castello Plan (drawn in 1916) showing the Dutch city of New Amsterdam at Manhattan's southern tip in 1660

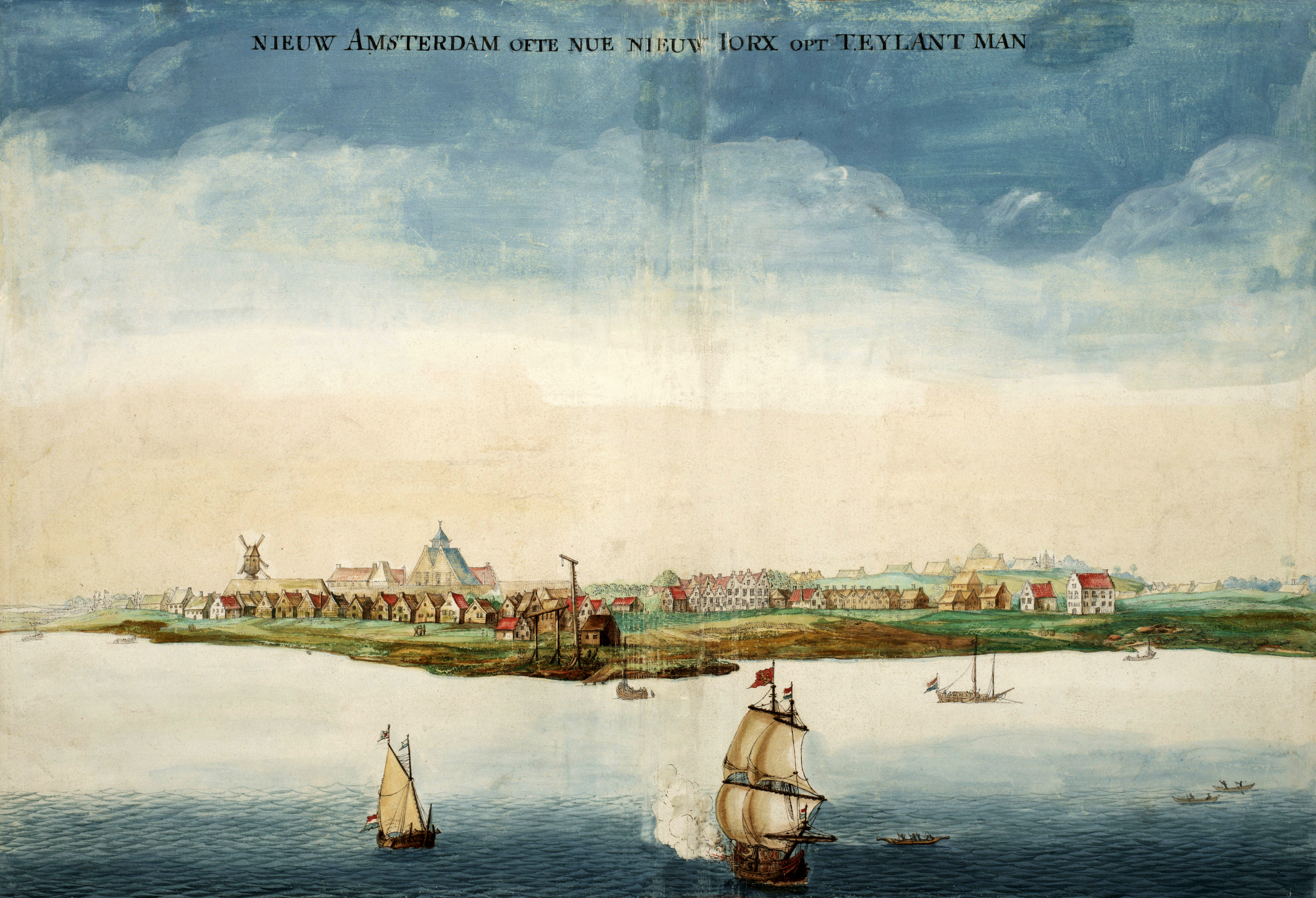
New Amsterdam centered in what eventually became Lower Manhattan in 1664, the year England took control and renamed it New York

In 1524, Florentine explorer Giovanni da Verrazzano, sailing in service of King Francis I of France, became the first documented European to visit the area that would become New York City. Verrazzano entered the tidal strait now known as The Narrows and named the land around Upper New York Harbor New Angoulême, in reference to the family name of King Francis I that was derived from Angoulême in France; he sailed far enough into the harbor to sight the Hudson River, which he referred to in his report to the French king as a "very big river"; and he named the Bay of Santa Margarita – what is now Upper New York Bay – after Marguerite de Navarre, the elder sister of the king.

Manhattan was first mapped during a 1609 voyage of Henry Hudson, an Englishman who worked for the Dutch East India Company. Hudson came across Manhattan Island and the native people living there, and continued up the river that would later bear his name, the Hudson River, until he arrived at the site of present-day Albany.

A permanent European presence in New Netherland began in 1624, with the founding of a Dutch fur trading settlement on Governors Island. In 1625, construction was started on the citadel of Fort Amsterdam on Manhattan Island, later called New Amsterdam (Nieuw Amsterdam), in what is now Lower Manhattan. The 1625 establishment of Fort Amsterdam at the southern tip of Manhattan Island is recognized as the birth of New York City.

According to a letter by Pieter Janszoon Schagen, Peter Minuit and Walloon colonists of the West India Company acquired the island of Manhattan on May 24, 1626, from unnamed native people, who are believed to have been Canarsee Indians of the Manhattoe, in exchange for traded goods worth 60 guilders, often said to be worth US$24. In actuality, 60 guilders in that time was worth 2,400 English pennies. According to the writer Nathaniel Benchley, Minuit conducted the transaction with Seyseys, chief of the Canarsee, who were willing to accept valuable merchandise in exchange for the island that was mostly controlled by the Weckquaesgeeks, a band of the Wappinger.

In 1647, Peter Stuyvesant was appointed as the last Dutch Director-General of the colony. New Amsterdam was formally incorporated as a city on February 2, 1653. In 1664, the English conquered New Netherland and renamed it New York after the English Duke of York and Albany, the future King James II. The Dutch, under Director General Stuyvesant, successfully negotiated with the English to produce 24 articles of provisional transfer, which sought to retain for the extant citizens of New Netherland their previously attained liberties (including freedom of religion) under their new English rulers.

The Dutch Republic re-captured the city in August 1673, renaming it "New Orange". New Netherland was ultimately ceded to the English in November 1674 through the Treaty of Westminster.

== American Revolution and the early United States ==
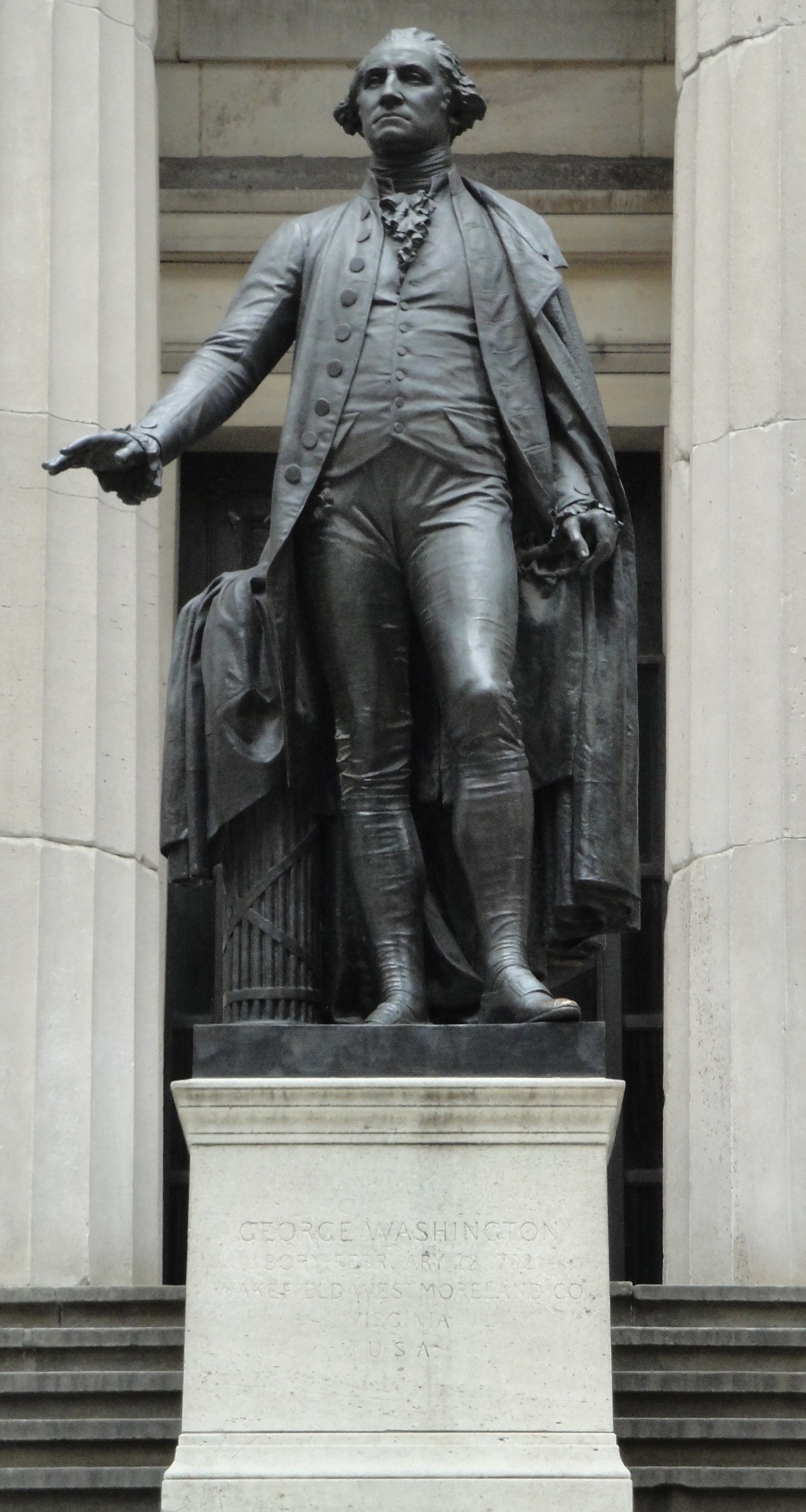
Washington's statue in front of Federal Hall on Wall Street, where in 1789 he was sworn in as the first U.S. president

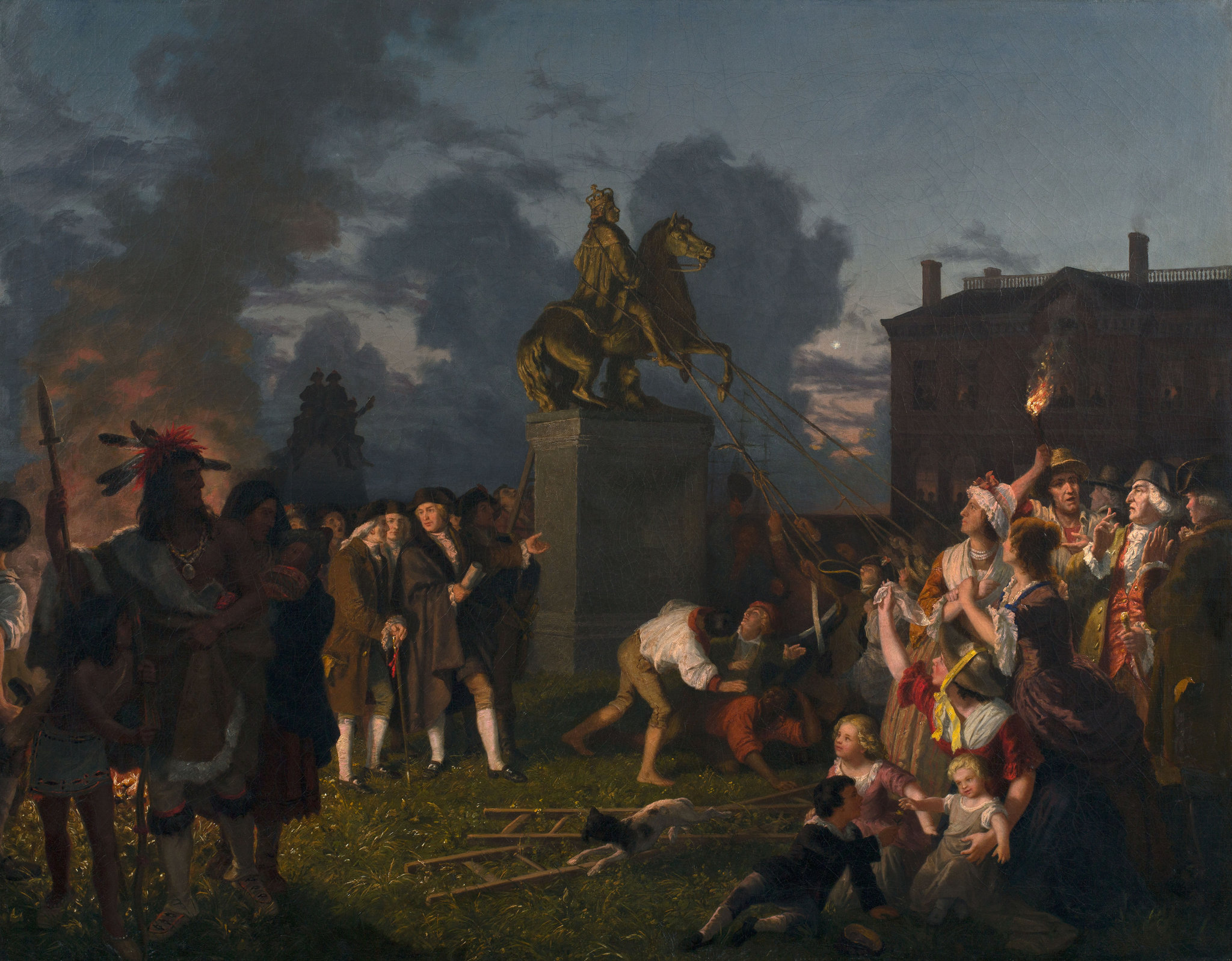
The Statue of King George III located at Bowling Green at the southern tip of Manhattan was pulled down on July 9, 1776, following the first public reading of the Declaration of Independence in New York City.

On July 9, 1776, George Washington's aid read the United States Declaration of Independence to his troops and the citizens of New York, who later stormed to Bowling Green, where there stood a statue of King George III, then proceeded to tie ropes to the statue and yanked it off its pedestal and shipped its remains to Litchfield, Connecticut, where most of the lead from the statue was turned into 42,000 musketballs for the Continental Army. In the process, finials on the tops of the fence that was built along the perimeter of Bowling Green to protect the statue depicting the royal symbol of a crown were sawed off, the fence remains standing to this very day and the uneven hack marks where the crown finials used to be are present. Manhattan was at the heart of the New York Campaign, a series of major battles in the early stages of the American Revolutionary War.

The Continental Army was forced to abandon Manhattan after the Battle of Fort Washington on November 16, 1776. The city, greatly damaged by the Great Fire of New York during the campaign, became the British military and political center of operations in North America for the remainder of the war. The military center for the colonists was established in neighboring New Jersey. British occupation lasted until November 25, 1783, when George Washington returned to Manhattan, as the last British forces left the city.

From January 11, 1785, to the fall of 1788, New York City was the fifth of five capitals of the United States under the Articles of Confederation, with the Continental Congress meeting at New York City Hall (then at Fraunces Tavern). New York was the first capital under the newly enacted Constitution of the United States, from March 4, 1789, to August 12, 1790, at Federal Hall. Federal Hall was also the site where the United States Supreme Court met for the first time, the United States Bill of Rights were drafted and ratified, and where the Northwest Ordinance was adopted, establishing measures for adding new states to the Union.

== 19th century ==
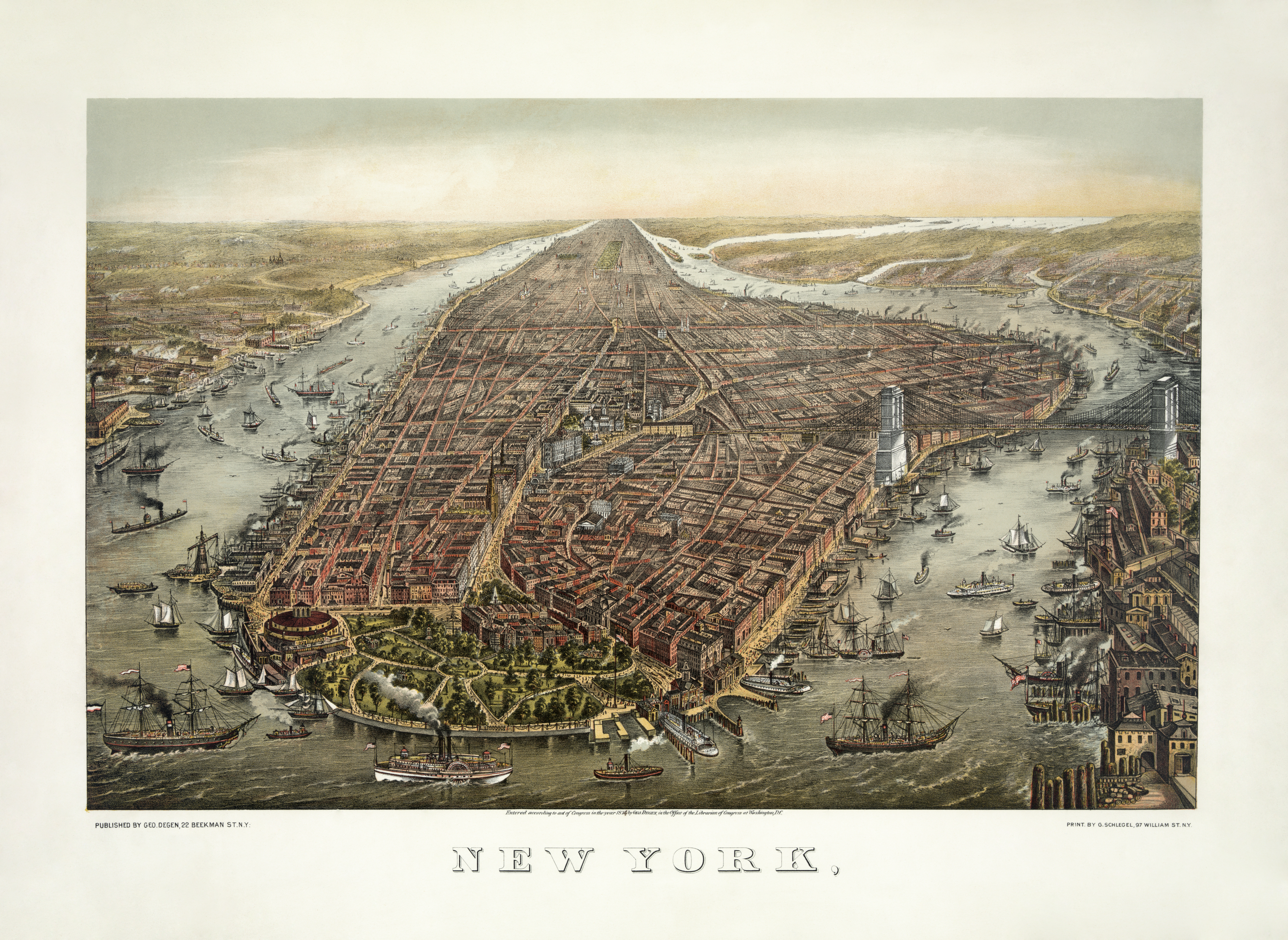
Manhattan in 1873; the Brooklyn Bridge, connecting Manhattan with Brooklyn, was constructed between 1870 and 1883.

New York grew as an economic center, first as a result of Alexander Hamilton's policies and practices as the first Secretary of the Treasury and, later, with the opening of the Erie Canal in 1825, which connected the Atlantic port to the vast agricultural markets of the Midwestern United States and Canada. By 1810, New York City, then confined to Manhattan, had surpassed Philadelphia as the largest city in the United States. The Commissioners' Plan of 1811 laid out the island of Manhattan in its familiar grid plan.

Tammany Hall, a Democratic Party political machine, began to grow in influence with the support of many of the immigrant Irish, culminating in the election of the first Tammany mayor, Fernando Wood, in 1854. Tammany Hall dominated local politics for decades. Central Park, which opened to the public in 1858, became the first landscaped public park in an American city.

New York City played a complex role in the American Civil War. The city's strong commercial ties to the southern United States existed for many reasons, including the industrial power of the Hudson River, which allowed trade with stops such as the West Point Foundry, one of the great manufacturing operations in the early United States; and the city's Atlantic Ocean ports, rendering New York City the American powerhouse in terms of industrial trade between the northern and southern United States. Anger arose about conscription, with resentment at those who could afford to pay $300 to avoid service leading to resentment against Lincoln's war policies and fomenting paranoia about free Blacks taking the poor immigrants' jobs, culminating in the three-day-long New York Draft Riots of July 1863. This was among the worst incidents of civil disorder in American history, with over 100 people killed by the rioters or by the military units that stopped the riot.

The rate of immigration from Europe grew steeply after the Civil War, and Manhattan became the first stop for millions seeking a new life in the United States, a role acknowledged by the dedication of the Statue of Liberty on October 28, 1886, a gift from the people of France. New York's growing immigrant population, which had earlier consisted mainly of German and Irish immigrants, began in the late 1800s to include waves of impoverished Italians and Central and Eastern European Jews flowing in en masse. This new European immigration brought further social upheaval. In a city of tenements packed with poorly paid laborers from dozens of nations, the city became a hotbed of revolution (including anarchists and communists among others), syndicalism, racketeering, and unionization.

In 1883, the opening of the Brooklyn Bridge established a road connection to Brooklyn, across the East River. In 1874, the western portion of the present Bronx County was transferred to New York County from Westchester County, and in 1895 the remainder of the present Bronx County was annexed. In 1898, when New York City consolidated with three neighboring counties to form "the City of Greater New York", Manhattan and the Bronx, though still one county, were established as two separate boroughs. On January 1, 1914, the New York State Legislature created Bronx County and New York County was reduced to its present boundaries.

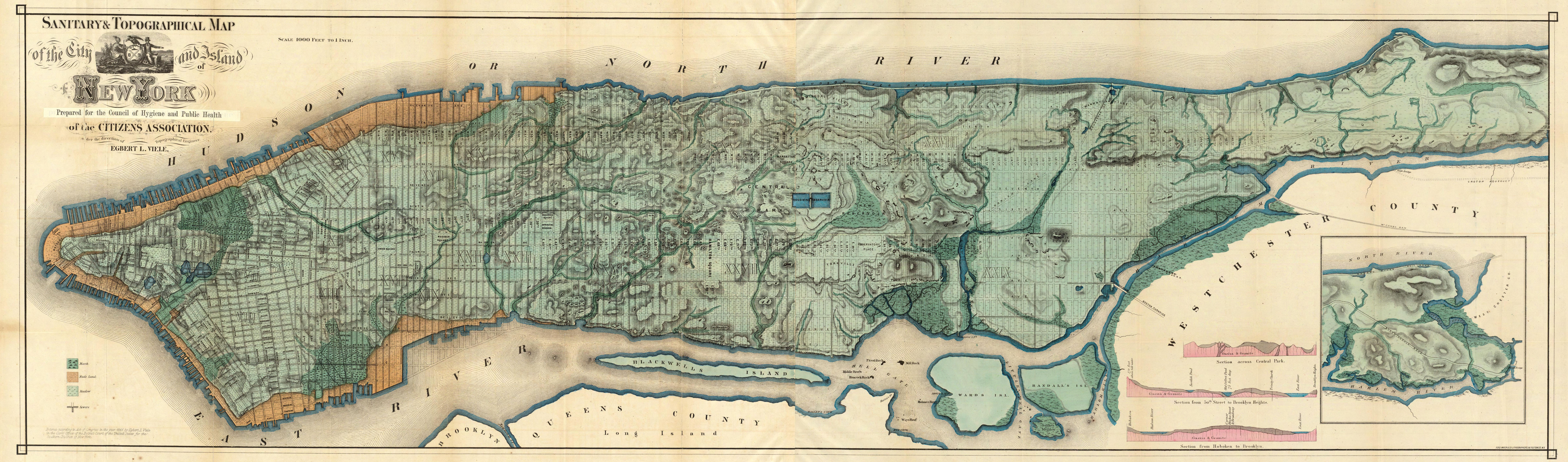
The "Sanitary & Topographical Map of the City and Island of New York", commonly known as the Viele Map, developed by Egbert Ludovicus Viele in 1865

== 20th century ==
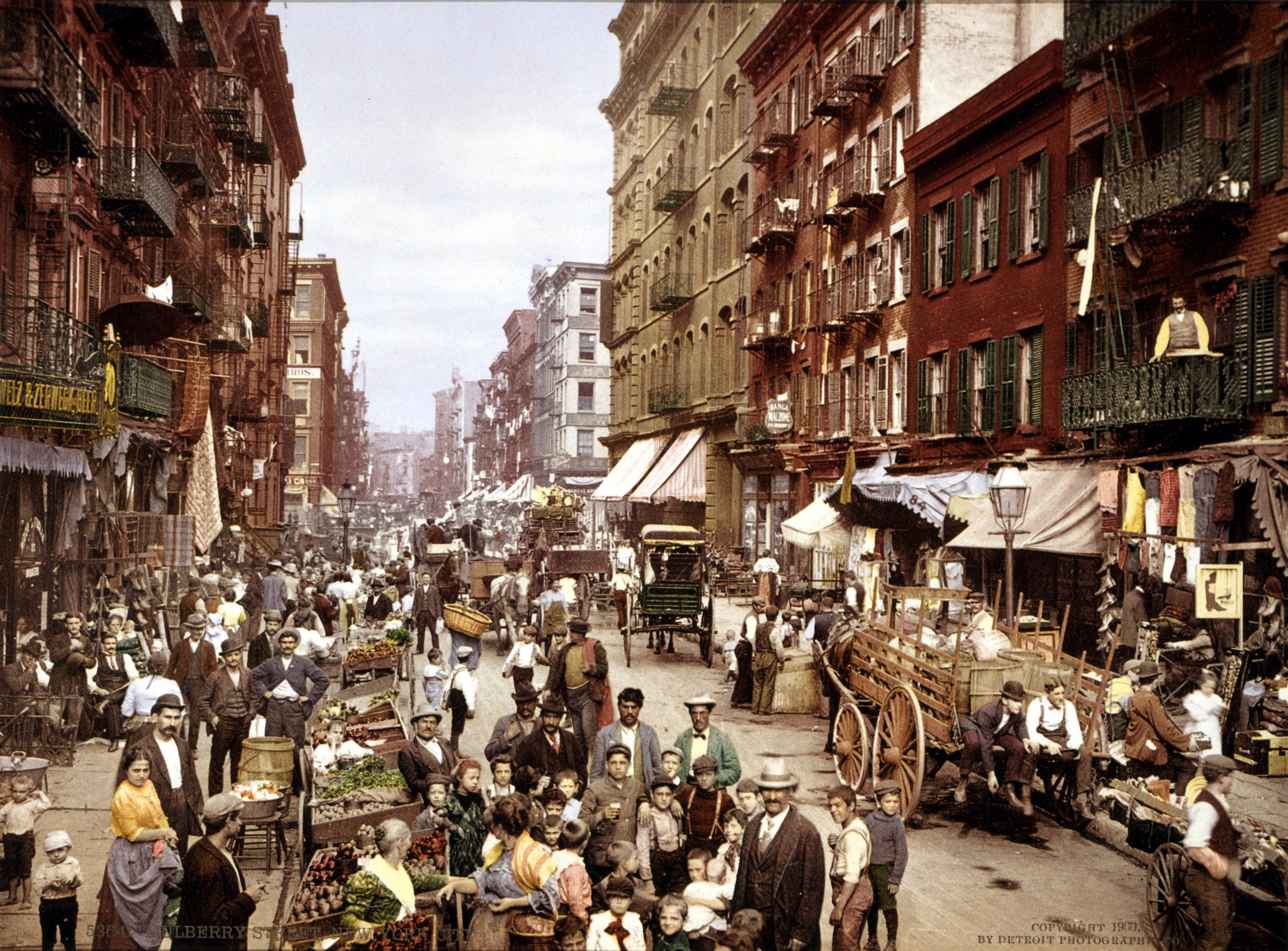
Manhattan's Little Italy on the Lower East Side, c. 1900

The construction of the New York City Subway, which opened in 1904, helped bind the consolidated city together, as did additional bridges to Brooklyn snd Queens. In the 1920s Manhattan experienced large arrivals of African-Americans as part of the Great Migration from the southern United States, and the Harlem Renaissance, part of a larger boom time in the Prohibition era that included new skyscrapers competing for the skyline. New York City became the most populous city in the world in 1925, overtaking London, which had reigned for a century. Manhattan's majority white ethnic group declined from 98.7% in 1900 to 58.3% by 1990.

On March 25, 1911, the Triangle Shirtwaist Factory fire in Greenwich Village killed 146 garment workers. The disaster eventually led to overhauls of the city's fire department, building codes, and workplace regulations.

The period between the World War I and World War II saw the election of reformist mayor Fiorello La Guardia and the fall of Tammany Hall after 80 years of political dominance. As the city's demographics stabilized, labor unionization brought new protections and affluence to the working class, the city's government and infrastructure underwent a dramatic overhaul under La Guardia.

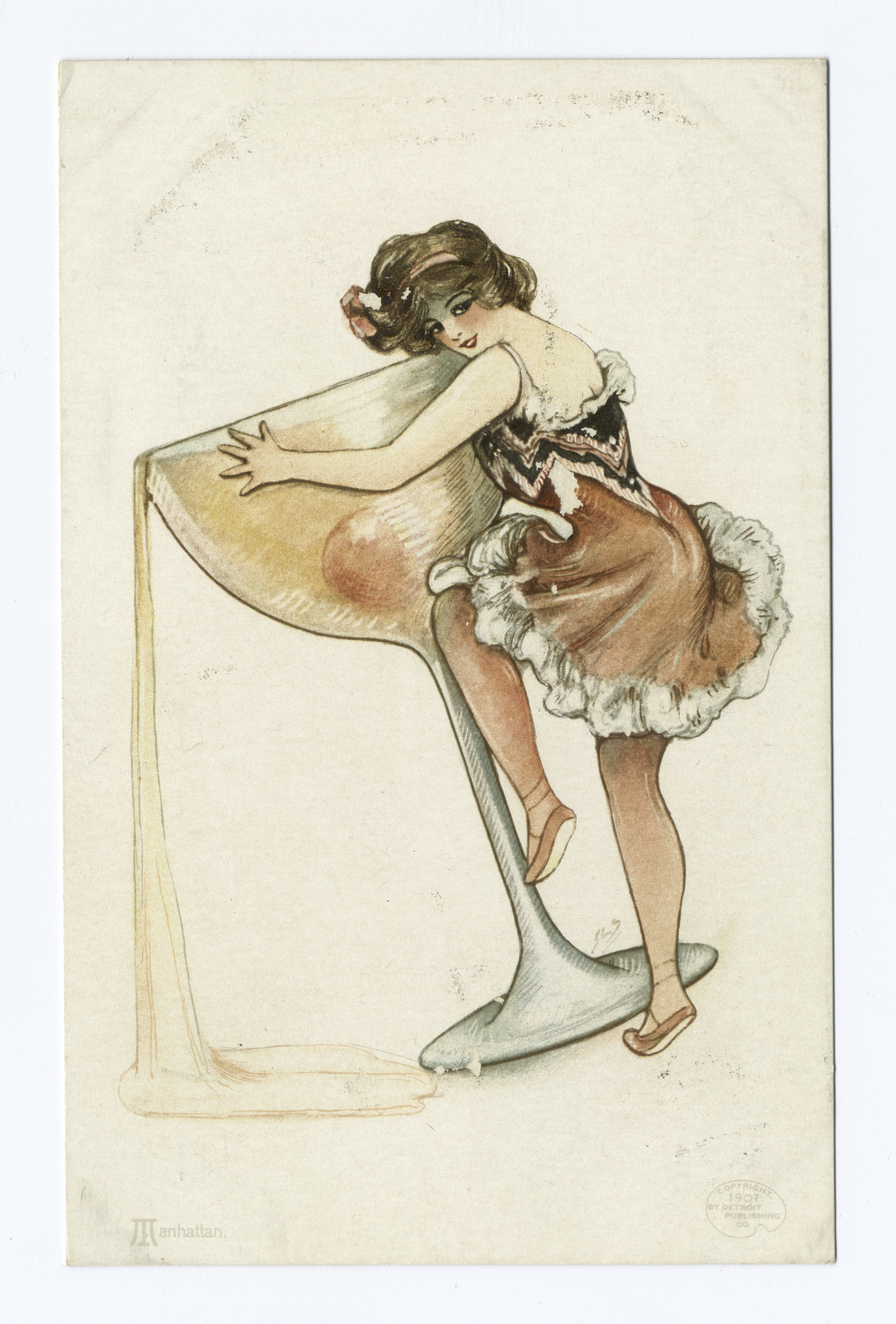
Manhattan personified in the early 20th century

Despite the Great Depression, some of the world's tallest skyscrapers were completed in Manhattan during the 1930s, including numerous Art Deco masterpieces that are still part of the city's skyline, most notably the Empire State Building, the Chrysler Building, and the 30 Rockefeller Plaza.

Returning World War II veterans created a postwar economic boom, which led to the development of huge housing developments targeted at returning veterans, the largest being Peter Cooper Village-Stuyvesant Town, which opened in 1947. In 1951–1952, the United Nations relocated to a new headquarters the East Side of Manhattan.

The Stonewall riots were a series of spontaneous, violent protests by members of the gay community against a police raid that took place in the early morning hours of June 28, 1969, at the Stonewall Inn in the Greenwich Village neighborhood of Lower Manhattan. They are widely considered to constitute the single most important event leading to the gay liberation movement and the modern fight for LGBT rights.

In the 1970s, job losses due to industrial restructuring caused New York City, including Manhattan, to suffer from economic problems and rising crime rates. While a resurgence in the financial industry greatly improved the city's economic health in the 1980s, New York's crime rate continued to increase through the decade and into the beginning of the 1990s.

The 1980s saw a rebirth of Wall Street, and Manhattan reclaimed its role at the center of the worldwide financial industry. The 1980s also saw Manhattan at the heart of the AIDS crisis, with Greenwich Village at its epicenter. The organizations Gay Men's Health Crisis (GMHC) and AIDS Coalition to Unleash Power (ACT UP) were founded to advocate on behalf of those stricken with the disease.

By the 1990s, crime rates started to drop dramatically due to revised police strategies, improving economic opportunities, gentrification, and new residents, both American transplants and new immigrants from Asia and Latin America. Murder rates that had reached 2,245 in 1990 plummeted to 537 by 2008, and the crack epidemic and its associated drug-related violence came under greater control. The outflow of population turned around, as the city once again became the destination of immigrants from around the world, joining with low interest rates and Wall Street bonuses to fuel the growth of the real estate market. Important new sectors, such as Silicon Alley, emerged in Manhattan's economy.

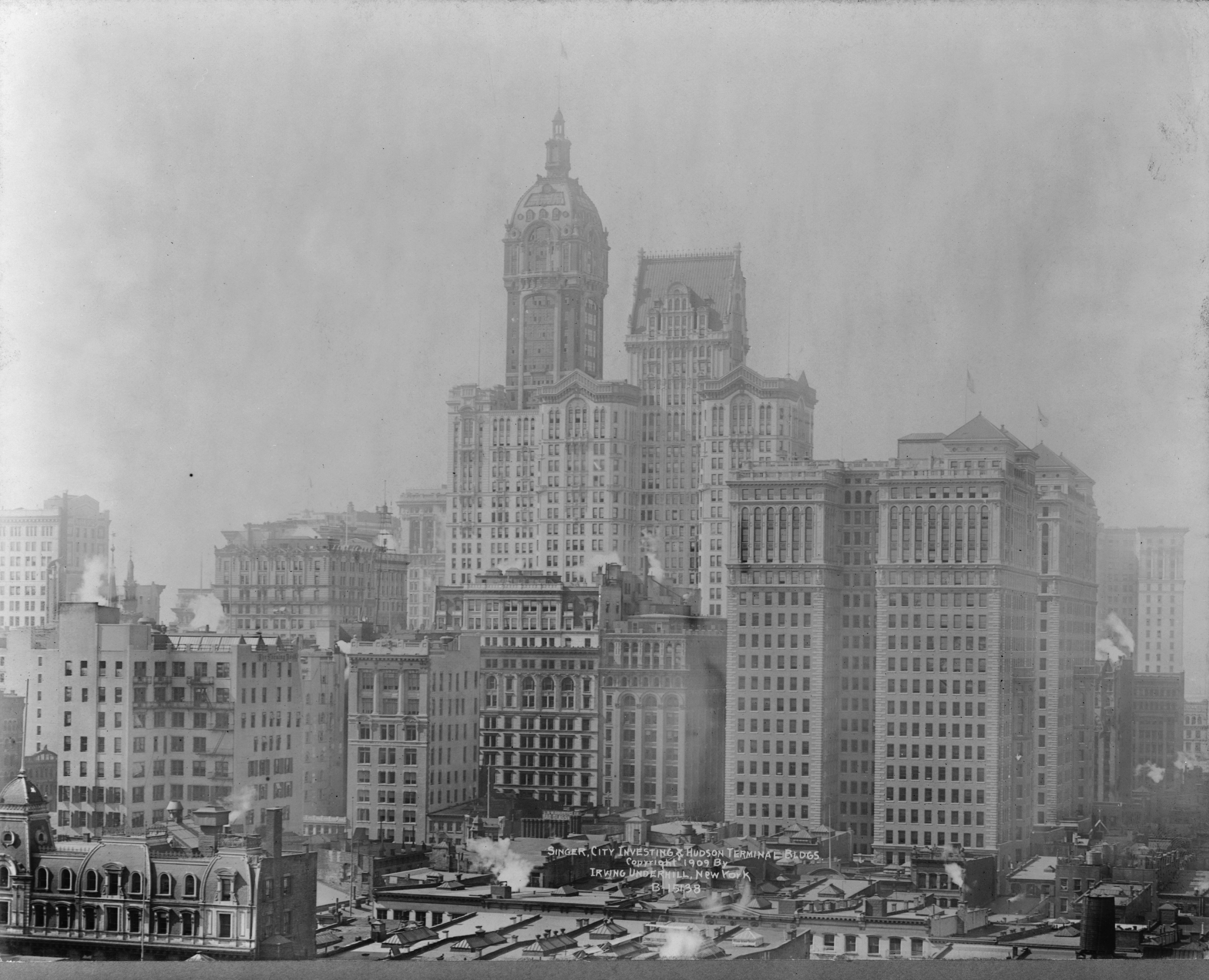
The newly completed Singer Building towering above the city, 1909

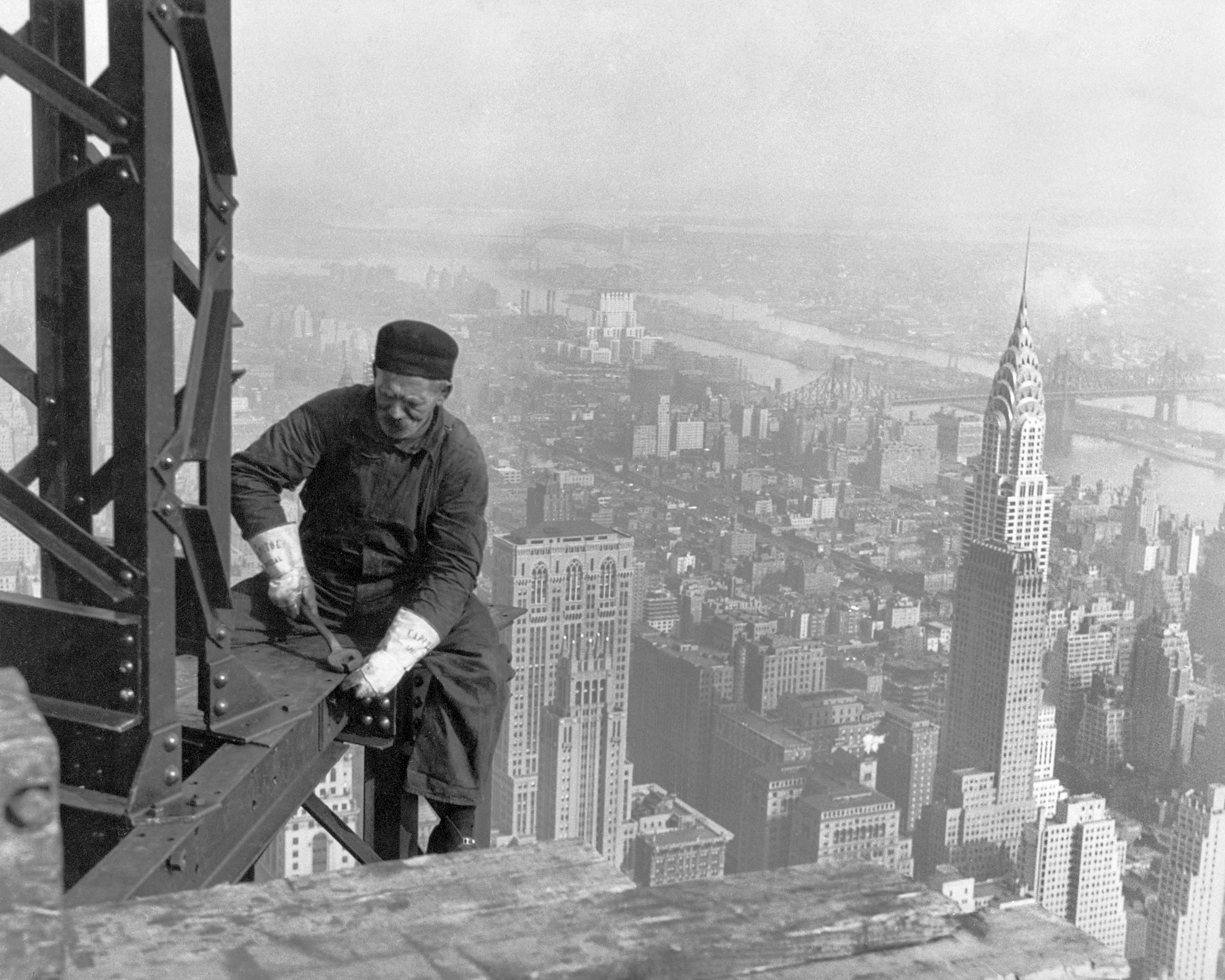
A construction worker atop the Empire State Building as it was being built in 1930; to the right is the Chrysler Building

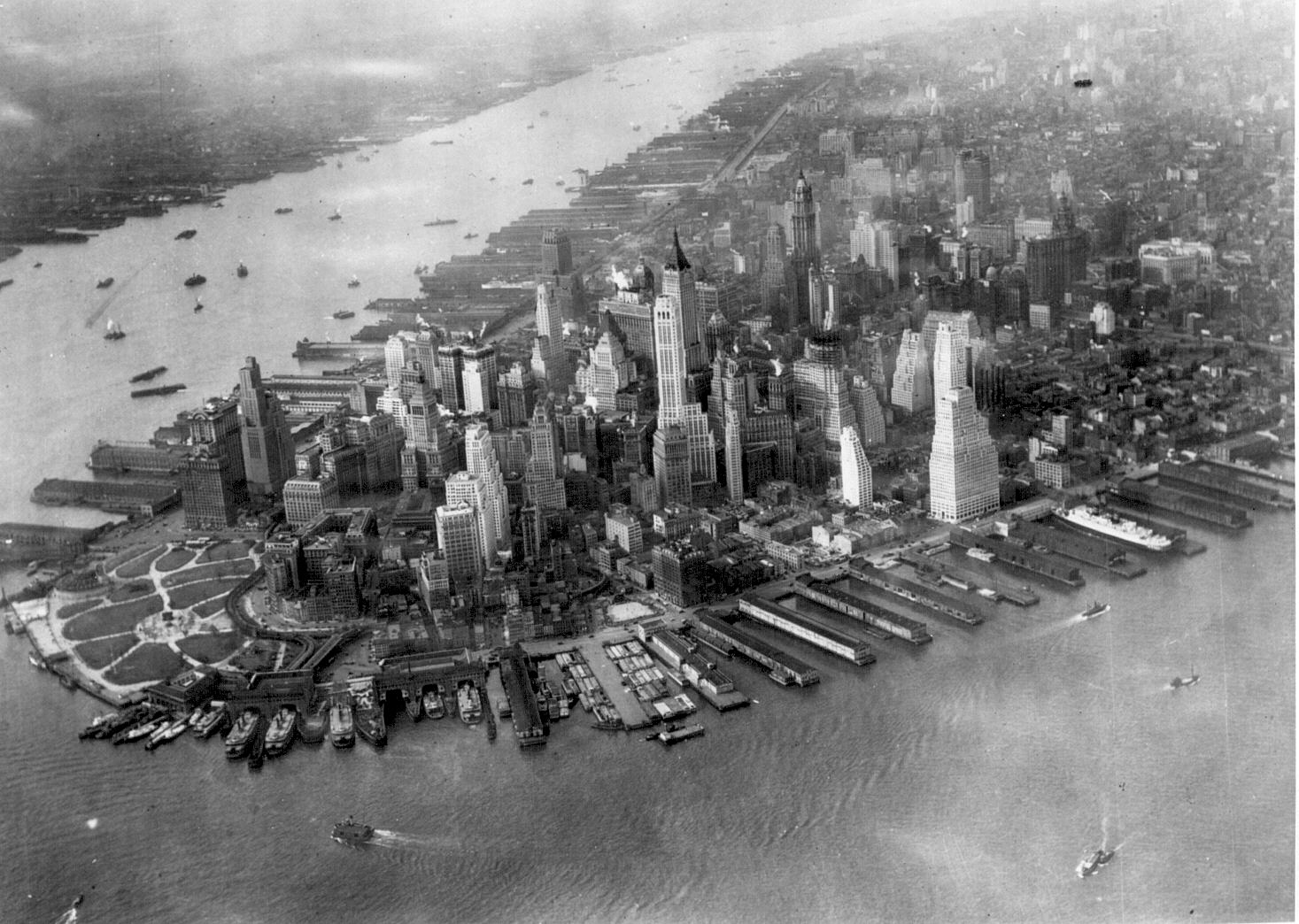
Aerial view of the tip of Lower Manhattan, 1931

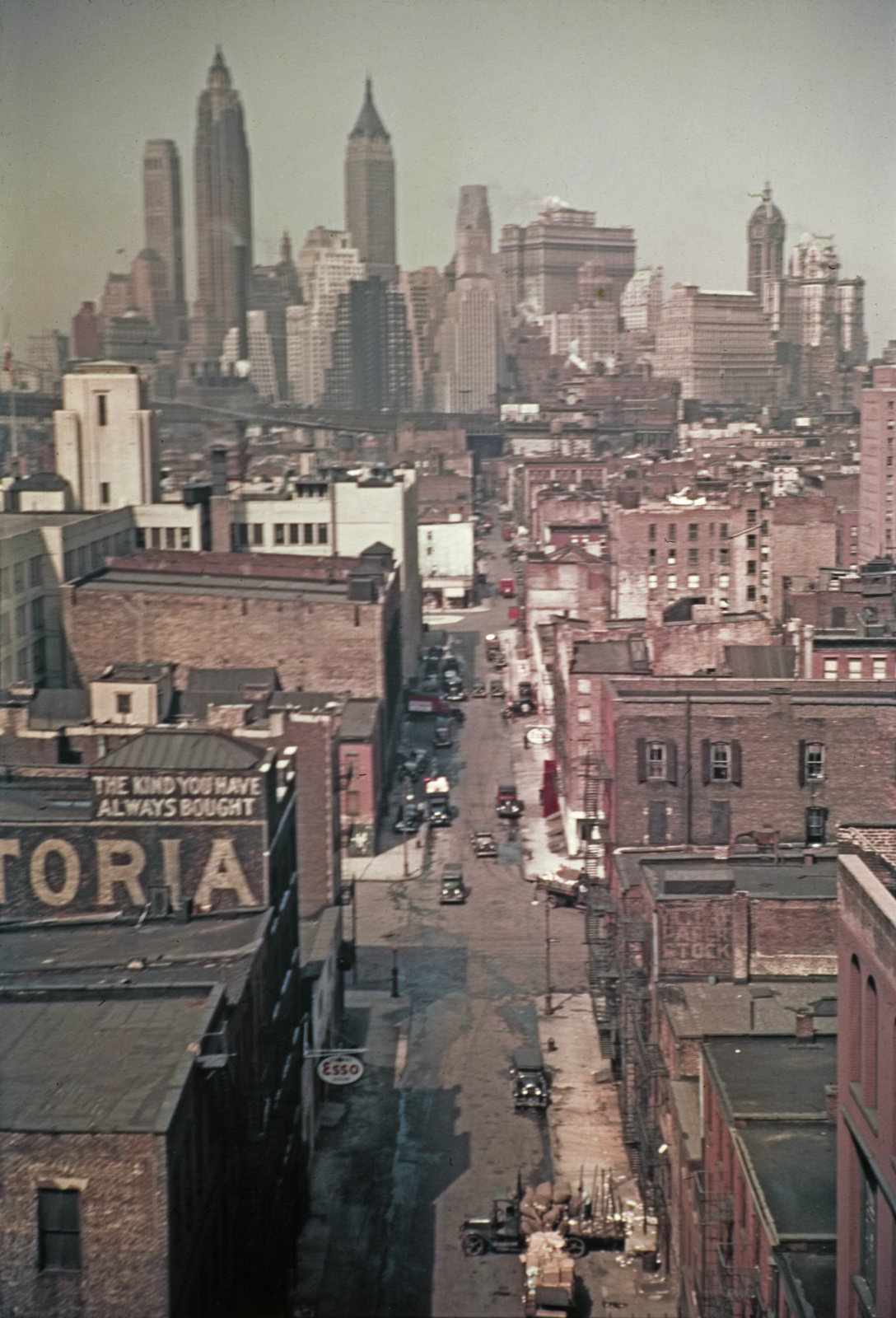
Lower East Side and Lower Manhattan skyline photographed using Agfacolor, 1938

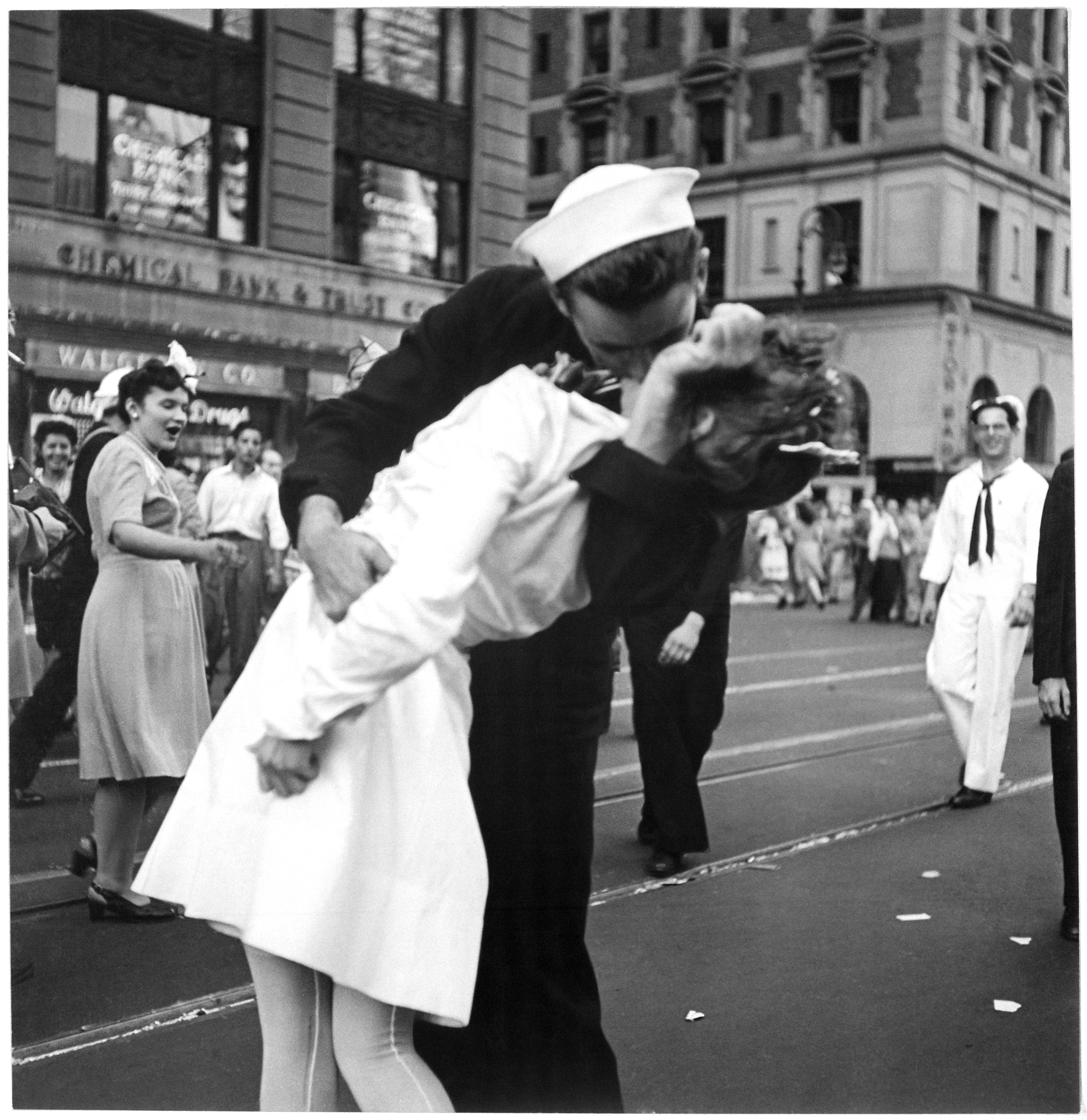
V-J Day in Times Square in Times Square, 1945

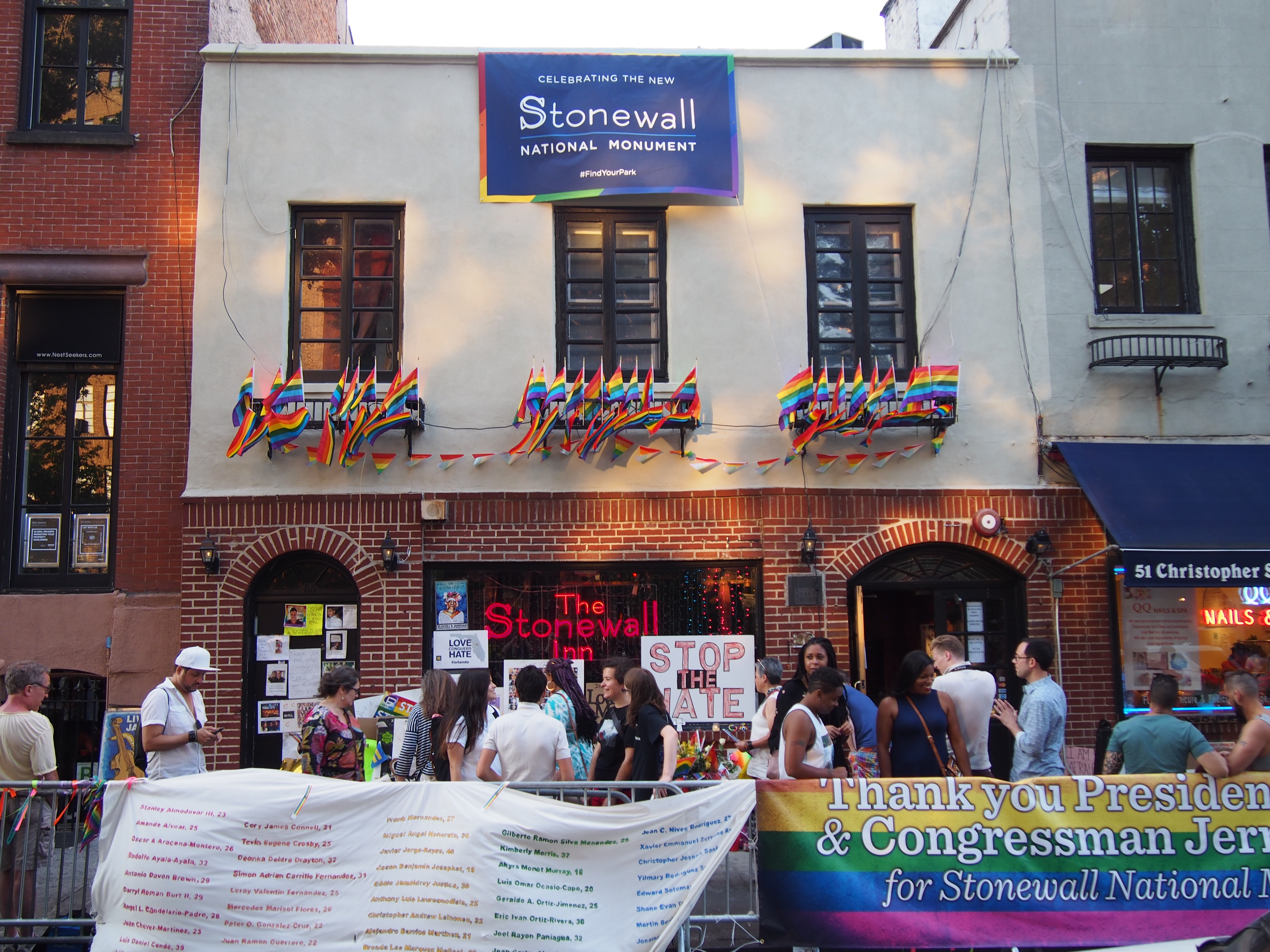
The Stonewall Inn in Greenwich Village, a designated U.S. National Historic Landmark and National Monument, as the site of the June 1969 Stonewall riots and the cradle of the modern gay rights movement

== 21st century ==
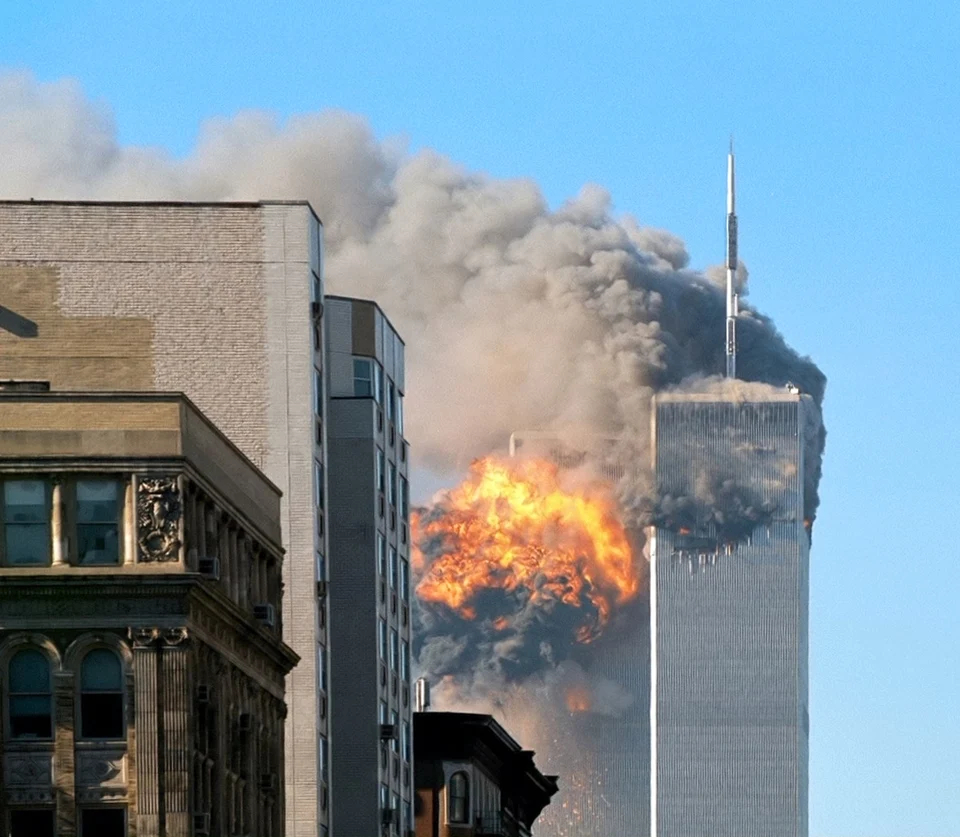
United Airlines Flight 175 hits the South Tower on September 11, 2001.

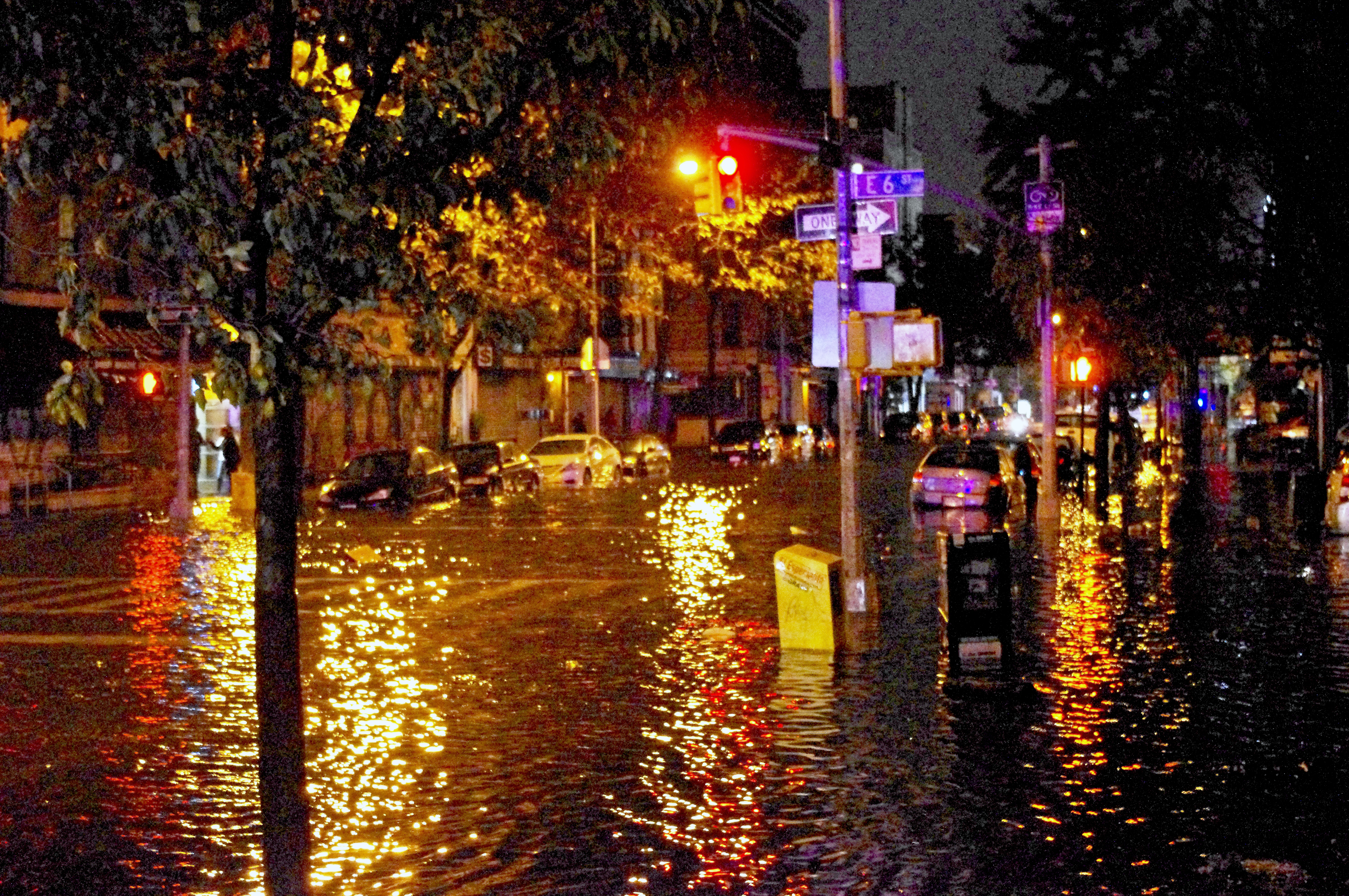
Flooding on Avenue C caused by Hurricane Sandy on October 29, 2012

On September 11, 2001, two of four hijacked planes were flown into the Twin Towers of the original World Trade Center, and the towers subsequently collapsed in the September 11 attacks launched by al-Qaeda terrorists. 7 World Trade Center collapsed due to fires and structural damage caused by heavy debris falling from the collapse of the Twin Towers. The other buildings within the World Trade Center complex were damaged beyond repair and soon after demolished. The collapse of the Twin Towers caused extensive damage to other surrounding buildings and skyscrapers in Lower Manhattan, and resulted in the deaths of 2,606 people, in addition to those on the planes. Many rescue workers and residents of the area developed several life-threatening illnesses that have led to some of their subsequent deaths.

Since 2001, most of Lower Manhattan has been restored, although there has been controversy surrounding the rebuilding. A memorial at the site was opened to the public on September 11, 2011, and the museum opened in 2014. In 2014, the new One World Trade Center, at 1,776 feet (541 m) and formerly known as the Freedom Tower, became the tallest building in the Western Hemisphere, while other skyscrapers were under construction at the site.

The Occupy Wall Street protests in Zuccotti Park in the Financial District of Lower Manhattan began on September 17, 2011, receiving global attention and spawning the Occupy movement against social and economic inequality worldwide.

On October 29 and 30, 2012, Hurricane Sandy caused extensive destruction in the borough, ravaging portions of Lower Manhattan with record-high storm surge from New York Harbor, severe flooding, and high winds, causing power outages for hundreds of thousands of city residents and leading to gasoline shortages and disruption of mass transit systems. The storm and its profound impacts have prompted the discussion of constructing seawalls and other coastal barriers around the shorelines of the borough and the metropolitan area to minimize the risk of destructive consequences from another such event in the future. Around 15 percent of the borough is considered to be in flood-risk zones.

On October 31, 2017, a terrorist took a rental pickup truck and deliberately drove down a bike path alongside the West Side Highway in Lower Manhattan, killing eight people and injuring a dozen others before crashing into a school bus.

== See also ==
- History of education in New York City
- History of New York City
- Timeline of Brooklyn
- Timeline of the Bronx
- Timeline of Queens
- Timeline of Staten Island
