= Upper Manhattan =

Northern part of Manhattan, New York City

Coordinates: 40.797°N 73.949°W

A map of Upper Manhattan, with Harlem in red

Upper Manhattan is the northern section of the New York City borough of Manhattan. Its southern boundary has been variously defined, but some of the most common usages are 96th Street, 110th Street (the northern boundary of Central Park), 125th Street, or 155th Street. The term Uptown can refer to Upper Manhattan, but is often used more generally for neighborhoods above 59th Street; in the broader definition, Uptown encompasses Upper Manhattan.

Upper Manhattan is generally taken to include the neighborhoods of Manhattan Inwood, Washington Heights (including Fort George, Sherman Creek and Hudson Heights), Harlem (including Sugar Hill, Hamilton Heights and Manhattanville), East Harlem, Morningside Heights, and Manhattan Valley (in the Upper West Side).

The George Washington Bridge connects Washington Heights in Upper Manhattan across the Hudson River to Fort Lee, New Jersey, and is the world's busiest motor vehicle bridge.

In the late 19th century, the IRT Ninth Avenue Line and other elevated railroads brought people to the previously rustic Upper Manhattan. Until the late 20th century it was less influenced by the gentrification that had taken place in other parts of New York over the previous 30 years.

== Tourist attractions ==
Like other residential areas, Upper Manhattan is not a major center of tourism in New York City, although many tourist attractions lie within it, such as Grant's Tomb, the Apollo Theater, United Palace, and The Cloisters, Sylvia's Restaurant, the Hamilton Grange, the Morris–Jumel Mansion, Minton's Playhouse, Sugar Hill, Riverside Church, the National Jazz Museum in Harlem, and the Dyckman House, along with Fort Tryon Park, most of Riverside Park, Riverbank State Park, Sakura Park, and other parks.

== Gallery ==
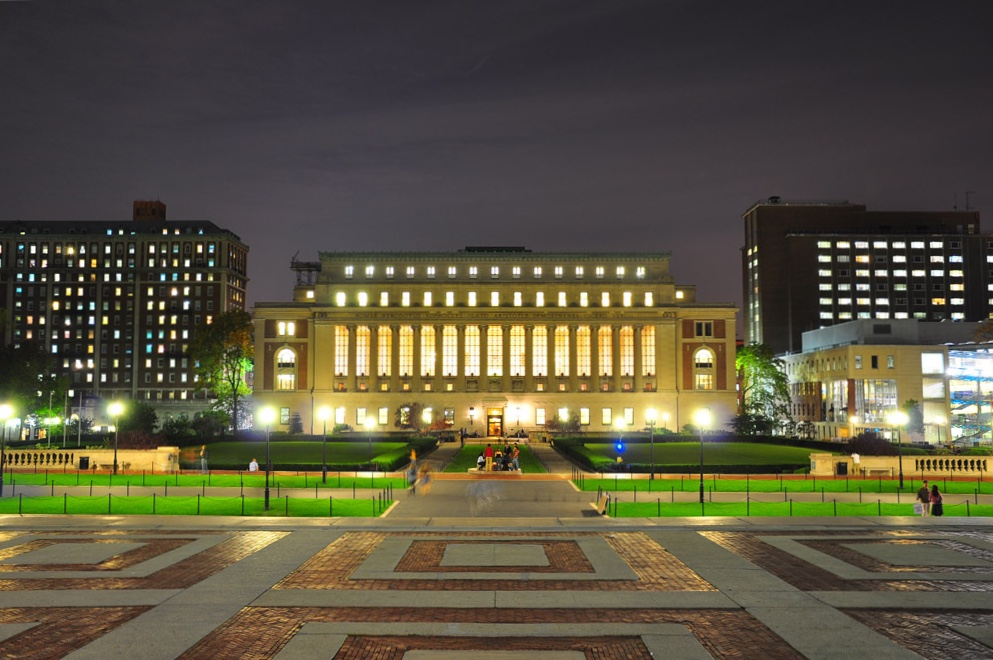
Butler Library on the campus of Columbia University in Morningside Heights

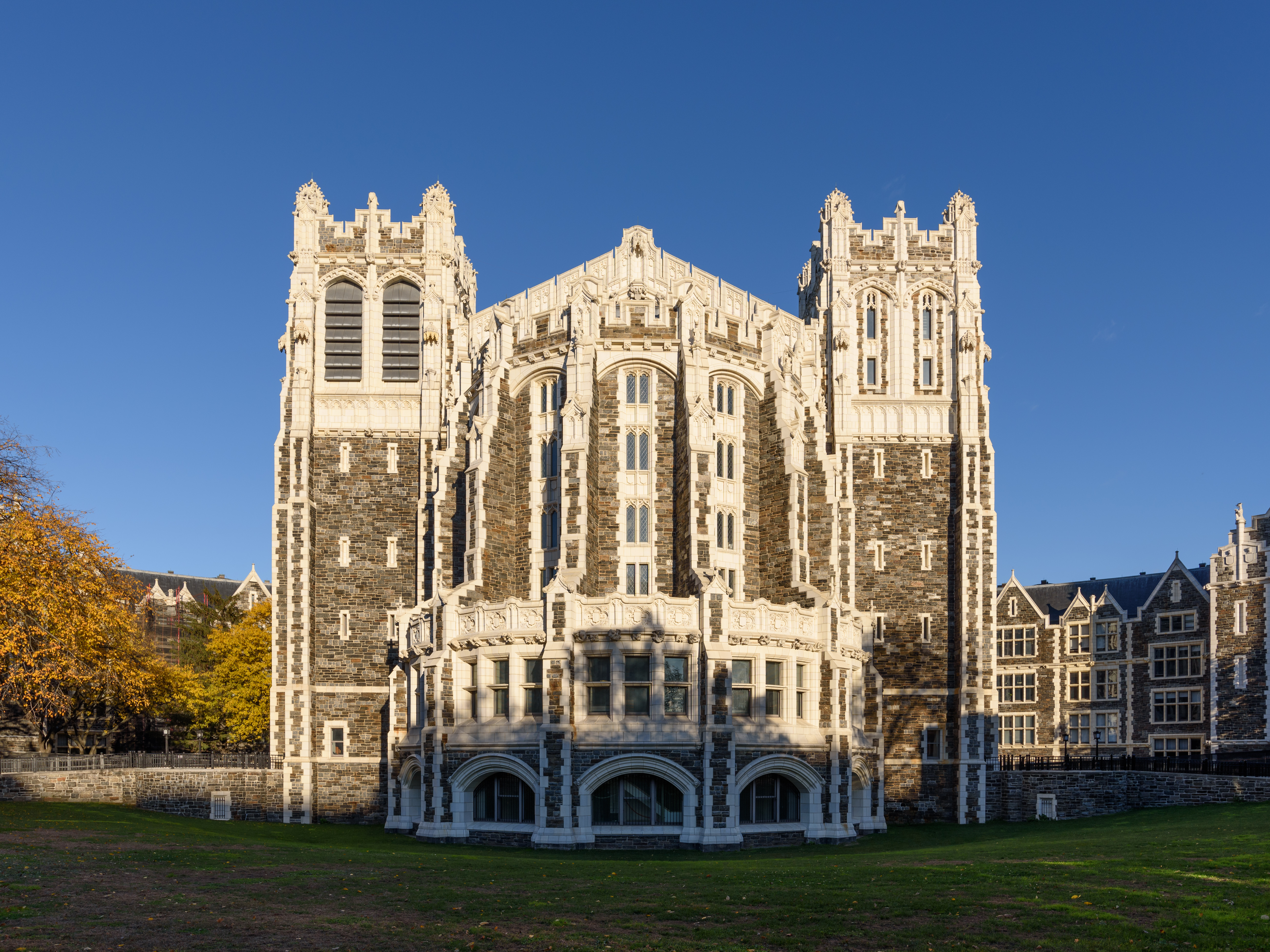
City College of New York in Hamilton Heights

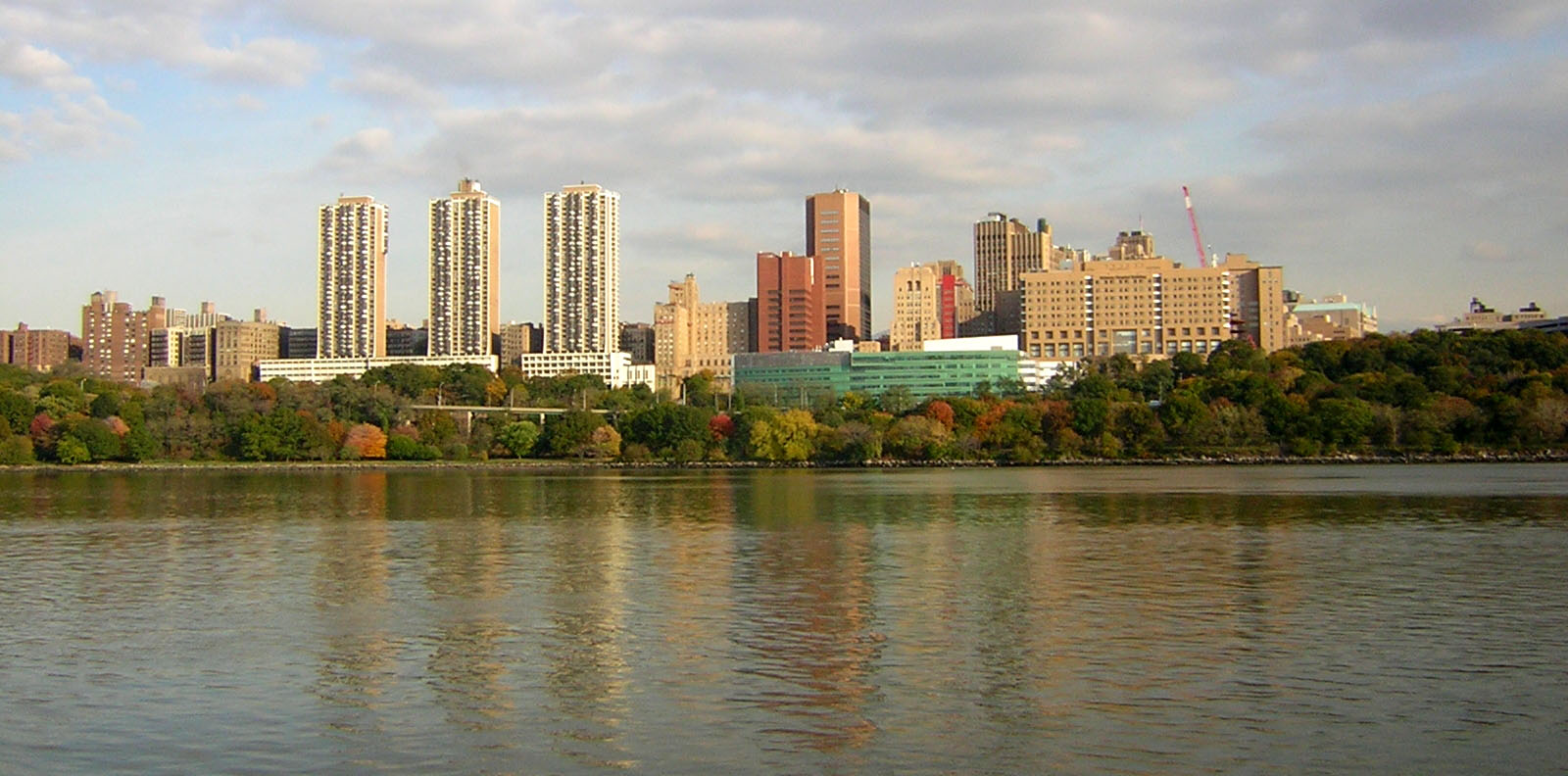
Columbia University Irving Medical Center in Washington Heights

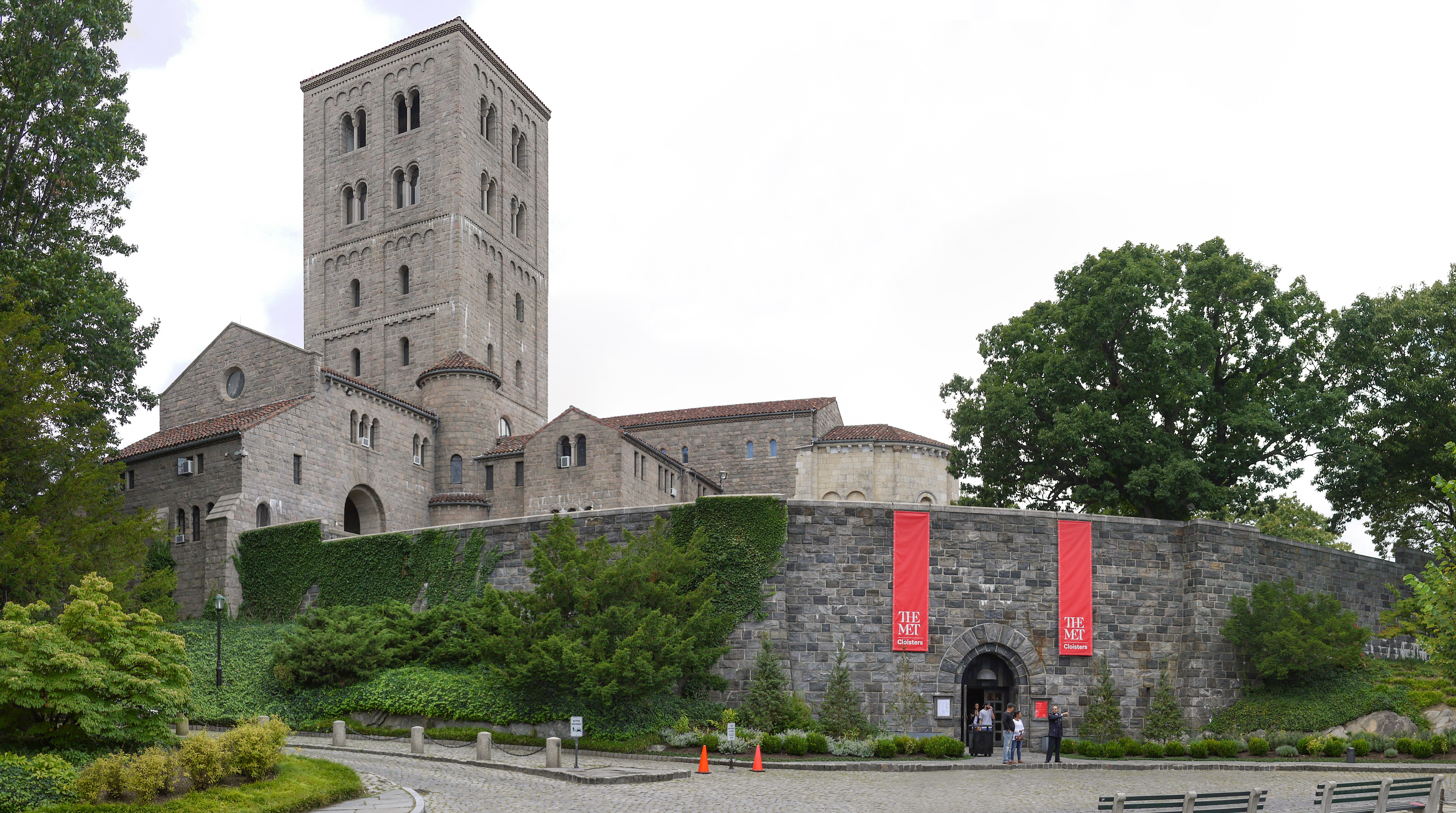
The Cloisters in Fort Tryon Park houses the medieval art collection of the Metropolitan Museum of Art.

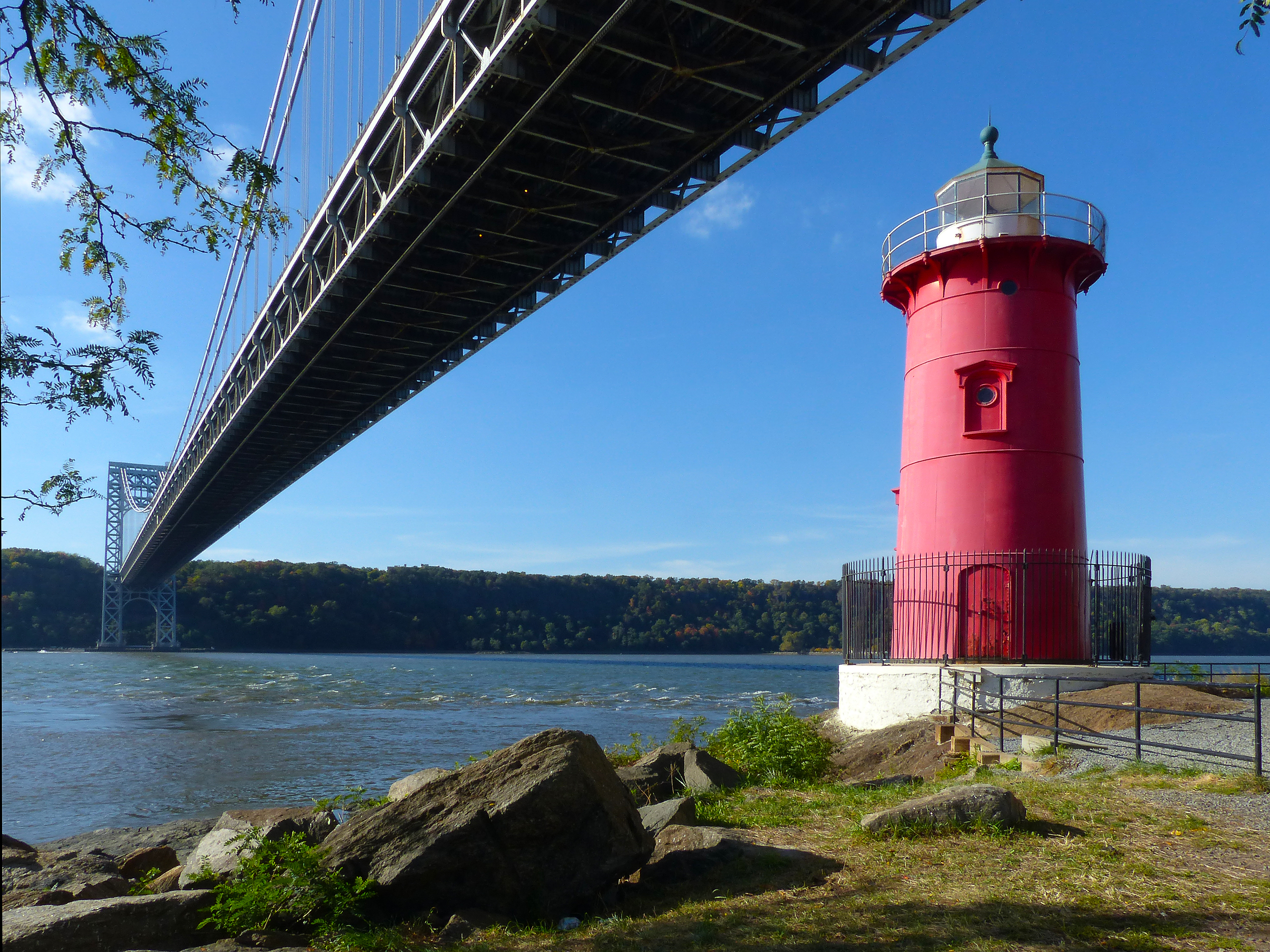
The Little Red Lighthouse under the George Washington Bridge

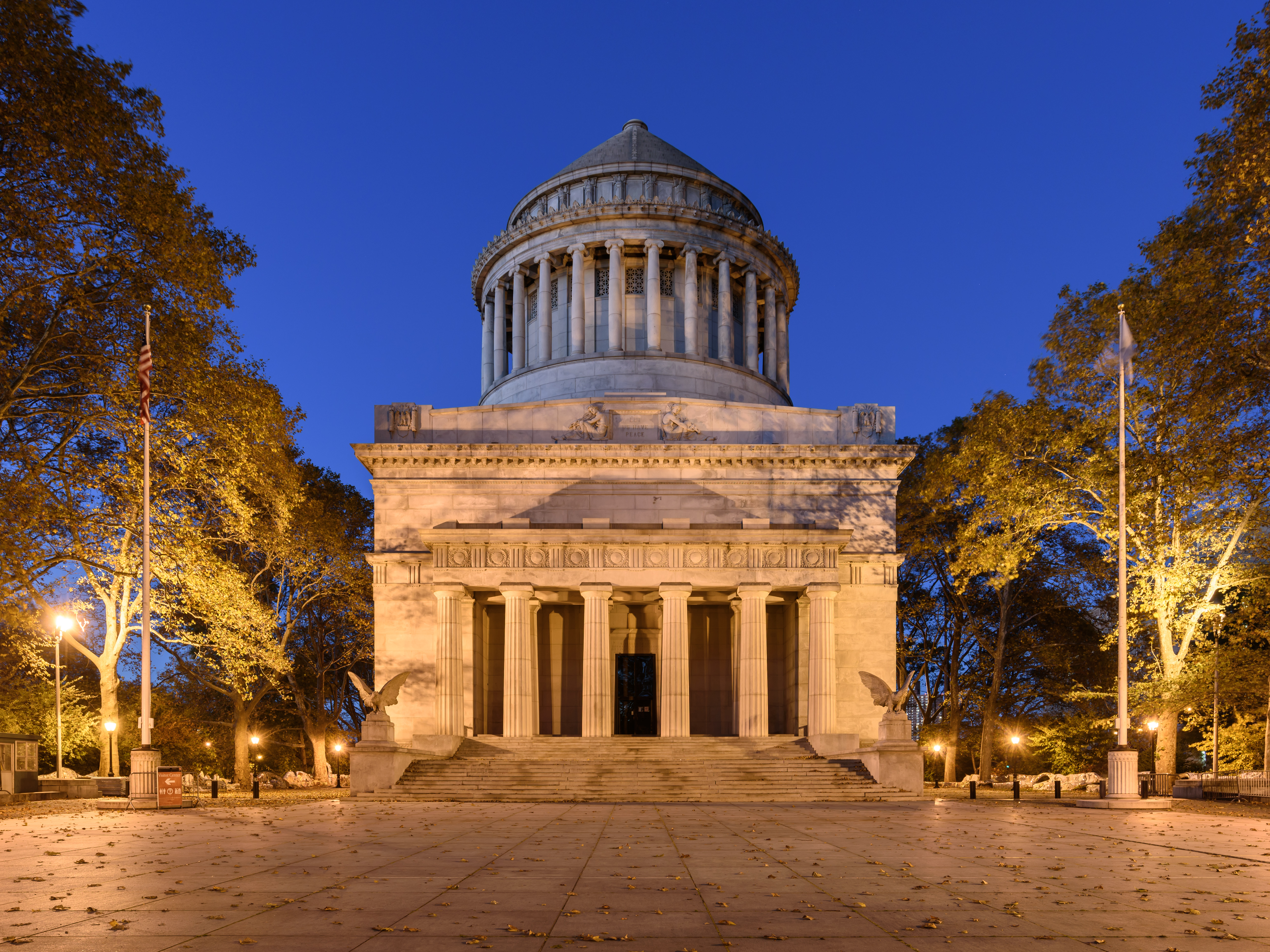
Grant's Tomb in Morningside Heights

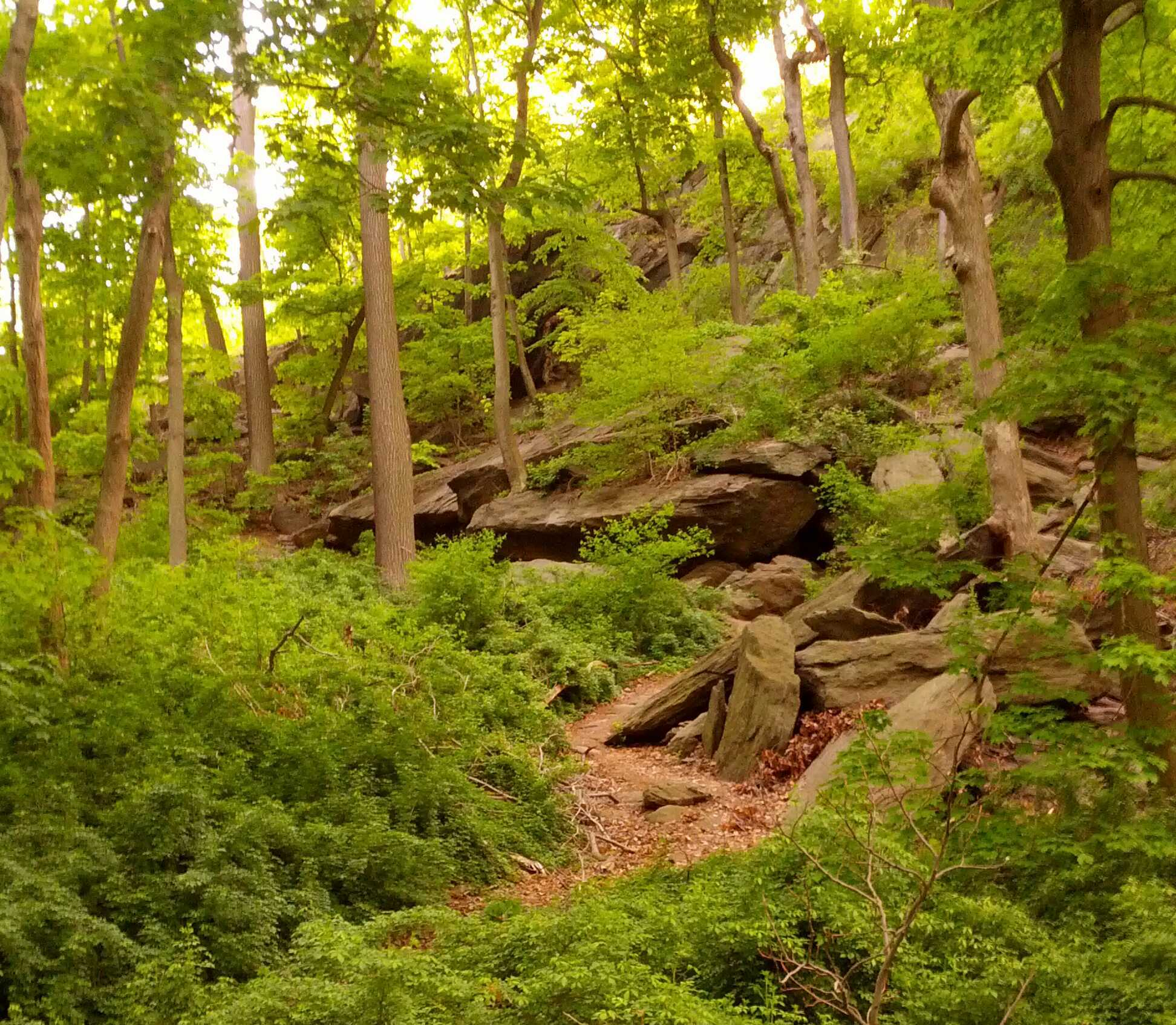
Inwood Hill Park contains the last remnant of the primeval forest which once covered Manhattan; these caves were used by native Lenape people.

== See also ==
- History of Manhattan
- History of New York City
- Lower Manhattan
- Midtown Manhattan
