= Nechtanc =

Former Lenape settlement

Coordinates: 40.715°N 73.979°W

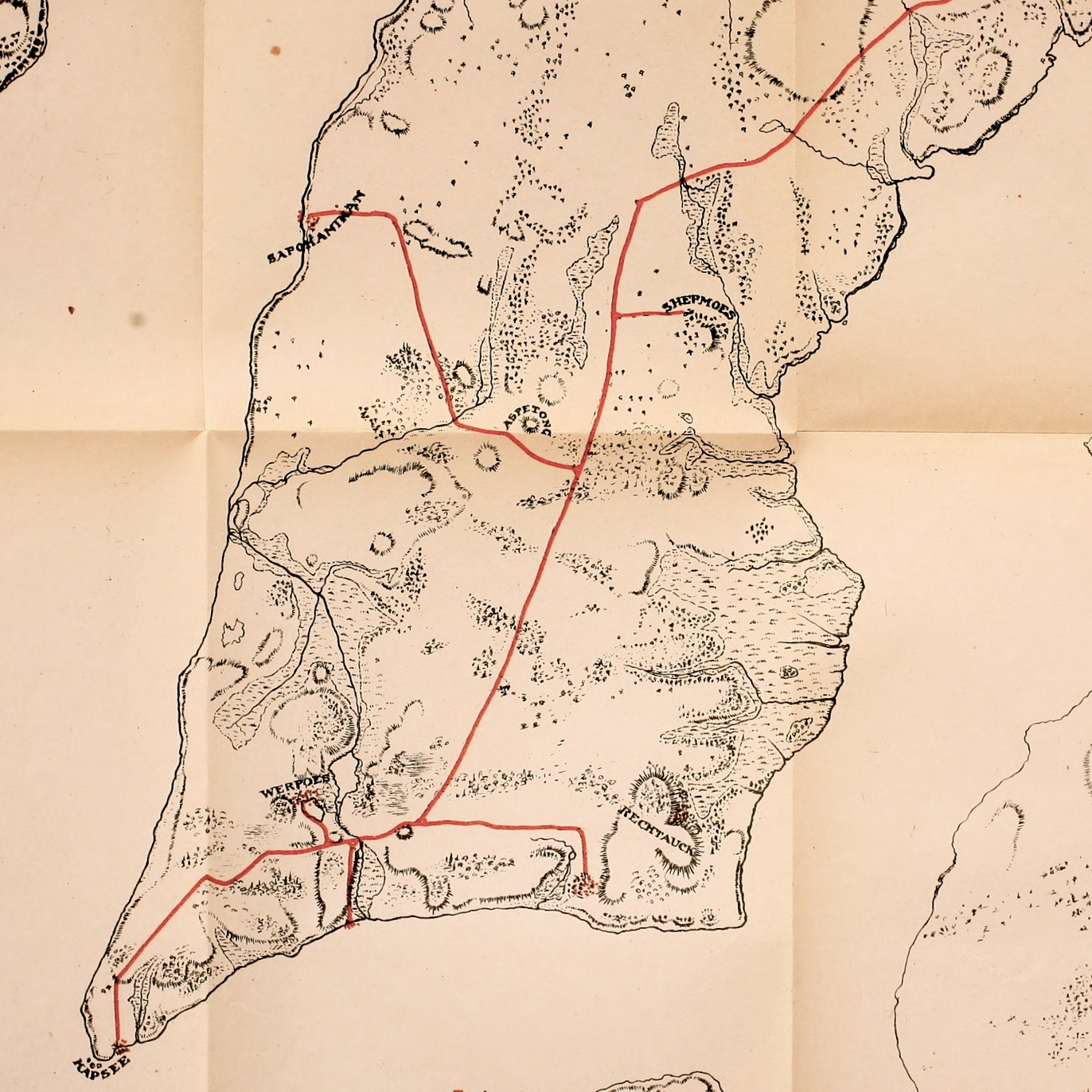
Map of Lower Manhattan from 1922 showing the location of the settlement as Rechtauk (shown in the lower right)

Nechtanc ("sandy point") was a Lenape settlement of the Canarsee located in what is now Two Bridges, Manhattan or the Lower East Side where the East River begins to turn north. In 1643, the settlement was the site of a massacre of Lenape people, mostly women and children, after the governor of New Netherland ordered the people killed as they slept. A simultaneous massacre occurred at Pavonia, just across the East River. The village is alternatively referred to in historical documents as Rechtauk.

== History ==
=== Pre-colonial ===
Nechtanc had an established path to a deep pond, now known as Collect Pond, where trade with other settlements in the area would frequently occur. The pond fed the fresh rivers of Manhattan that fed into large marshes. The people paddled on canoes, the main mode of transportation for the coastal settlement, through these marshes to reach the other side of the island as well as across the East River and beyond. Nearby Lenape settlements included Sapohanikan to the northwest and Konaande Kongh to the north. The settlement was a frequent fishing spot for the people.

=== New Netherland ===
With the establishment of Dutch settlements in the area starting in the early 17th century, the Lenape were increasingly pushed out of Manhattan. The first European who gained title to the land where Nechtanc was situated was Jacob van Corlear, who purchased the land by 1639 as approved by then governor Wouter van Twiller. The land was leased for a period of three years by Corlear to Willem Hendricksen for a plantation. The settlement location existed adjacent to the plantation for a few years. In 1639 and 1640, the name of the settlement was recorded in Dutch colonial records as both Nechtanc and Nechttanck.

==== Nechtanc massacre ====
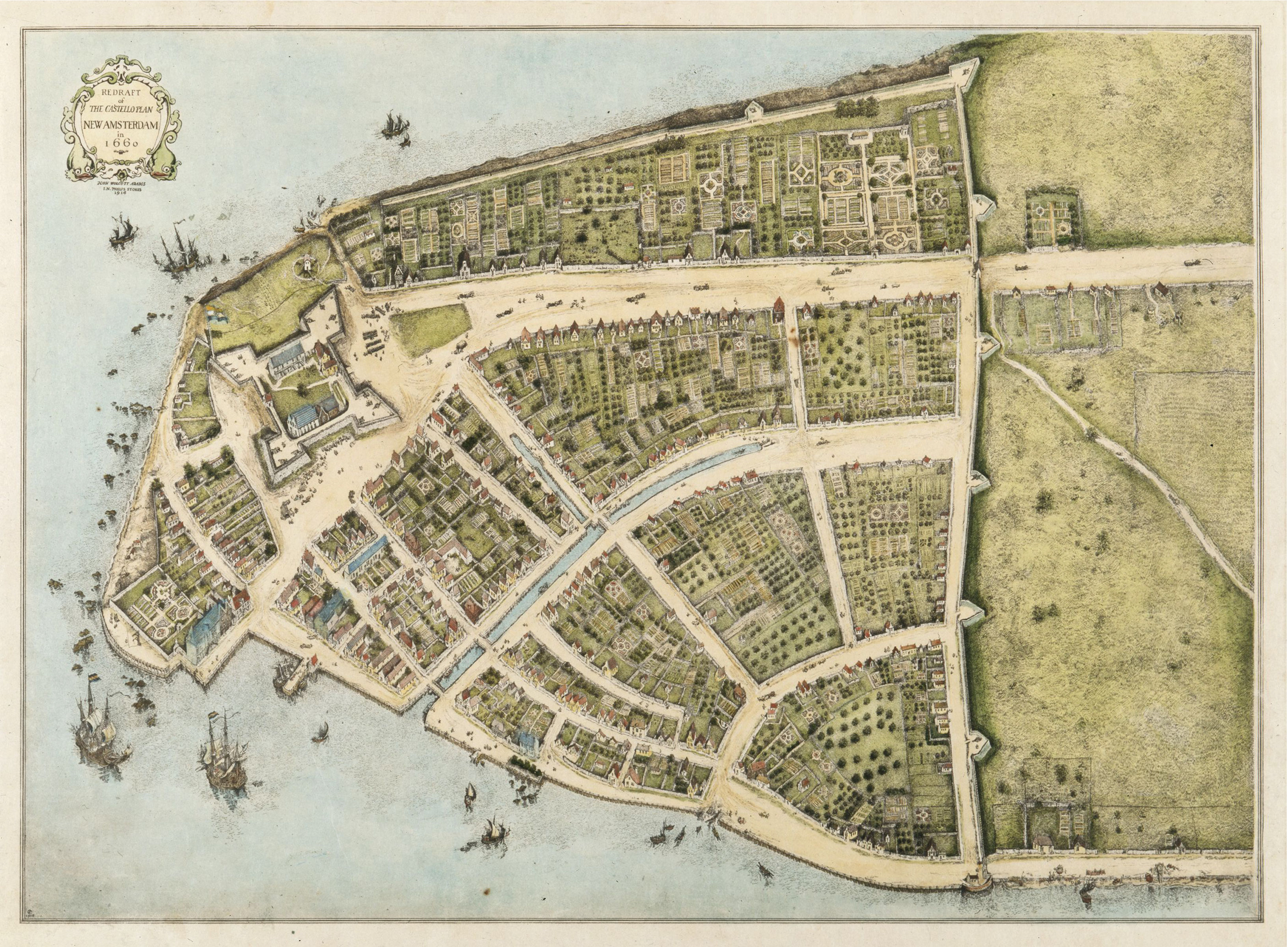
A map of New Amsterdam (redrawn from a 1660 map) showing the wall that was solidified after the Nechtanc massacre and the "Negro" farms located outside the wall as a "buffer zone" for the Dutch colonists.

On the night of February 25, 1643, Nechtanc was the site one of the earliest massacres of Native Americans by European colonists in North America. A large group of Lenape refugees from New Jersey took refuge at Nechtanc and Pavonia from the Mohicans, who they were in conflict with to the north. At around midnight, the governor William Kieft ordered the Lenape slaughtered as they slept. About 40 people were massacred at Nechtanc and 80 at Pavonia, many of whom were women and children. Some residents of New Amsterdam had opposed Kieft's decision to initiate the massacre.

After this massacre, the Dutch solidified a barrier between New Amsterdam and Lenape territory as a "buffer zone" in case of retribution, which soon broke out as Kieft's War. This "buffer" area was given to freed slaves, as they were deemed to be the most disposable part of the colonial population. Between the European settlement and the area referred to by the Dutch as "the negroes' farms" stood a 12-foot-high wall made of sharpened oak posts that ran for some 2,340 feet. The site of this street along the wall would later become known as Wall Street.

This massacre unified the Lenape of the lower Hudson River area to unify in an unprecedented manner in their history against the Dutch. As noted by David Pietersz de Vries, "They burned all the houses, farms, barns, grain, haystacks, and destroyed everything they could get hold of. So there was an open destructive war began." Dutch fears over a Lenape assault continued for years after the massacre, being a reason for Kieft's replacement as governor and his successor Peter Stuyvesant replacing this barrier with a more reinforced wall.
