= Sapohanikan =

Former Lenape settlement

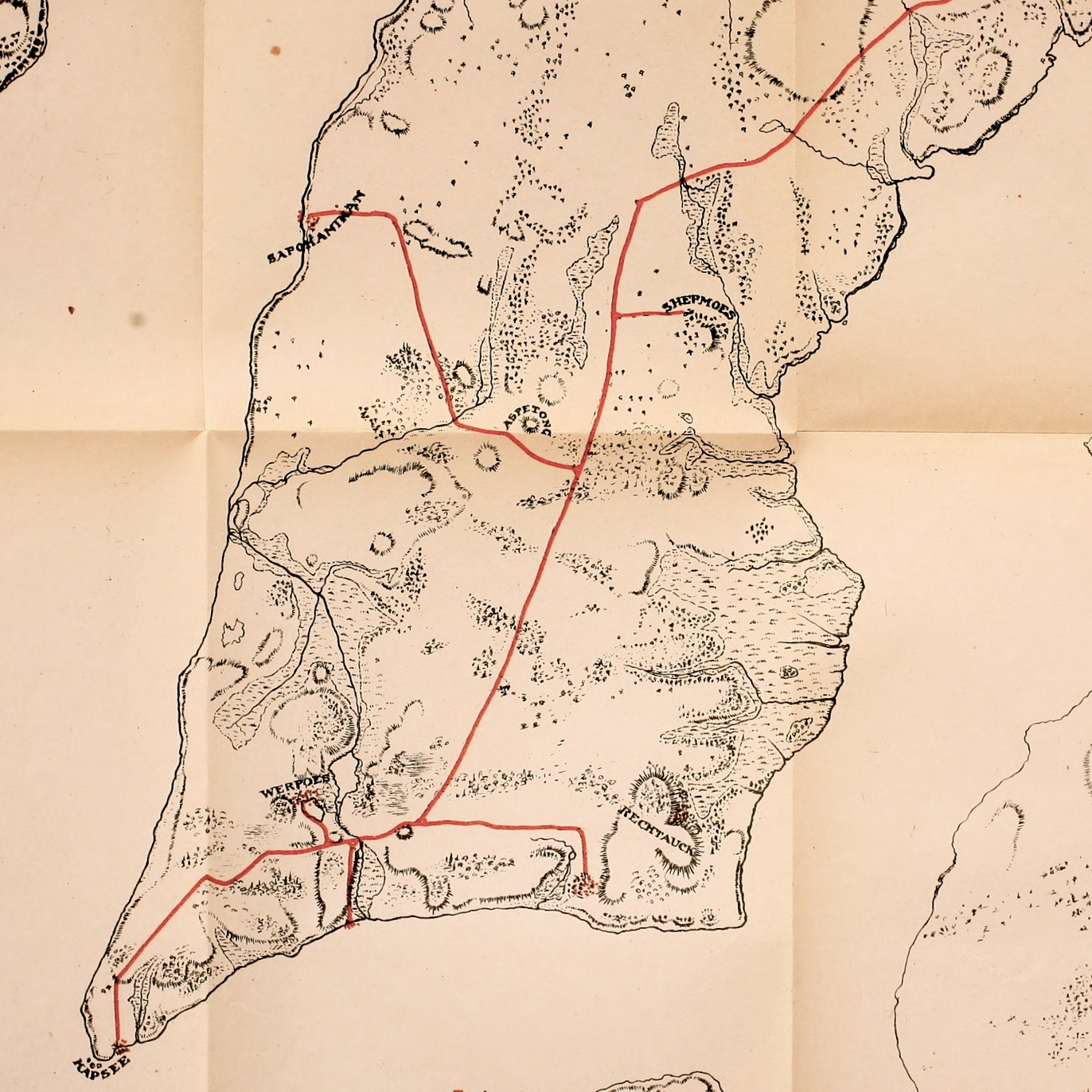
Map of Lower Manhattan from 1922 showing the location of Sapohanikan (shown in the upper left)

Sapohanikan was a Lenape settlement of the Canarsee now located in close proximity to where Gansevoort Street meets Washington Street near the Hudson River in Manhattan. The people of the settlement were violently displaced under Dutch Governor Wouter van Twiller in the 1630s, who operated a tobacco plantation for the Dutch West India Company.

In the colony of New Netherland, the area that is now Greenwich Village was commonly referred to as Sapokanikan up until the beginnings of British rule. The area of the settlement was referred to in historical records as Sapohanikan in 1639, as Sappokanican in 1640, and as Sapokanikan and Saponickan in 1641.

== Etymology ==
The settlement name may have been derived from the Lenape language word Awasopoakanichan "over against the pipe-making place," a remnant of the name Hopoakanhaking, "at the tobacco-pipe land." The name of Hoboken, New Jersey, which lies shore of the Hudson River opposite Sapohanikan, is derived from "Hopoghan Hackingh", the "land of the tobacco pipe", most likely to refer to the soapstone collected there to carve tobacco pipes.

== History ==
=== Pre-colonial ===
Sapohanikan was one of at least eighty Lenape habitation sites that have since been identified by archaeologists in the area now occupied by the five boroughs of New York City. In this area also resided over two dozen planting fields as well as the pathways that interconnected these settlements. Nearby villages included Nechtanc to the southeast at the mouth of the East River and Konaande Kongh to the northwest.

The settlement was a cultivated fishing and planting site that could be found along an extensive series of paths leading west toward the banks of the Hudson River. The name derived from the Lenape word for tobacco, which was likely cultivated there, given that cultivated areas surrounded the settlement's immediate vicinity. Sapohanikan may have been seasonal and was possibly important for oyster harvesting.

=== Destruction ===
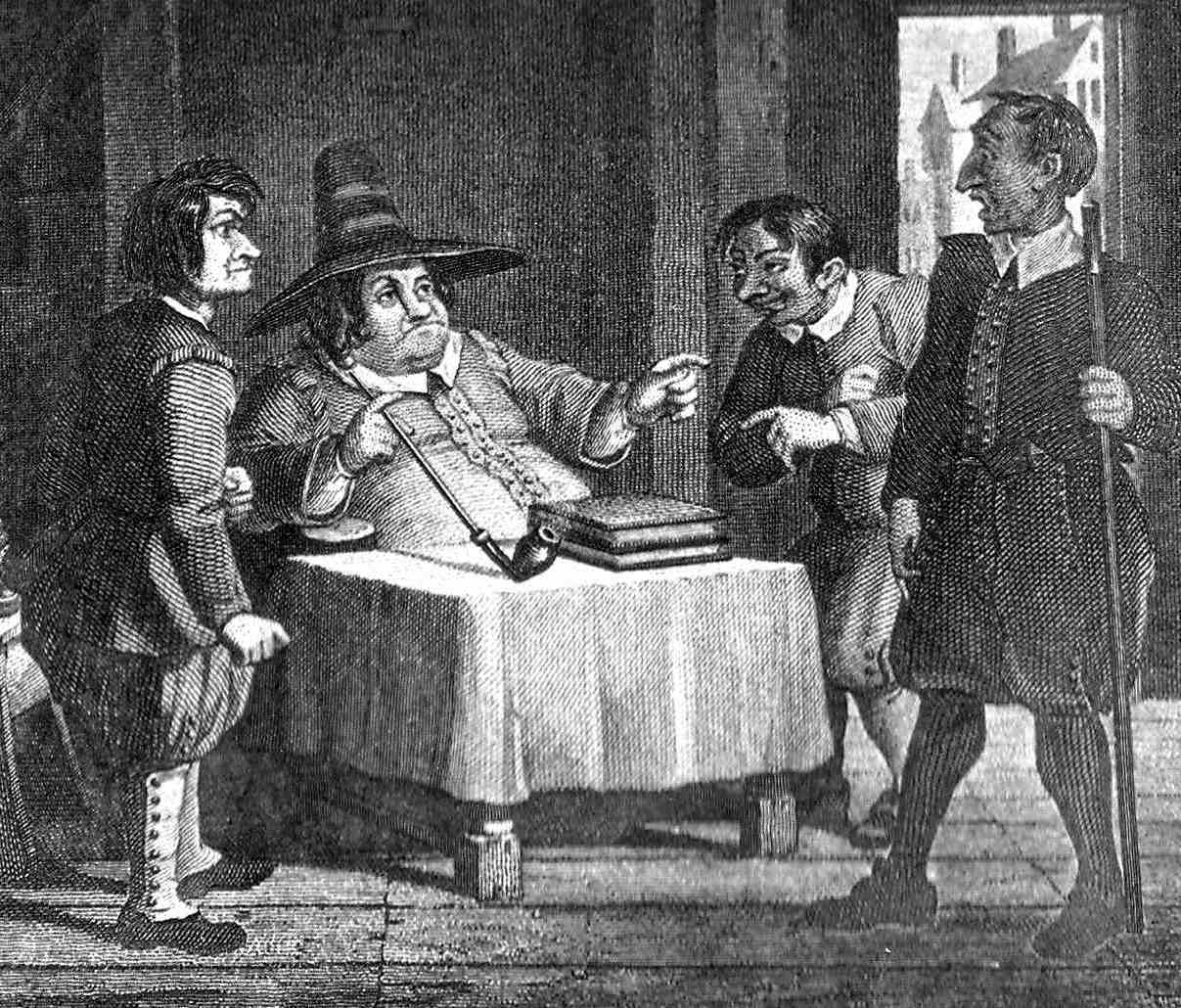
The village people were violently pushed out of the area by Dutch Governor of New Netherland Wouter van Twiller.

In the early 1630s, Sapohanikan became increasingly encroached upon by the Dutch settlement of Noortwyck ("north village").

In 1633, the outskirts of Sapohanikan were transformed into a tobacco plantation by New Netherland Governor Wouter van Twiller, who titled it the Bossen Bouwerie ("the farm in the woods"). Van Twiller was known as an "insatiable grabber of land from the Indians" who drove the residents of Sapohanikan out of the area with "intermittent, bloody warfare."

Van Twiller's plantation soon expanded to 300 acres, extending from Minetta Waters (now buried under Manhattan) to the Hudson River. The plantation was, in name, for the Dutch West India Company, but most of the profits were held by Van Twiller.

Van Twiller's Bossen Bouwerie grew its operations in the 1640s. The purchase and sale of land at this plantation between Dutch landowners being recorded several times in official records as the "plantation at Sapokanikan." Nearby Dutch farms were established in the area, neighboring the Bossen Bouwerie, such as the Farm of Coseyn in 1647, which was recorded as being situated along Sapokanikan wagon road.

In the 1670s, Noortwyck was officially renamed Greenwijk ("Pine District") after Yellis Mandeville purchased land in the area. In Mandeville's will, the region was recorded as Greenwich Village in 1696. The usage of Sapokanikan to refer to the area ceased with the growth of Greenwich under British rule. The fertile area around what had been Sapohanikan soon became the site of large estates.

=== Memorialization attempt ===
In 2001, there was a proposal to the Hudson River Park Trust to name a park at 14th street Sapohanikan. No formal recognition of the area as Sapohanikan Park was given. As of 2022, this park is referred to as the 14th Street Park on the Hudson River Park website.

The artist Beatriz Cortez is the creator of Sapohanikan Market, a monument at Gansevoort Market.

== Popular culture ==
Joanna Newsom's album Divers (2015) features the song "Sapokanikan," which was the lead single from the album. The song speaks to the changing landscape of Manhattan and how this relates to memory over time. The song's music video on YouTube has reached over 4 million views.
