= Konaande Kongh =

Former Lenape settlement

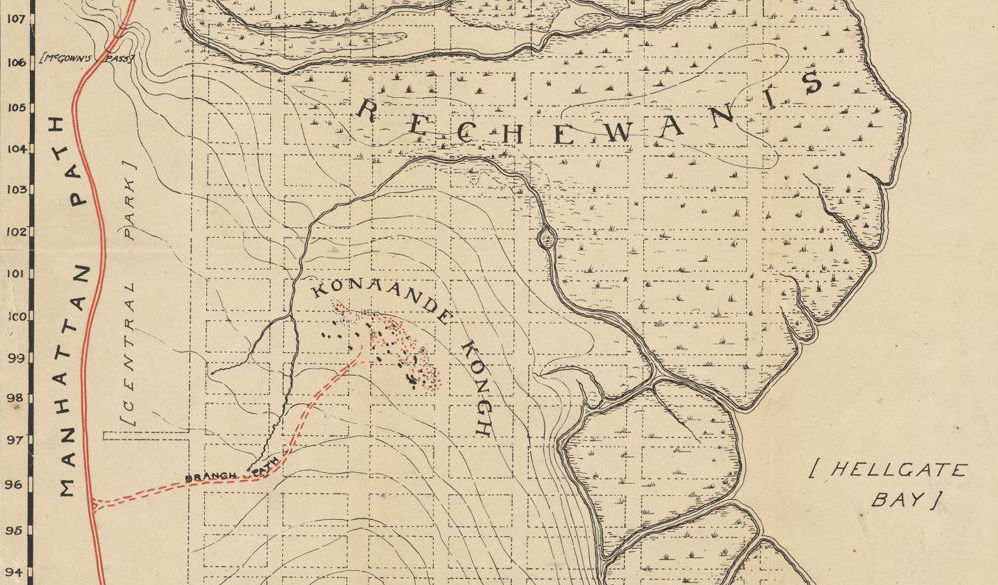
Konaande Kongh shown on a historical map of the Yorkville and East Harlem area

Konaande Kongh was a Lenape settlement of the Reckgawawanc in what is now Manhattan, New York City. It was located near what is now 98th Street and Park Avenue in East Harlem near Carnegie Hill. The settlement rested on what was once high ground, connected to the main path of Manhattan island by a branch that left the main path near 95th Street and crossed Fifth Avenue near 96th Street.

The settlement was occupied until 1669, when it was transferred to the expanding Dutch colony of New Netherland. It has been referred to as both a major settlement, village and a campsite.

== Etymology ==
The name of the settlement has been interpreted as meaning in the Lenape language, "the hill near which they fish with nets," referring to what was the popular fishing area of what is now Hell Gate.

== History ==
=== Encroachment ===
The village was a popular settlement of the Lenape for nearby hunting and fishing. The chief of the area by the mid-1600s was Rechewack. The people of the area were referred to in historical documents as Reckgawawanc, and faced attacks from the north of their territory by the Mohawk. However, although they were at war with Mohawk, historian James Riker noted "war [was] only on their persons or goods, but not on their lands, so that their title [to land] still held."

At the same time, Dutch settlements of New Netherland were moving northward from the southern areas of Manhattan island in the mid-1600s. The Dutch increasingly sought title to lands that included Konaande Kongh. Other nearby Lenape settlements to the south had already been abandoned, such as Sapohanikan in the 1630s and Nechtanc, being the site of a massacre in 1643. The Dutch had also gained title to nearby land in northern Manhattan in 1647.

=== Transfer of title ===
In 1669, the land on which the settlement rested was transferred to Jean Mousnier de la Montagne, a political leader in the expanding Dutch colony that now included the area that is now Central Park, extending from Hell Gate to the Harlem River, by Rechewack, who had held onto it until then amid surrounding pressures. The settlement was mentioned in the transfer of title as a locale near "the Point named Rechwanis."

In 1675, the Dutch ordered the Lenape "to remove within a fortnight to their usual winter quarters within Hellgate upon this island [Manhattan]," indicating that nearby areas were still being frequented by the people, possibly as hunting grounds.
