= Middle Spring Presbyterian Church =

Coordinates: 40.0818°N 77.5405°W

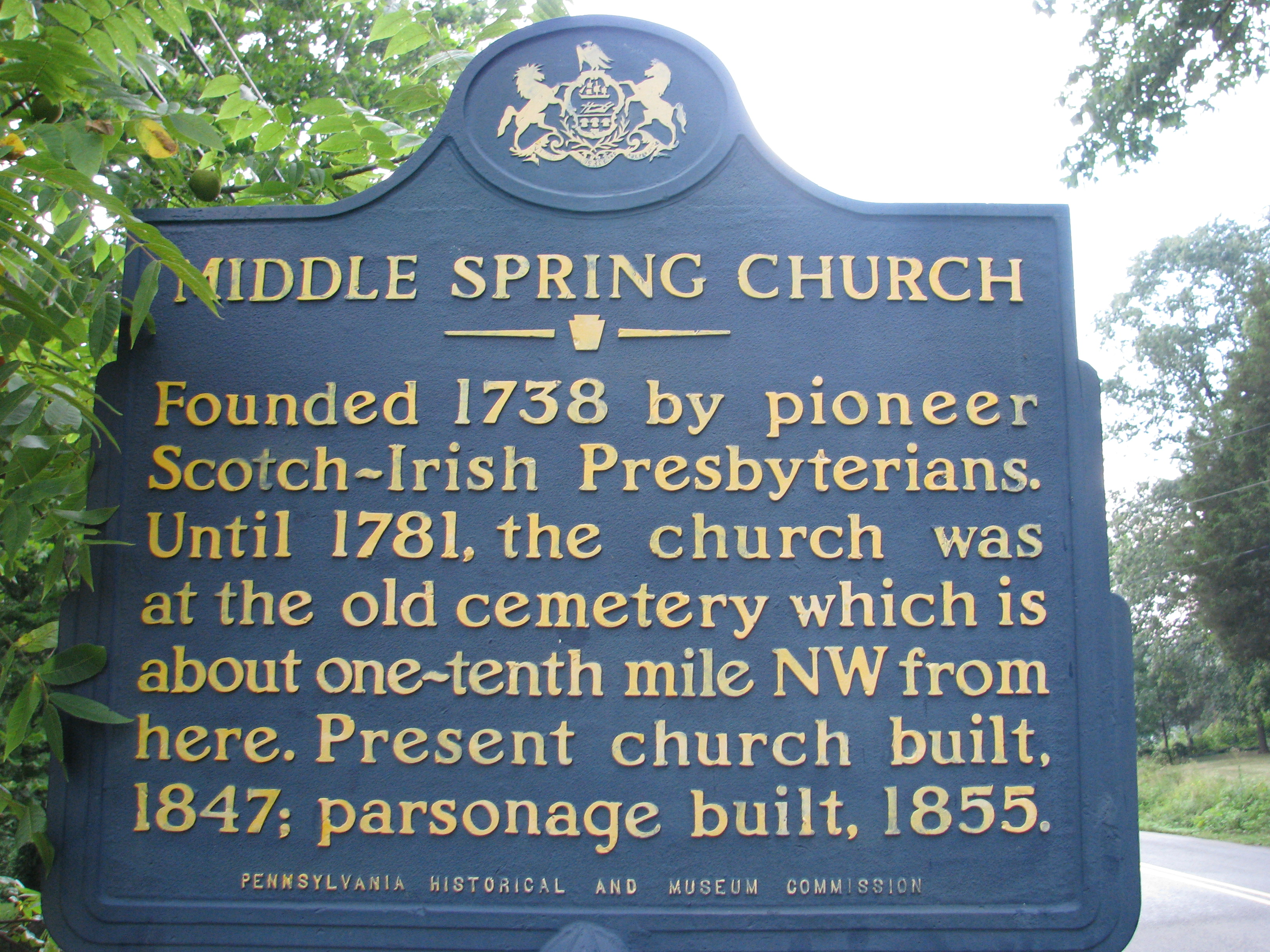
Plaque at Middle Spring Pennsylvania Presbyterian Church

The Middle Spring Presbyterian Church was built in the Province of Pennsylvania in 1738 by early Scotch Irish settlers. It has been mentioned frequently in the histories of the early days of Cumberland County, Pennsylvania and of the Commonwealth of Pennsylvania, in general.

Located in the small community of Middle Spring, Pennsylvania, on present-day Pennsylvania State Route 4001 (old Pennsylvania 696), it is situated two and six-tenths miles north of Shippensburg, Pennsylvania.

== Scotch-Irish Settlers ==
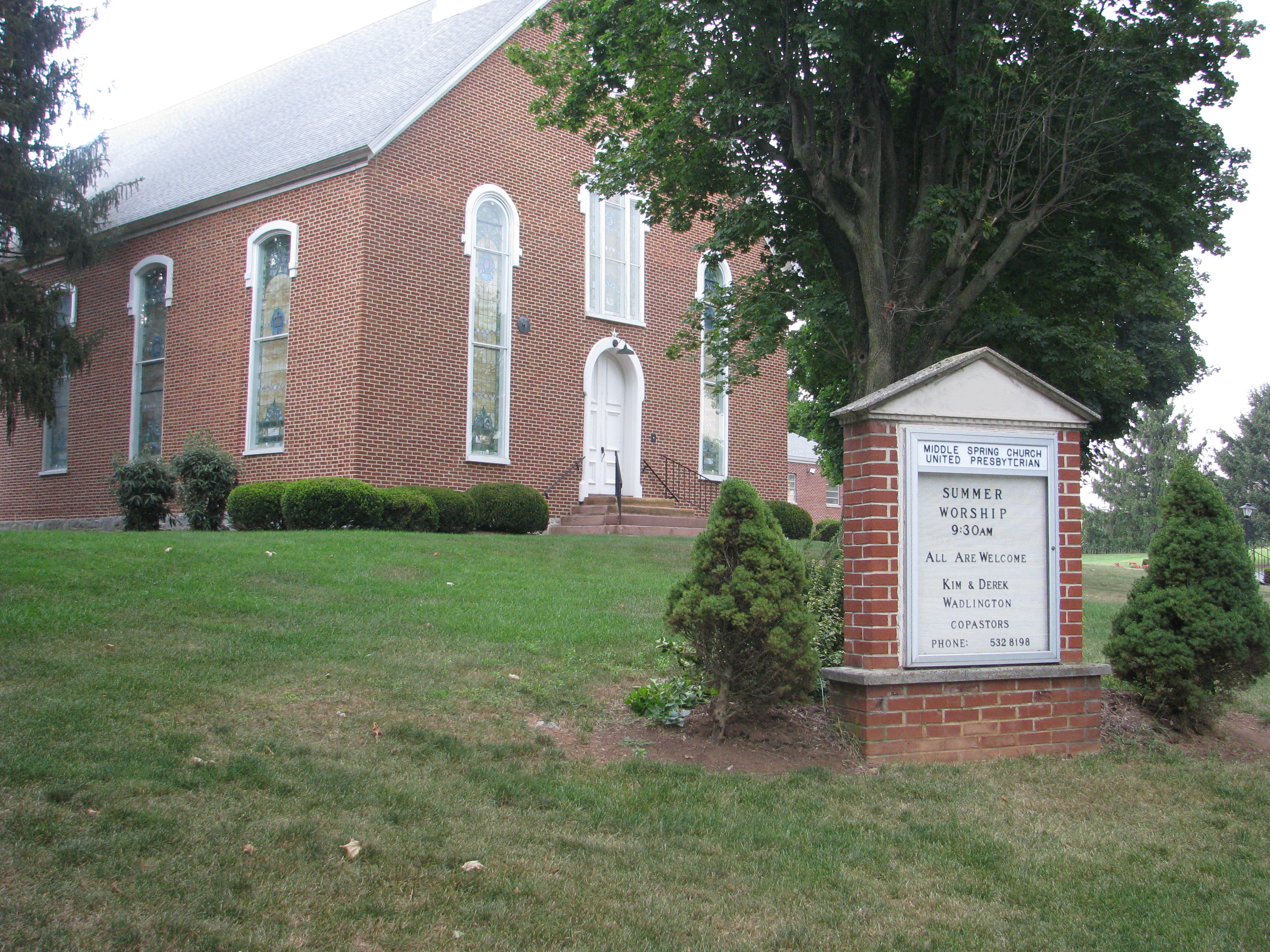
Rebuilt Middle Spring Church

Sometime around 1730, a group of Scotch Irish immigrants settled in the area of Pennsylvania that would later become Cumberland County. The Scotch Irish were among the earliest of the settlers who chose to make their homes in this frontier region of Colonial America. According to historian Wayland F. Dunaway:

The Cumberland Valley was dotted with Scotch-Irish settlements throughout its entire area, a district which had become almost exclusively the possession of this racial group, with whom were mingled small numbers of English and German settlers constituting perhaps ten percent of the population. It was well adapted to farming, and the Scotch-Irish, in this early period, were mostly farmers, but later they developed a marked aptitude for trade and the professions. As pioneers, they advanced onto land that had not previously been colonized by Europeans. On the frontier, they participated in the Indian wars, and experienced the hardships of pioneer life as was typical of frontiersmen in provincial Pennsylvania. They pushed further and further into the interior of the country.

== Founding of the Church ==
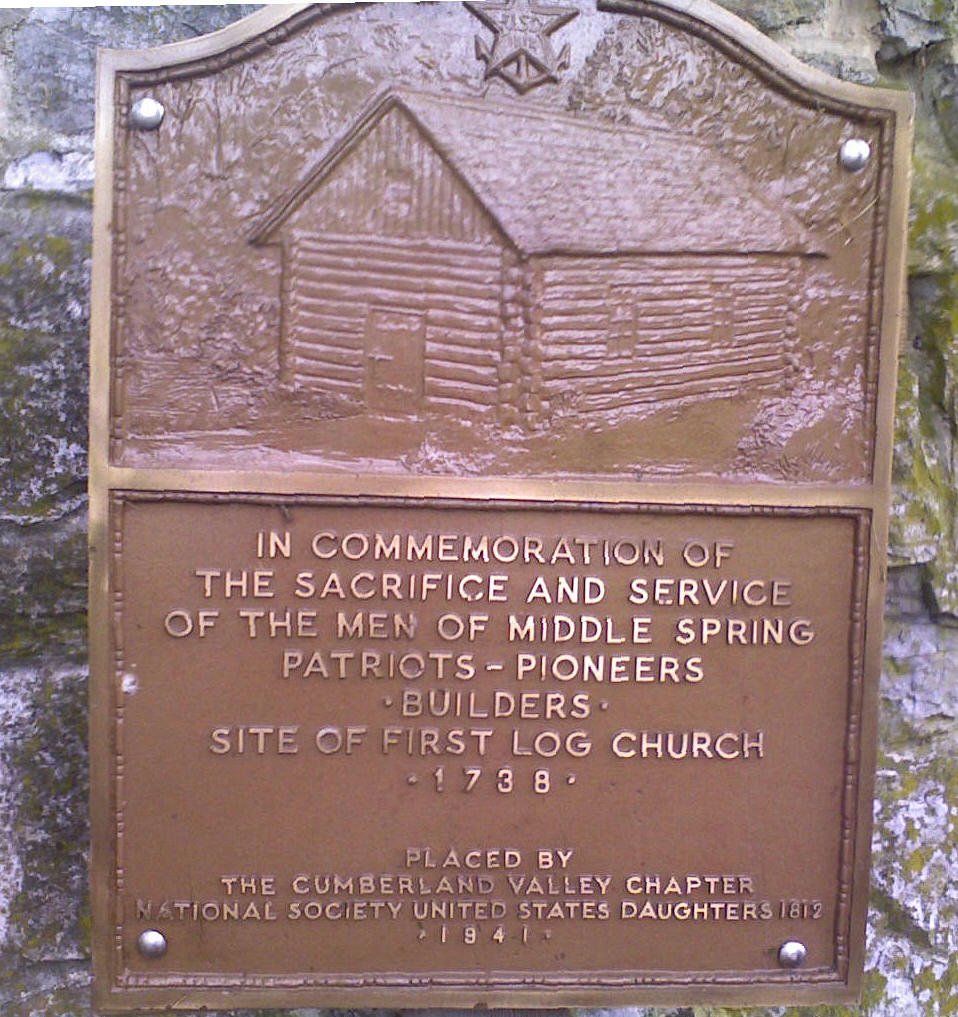
Plaque to First Log Church

Presbyterian preaching began on this site in the open air as early as 1736. Two years later, Presbyterian Church officials erected a new building here, close to the bank of the small Middle Spring creek that ran through the area, a common practice of Scotch-Irish settlers in the Cumberland Valley that enabled settlers to live and work near available, abundant sources of water. The first building was a log church, which became not only a house of worship but a gathering place for the earliest immigrants. They called the church site "Middle Spring", because it was located midway between two other water sources in the area, the Big Spring and the Rocky Spring. The church was thirty-five feet square. It had slab benches, a dirt floor and was unheated. The pulpit was high and was set against the wall with the precentor's desk positioned just below, in the front.

In those days, the Middle Spring area was very much a part of a rugged frontier; encounters with Indigenous peoples were common, some of which were violent.

== Attending the Frontier Church ==
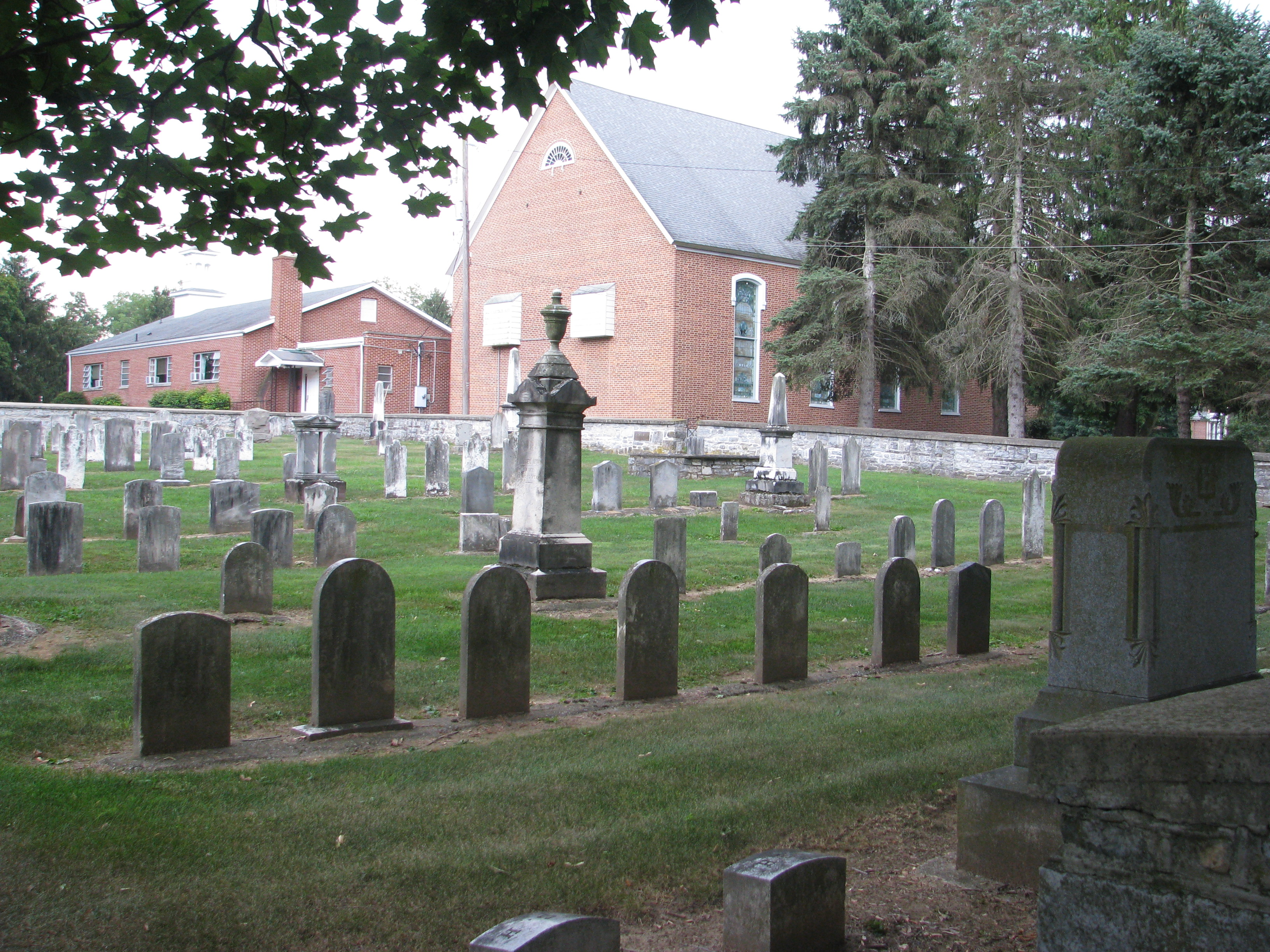
Lower Cemetery

Local historian Belle Swope wrote the following about her ancestors, Robert Quigley and his wife, Mary Jacob Quigley, who were among the early members of the Middle Spring Presbyterian Church at a time when it still held services in rural Pennsylvania.

[Robert and Mary Quigley] were members and regular attendants of the Middle Spring Presbyterian Church, which his parents were instrumental in organizing. Many members who were compelled to ford the creek, were irregular in their attendance, the stream at times being impassable, but not having the inconvenience of crossing the creek, he and his family were rarely absent from worship. The first minister was Rev. Thomas Craighead (1737–39). [Robert and Mary Quigley] sat under the preaching of the Rev. John Blair (1741–56) who succeeded Rev. Thomas Craighead, Rev. Robert Cooper from 1765 to 1797, and Rev. John Moodey D. D. who began his pastorate in 1803 and continued in charge of the congregation for nearly 52 years. Their neighbors and friends attended the same church, and the Sabbath was a day of pleasant reunion as well as a season of worship. In the early days of the settlement, a peaceful frame of mind was not enjoyed by the worshiper, for the fear of an Indian outbreak was the prevailing thought in each heart, but gradually their outrages subsided, and muskets were no longer stacked at the church door, nor did the anxious eyes of the family as they returned to the home scan the horizon for a flame or a curl of smoke, that might be the last of what was once their fireside, built by their hands.

== Original Church Replaced ==
The parishioners replaced the first log church with another in the 1760s. In turn, they replaced this church with the "Old Stone Church" in 1781. However, it suffered from a "structural defect". So, the congregation had to tear it down and replace it in 1847. At that time, they moved the church from where the old cemetery is still located (about one-tenth mile to the northwest) to its present location. A Christian Education Building was added to the 1847 sanctuary in 1964. There are four cemeteries associated with Middle Spring Church: the Lower Cemetery, the Upper Cemetery, and the Modern Cemetery; Hannah's Cemetery is located outside of Newburg.

== Famous Members ==
Many of the original settlers of Cumberland County are buried in the Middle Spring Presbyterian Church Cemeteries. Among those buried there are Hugh Brady and Hannah Brady, parents of Major John Brady (whose many exploits on the Pennsylvania frontier are commemorated in a monument in Muncy, Pennsylvania). They are also the grandparents of John's sons, Captain Samuel Brady, of Brady's Leap fame and of Samuel's brother, United States Army Major General Hugh Brady, both of whom attended this church. Their maternal grandparents James and Jeanette Quigley are buried there as well. John Maclay was a ruling elder during the time of Reverend Robert Cooper. Maclay was a delegate for Cumberland County at the Pennsylvania Provincial Conference in June 1776.{ A detailed modern history of Middle Spring Presbyterian Church is available in Paul E. Gill, Ye People of Hopewell: A 250th Anniversary History of the Middle Spring Presbyterian Church,(Shippensburg: 1988).}

== Gallery ==
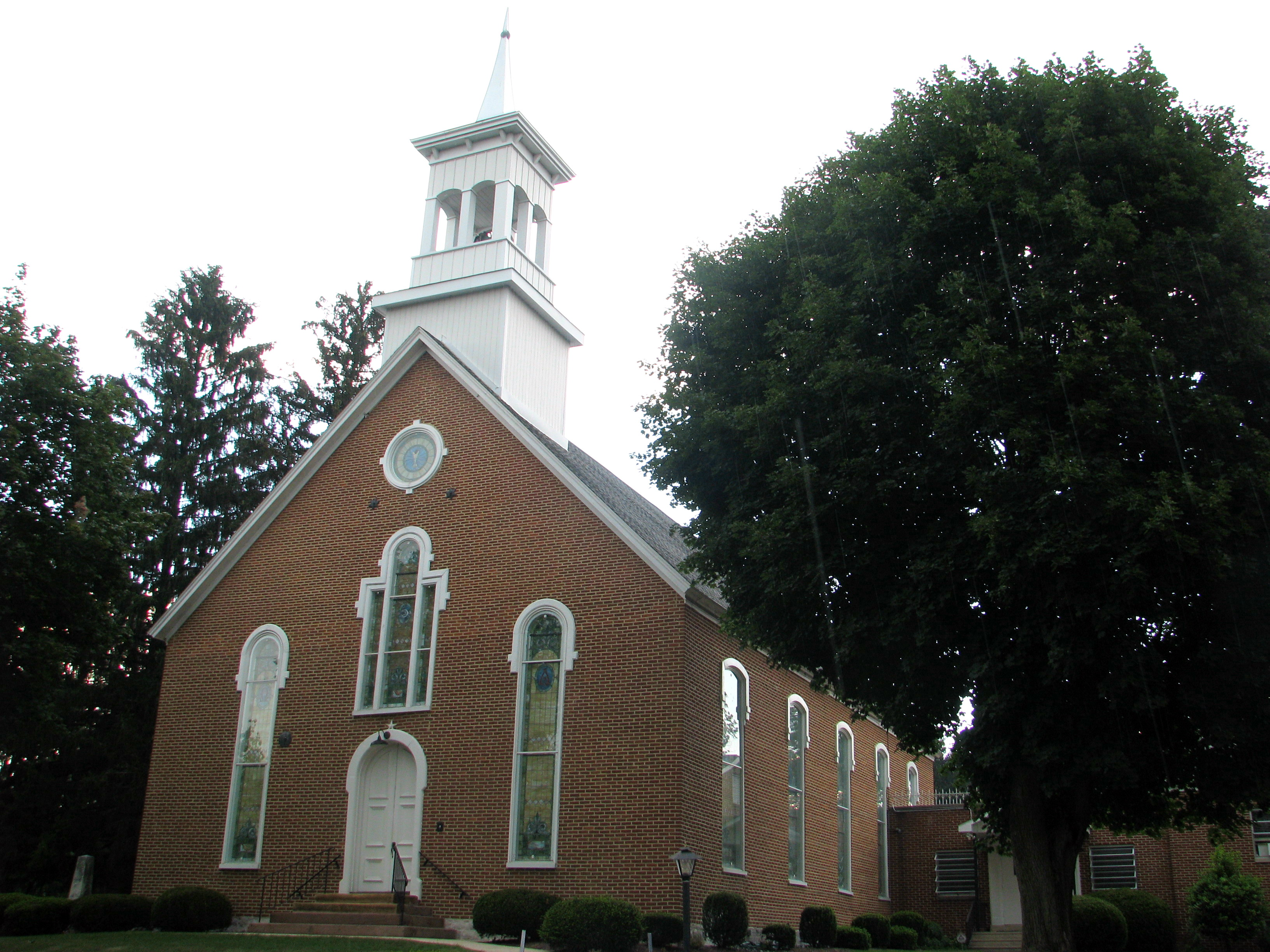
Middle Spring Church, 2008

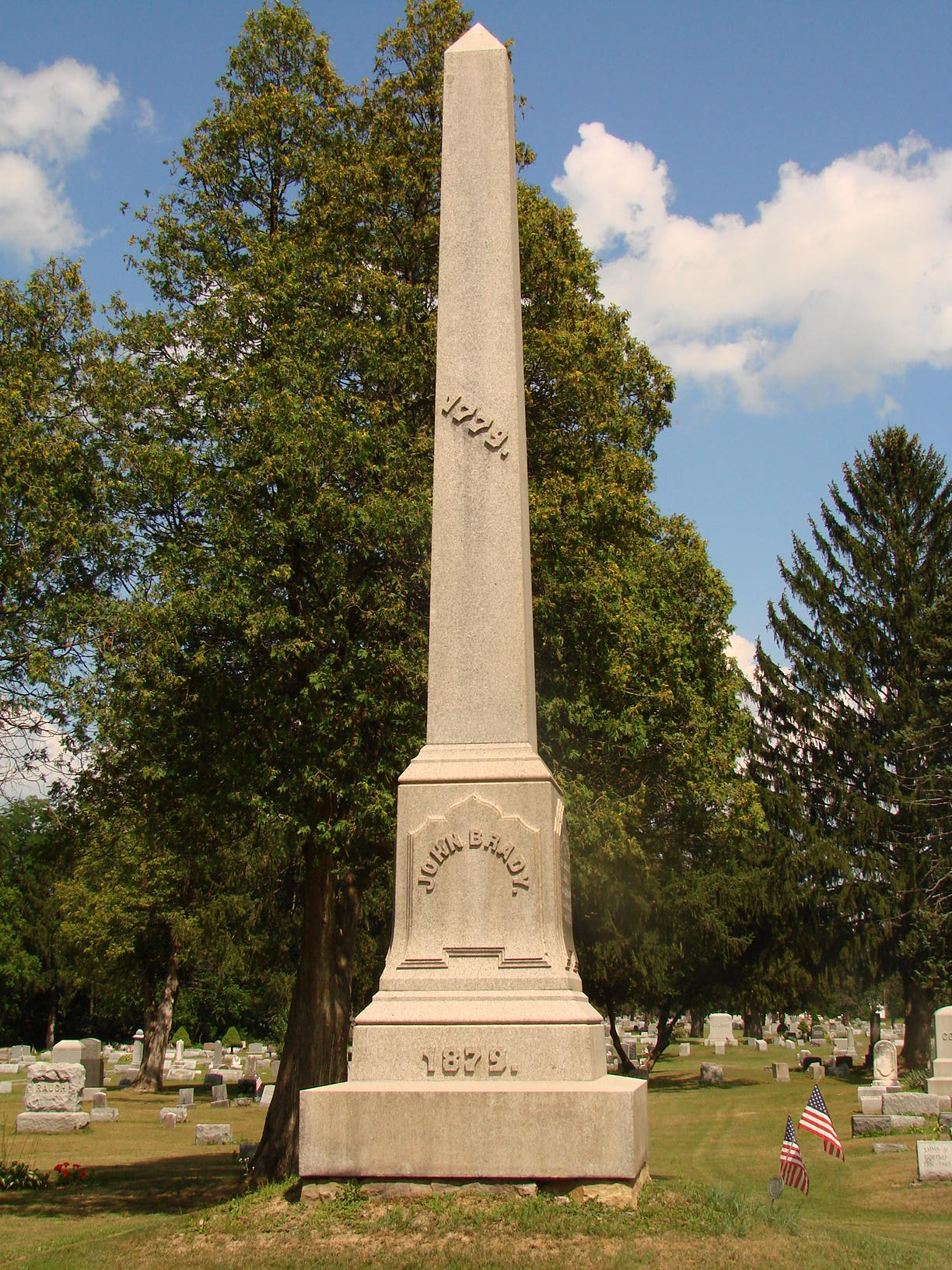
John Brady monument, Muncy, Pennsylvania
