= Samuel Brady =

Irish American Revolutionary War officer and frontier scout

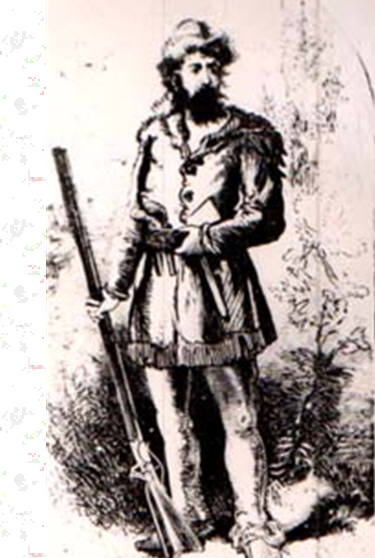
- Early illustration of Captain Samuel Brady, circa 18th-19th centuries
- Born: May 5, 1756; Shippensburg, Cumberland County, Province of Pennsylvania (British Royal Colony), British North America, British Empire, present-day Shippensburg, Cumberland County, Maryland
- Died: December 25, 1795 (aged 39); Short Creek, Ohio County, Virginia, present-day Brooke County, West Virginia
- Occupations: soldier, colonial militia officer, scout, Indian fighter
- Employer(s): Continental Congress and the U.S. Government
- Title: Captain
- Relatives: Hugh Brady

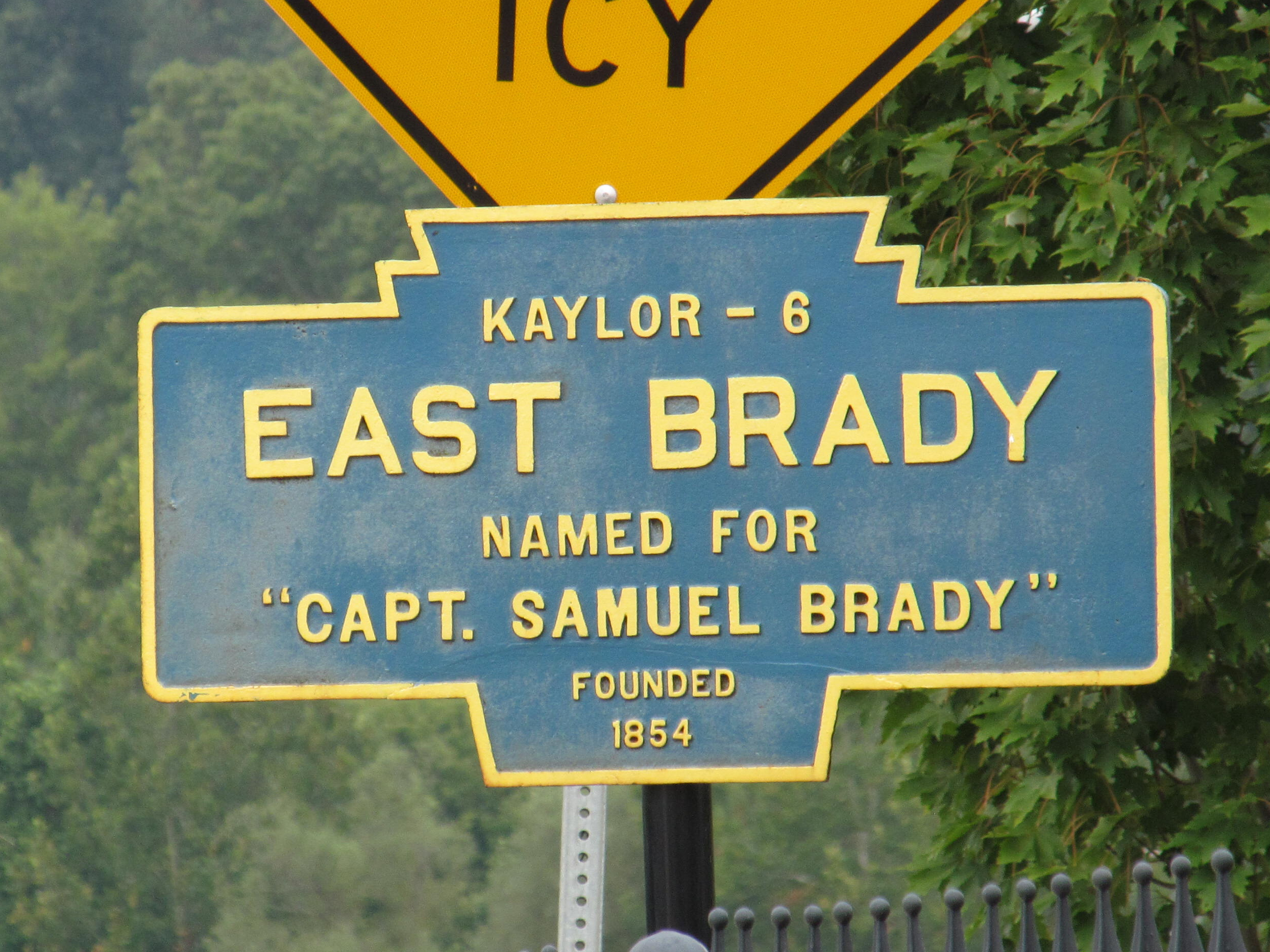
A Keystone Marker for East Brady, Pennsylvania, named for Samuel Brady.

Captain Samuel Brady (1756–1795) was an Irish American Revolutionary War officer, frontier scout, fighter against Native Americans, and the subject of many legends, in the history of western Pennsylvania and northeastern Ohio. He is best known for reportedly jumping across a gorge over the Cuyahoga River to escape pursuing Native Americans in what is present day Kent, Ohio. This jump is still remembered as "Brady's leap".

== Samuel Brady's family ==
Samuel Brady was born on May 5, 1756, in Shippensburg, Pennsylvania. His father was Capt. John Brady, who was born in 1733 near Newark, Delaware and who died April 11, 1779, near Muncy, Pennsylvania in an Indian attack. His mother was Mary Quigley Brady, who was born on August 16, 1735, in Hopewell Township, Cumberland County, Pennsylvania and died October 20, 1783, in Muncy, Lycoming County, Pennsylvania. Capt. John Brady and Mary Quigley Brady had thirteen children, three of whom died in infancy. Their children were Captain Samuel Brady, born 1756, James Brady, born 1758, William Brady, born 1760 and died in infancy, John Brady, born March 18, 1761, Mary Brady (Gray), born April 22, 1764, William Penn Brady, born August 16, 1766, General Hugh Brady, twin, born July 27, 1768, Jane Brady, twin, born July 27, 1768, Robert Quigley Brady, born September 12, 1770, Agnes Brady, born February 14, 1773, and died November 24, 1773, Hannah Brady (Gray), born December 3, 1774, Joseph Brady, born in August 1777 and died in infancy and Liberty Brady (Dewart), born August 9, 1778.

=== The Quigleys ===
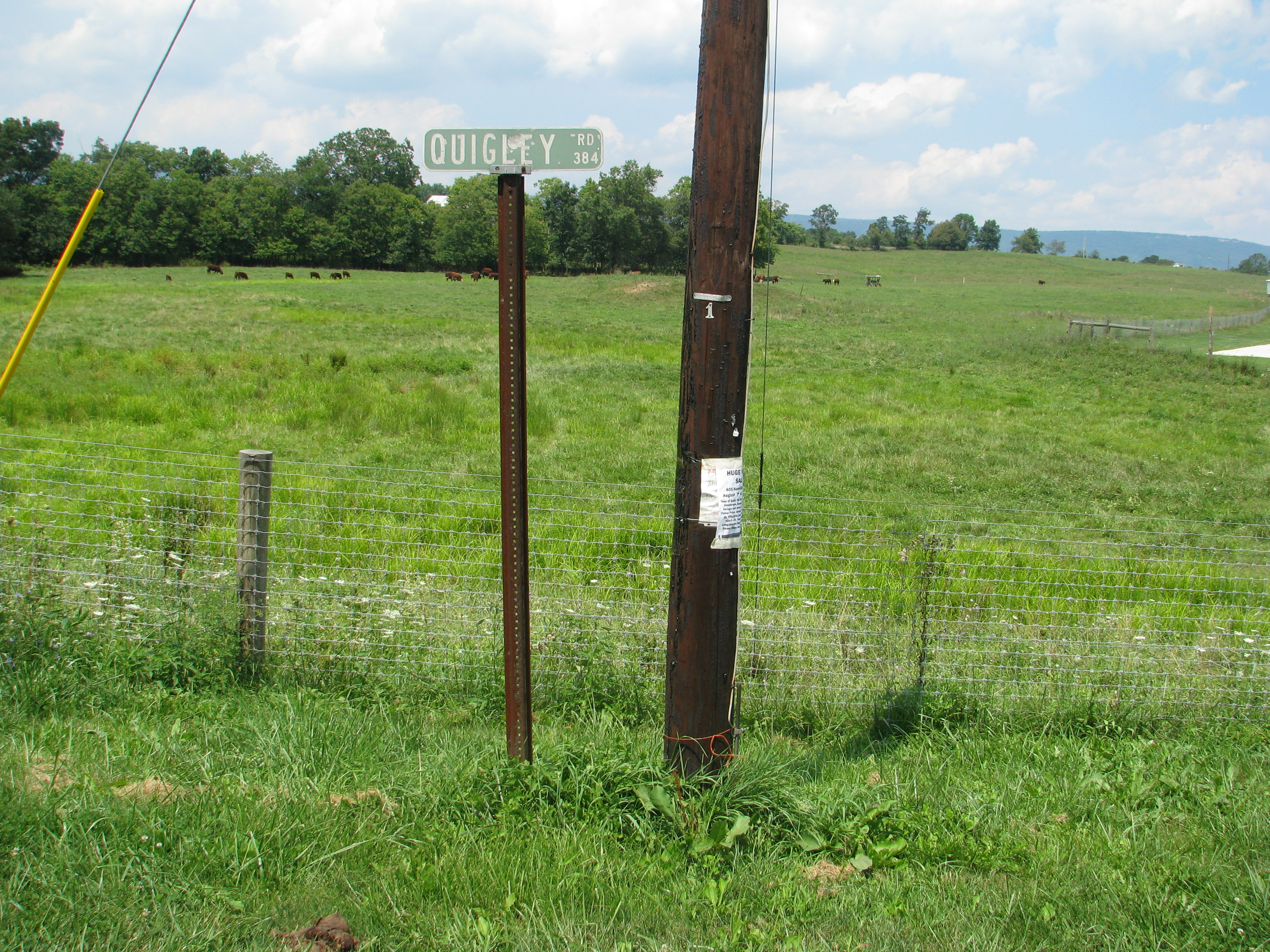
Quigley Road, Cumberland Co., Pa., runs past former Quigley house and crossed former Quigley Bridge

Samuel's Irish maternal grandfather, James Quigley, was born in about 1710 and came to America from Ireland in 1730. He settled on 400 acres (1.6 km^{2}) of frontier land, in what is today Hopewell Township, Cumberland County, Pennsylvania, close to present day Shippensburg, Pennsylvania. He built his wilderness home of logs close to the banks of Conodoguinet Creek. A bridge later built there caused the location of the Quigley homestead on Conodoguinet Creek to be later called "Quigley's Bridge", where generations of Quigleys continued to live long thereafter.

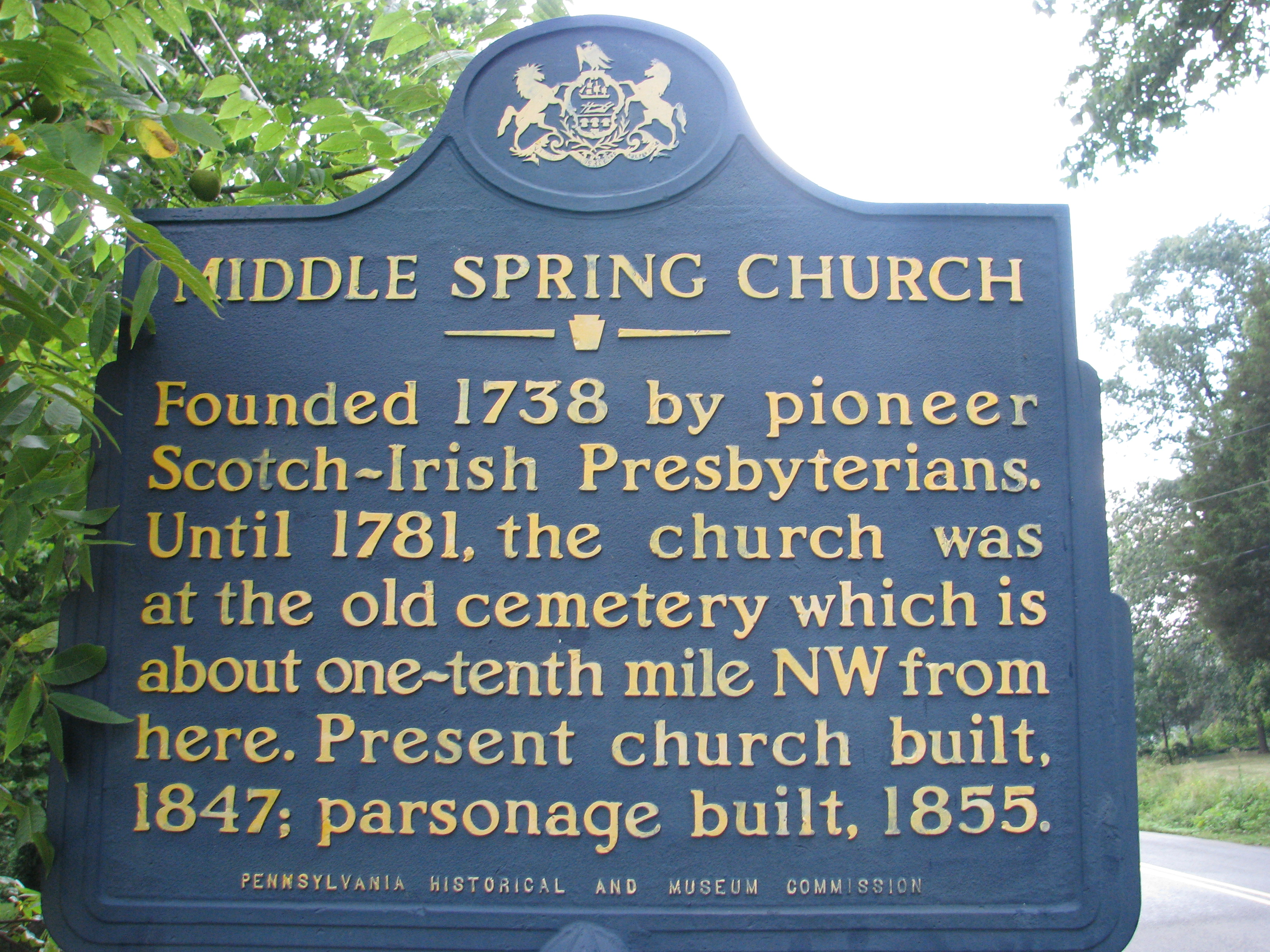
Plaque at Middle Spring Pennsylvania Presbyterian Church

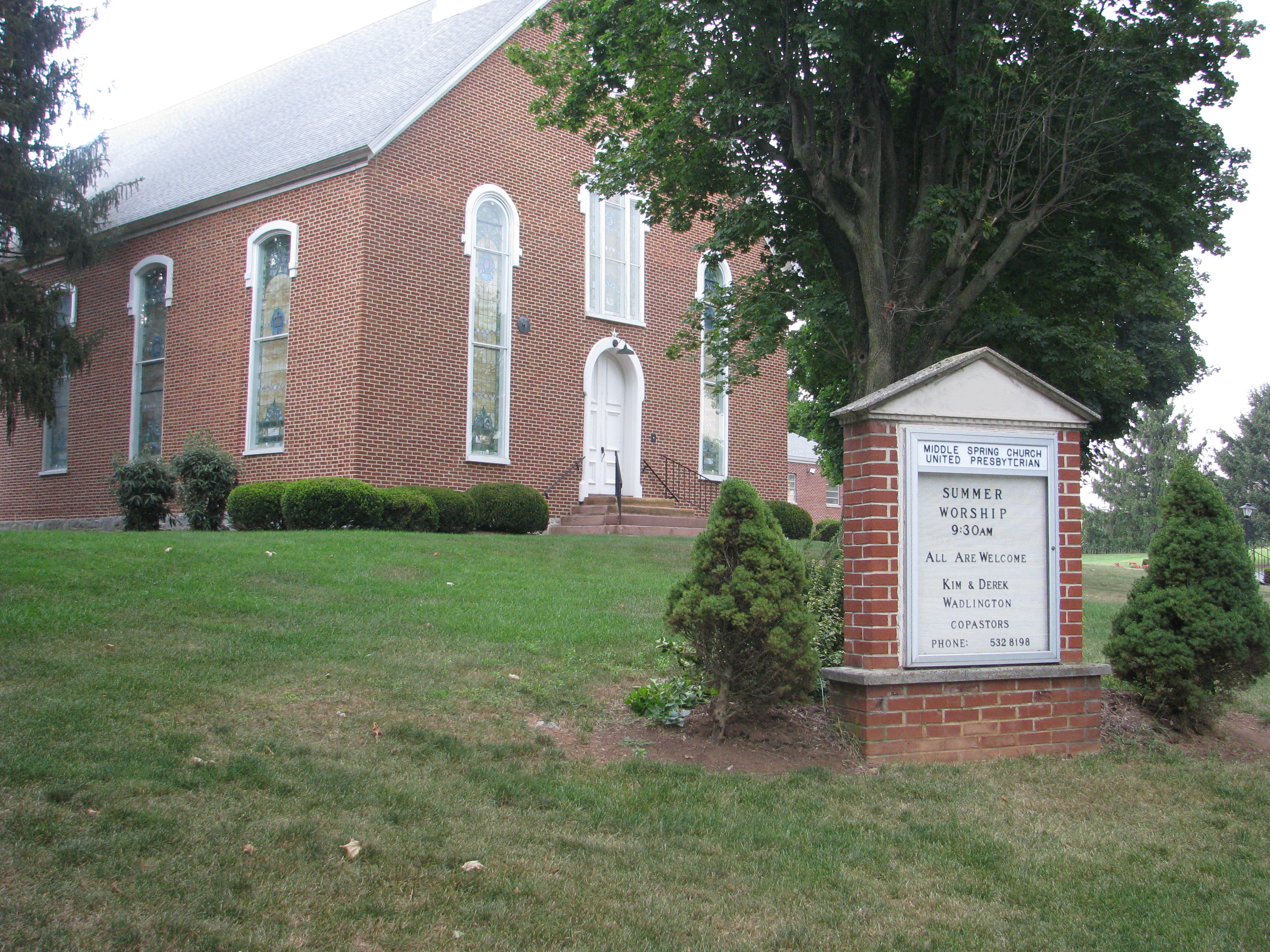
Rebuilt Middle Spring Pennsylvania Presbyterian Church

Little is known of James' wife, Jeanette, except that she was likely of Irish descent. However, according to local historian and author Belle Swope, "We are assured she was a devoted wife, a loving mother, and a wise counselor, or she would not have given to the world such brave and illustrious children." In 1738 the log Middle Spring Presbyterian Church was erected three miles (4.8 km) from their homestead, of which James and Jeanette Quigley became faithful members and in which they along with some of their children came to be buried in its old graveyard. James Quigley had to be and was ever vigilant to keep hostile Indians from killing his family and burning his home – a fate that befell many of his neighbors in those early days on the Pennsylvania frontier. In addition to successfully keeping his home and family safe, on March 25, 1756, James Quigley was commissioned ensign in the Cumberland County Colonial Rangers. He served as a private in the Revolutionary War. He died in 1782. They had six children, who were all born on their Hopewell Township homestead, namely, John Quigley, born in August 1731, Samuel Quigley, born in June 1733, Mary Quigley (Samuel Brady's mother), born August 16, 1735, Agnes Quigley, born in March 1737 or 1738, Martha Quigley, born in July 1741 and Robert Quigley, born in 1744, who married Mary Jacob. Robert Quigley eventually ended up living on the Quigley Homestead, at Quigley Bridge, Hopewell Township, Cumberland County, Pennsylvania. Robert Quigley and his sister Mary Quigley Brady remained very close throughout their lives.

=== The Bradys ===
As to the Brady grandparents of Captain Samuel Brady, author Belle Swope states, "No family of pioneers was more conspicuous in the early history and settlement of the country than the Bradys." Hugh Brady was born about 1709 in Ireland. His wife Hannah's maiden name was McCormick. One family tradition stated "the Bradys, McCunes, Sharps, McConnels, Youngs, and two other families came from County Derry (Londonderry) ... in one vessel and landed at Cape Henlopen, " but whether Hugh and Hannah actually met and married in Ireland or in America is not certainly known.

The Bradys first lived in Delaware where their son John, Captain Samuel Brady's father, was born in 1733. After making several moves filing land claims along the way west, Hugh and Hannah Brady eventually moved to a Presbyterian community on the banks of Conodoguinet creek at Middle Springs, Cumberland County, Pennsylvania by about 1738 or perhaps later, where they established a homestead close to where the Quigleys had already settled. They thereby became near neighbors of and fellow church members with James and Jeanette Quigley. There were nine children in the family, their names (and dates of birth) as follows: John (1733), Samuel (1734), Joseph (1735), Hugh II (1738), William (1740), Margaret (1742), Mary (1745), Ebenezer (1750), and James (1753). At least six of the seven sons are credited for military service during the Revolutionary War.

Church records show Hannah in 1776 living as a widow. Along with the Quigleys, Hugh and Hannah Brady are both buried in the old cemetery of the Middle Spring Presbyterian Church where in 1923 an organization of their descendants erected a memorial commemorating all eleven Brady family members.

=== Samuel's father Captain John Brady ===
Samuel's father John Brady was trained as a surveyor. On 18 April 1760, at the time of the war against the French and the Indians in the west, John Brady received his first commission as Ensign in the 1st Battalion, colonial troops.

==== French and Indian War ====
John Brady fought in the French and Indian War. The French and Indian War was a colonial war fought between the British, the French and the Indian allies of the French. The British possessions in North America were located on the Atlantic Coast of North America and the French possessions were located in present-day Canada, centered mostly in Quebec. Both the British and the French made conflicting territorial claims on their respective frontiers, principally in present-day Michigan, western Pennsylvania and Ohio. The dispute simmered and flashed for many years. In the end, Britain declared war on France on May 15, 1756. The war between Britain and France was fought on both sides of the Atlantic. In Europe, it was called the Seven Years' War. Indians fought for both armies. For instance, the Iroquois Confederacy allied itself with the American colonies and the Britain. However, most of the warring tribes in the conflict were allied with the French. The French encouraged their Indian allies to attack the British settlers on the Pennsylvania frontier. The killing and scalping of whole families in isolated cabins on the Pennsylvania frontier was common place. This area of Pennsylvania was the area where the Quigley and Brady families had settled and were determined to live. John Brady was among those who joined the forces to battle the Indian marauders. The French and Indian War ended on February 10, 1763, with the Treaty of Paris, in which France lost all of its North American territory east of the Mississippi and most of Canada.

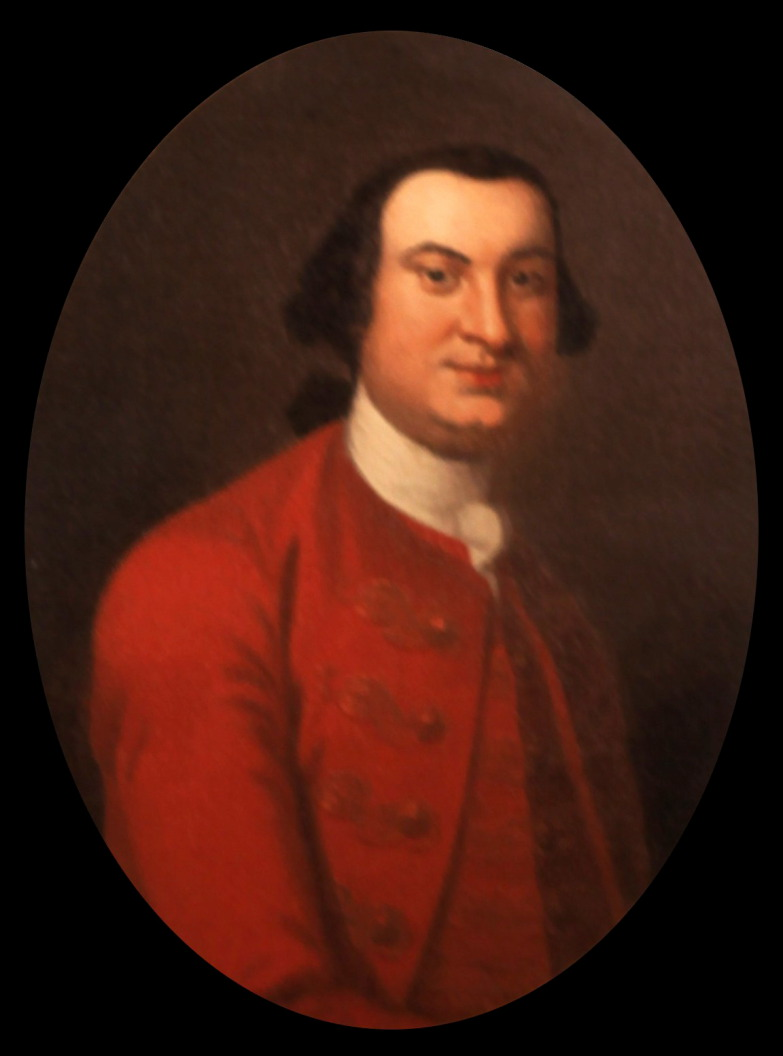
British Col. Henry Bouquet

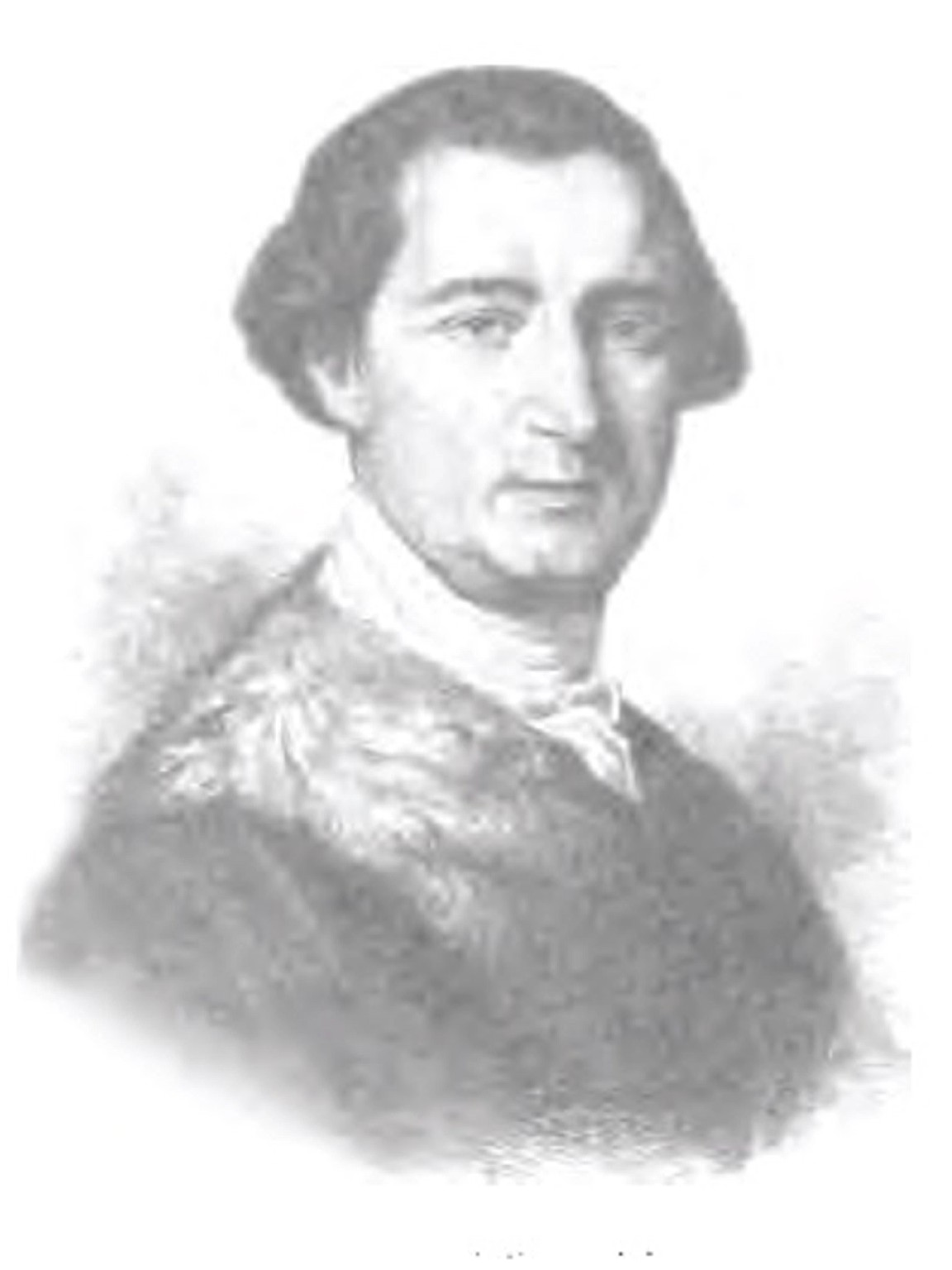
Pennsylvania Governor John Penn

==== Pontiac's War ====
However, the Indian threat on the Pennsylvania frontier did not end with the end of the French and Indian War. In 1763, Pontiac's War began pretty much where the French and Indian War left off. Ottawa Chief Pontiac persuaded the Indian tribes, which had been the French allies, to unite to continue battling the British. John Brady was commissioned as a captain on July 19, 1763, in the Second Battalion of the Pennsylvania Regiments, commanded by Governor John Penn, which Regiments fought in Pontiac's War. Captain John Brady actively fought against the Indian forces that were attacking and killing many frontier families in Bedford and Cumberland Counties, Pennsylvania. However, Pontiac took many frontier forts and settlements in present-day Michigan and Ohio. Pontiac's forces besieged Fort Pitt (now Pittsburgh), Fort Ligionier and Fort Bedford in Pennsylvania. British Col. Henry Bouquet organized a force that marched to lift these sieges, which it did. Bouquet became the commander of Fort Pitt. In the fall of 1764, Col. Henry Bouquet commanded an army of colonial militia and regular British troops from Fort Pitt that moved into the Ohio Country and forced the Shawnees, Senecas and Delawares to make peace. Captain John Brady served in the Pennsylvania forces that participated in this expedition.

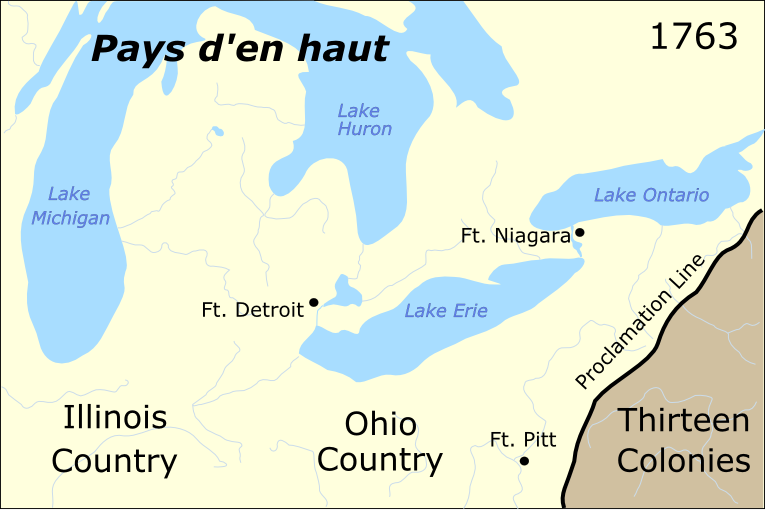
Map showing the area where Pontiac's War was fought

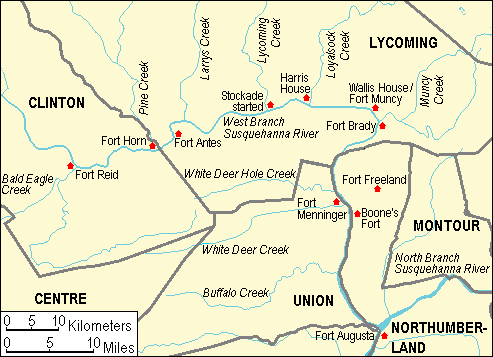
Map showing Fort Brady and Fort Muncy, Pennsylvania

==== Fort Brady ====
Samuel's father Captain John Brady received a land grant which was awarded to the officers who served in the Bouquet Expedition. He chose land east of present-day Lewisburg, Pennsylvania. He built a private stockade on this land in the Spring of 1776, close to present day Muncy, Pennsylvania, which he called "Fort Brady." John Brady's Muncy house was large for its day. He dug a 4-foot-deep (1.2 m) trench around it and emplaced upright logs in that trench side by side all the way around. He filled the trench with dirt and packed the dirt against the logs to hold the log wall solidly in place. This log wall ran about twelve feet high from the ground. He then held this wall in place upright by pinning smaller logs across its top, to keep the wall face steady and solid. The John Brady homestead was perilously close to the leading edge of the frontier of that time, the Susquehanna River. The other side of the Susquehanna was fiercely dominated by the Indians. The Indians resisted settler encroachment on their territory by routinely crossing the Susquehanna to raid the settlers. The settlers just as routinely crossed the Susquehanna to pursue the raiding war parties to retaliate and sometimes to rescue captives taken by the Indians during these raids. In this ongoing skirmishing, both sides committed unspeakable atrocities on the other, which drove a long-lasting cycle of revenge for revenge brutalities between the settlers and Indians. It was in the midst of this extreme danger and violence that Captain John Brady chose to settle his family, which set the stage for what happened to him and for what so greatly impacted and influenced his family—especially, his son, Continental Army Captain Samuel Brady.

== Front line service in the American Revolution ==
Bradys fought in every major battle of the first two years of the American Revolution.

=== Battle of Boston ===
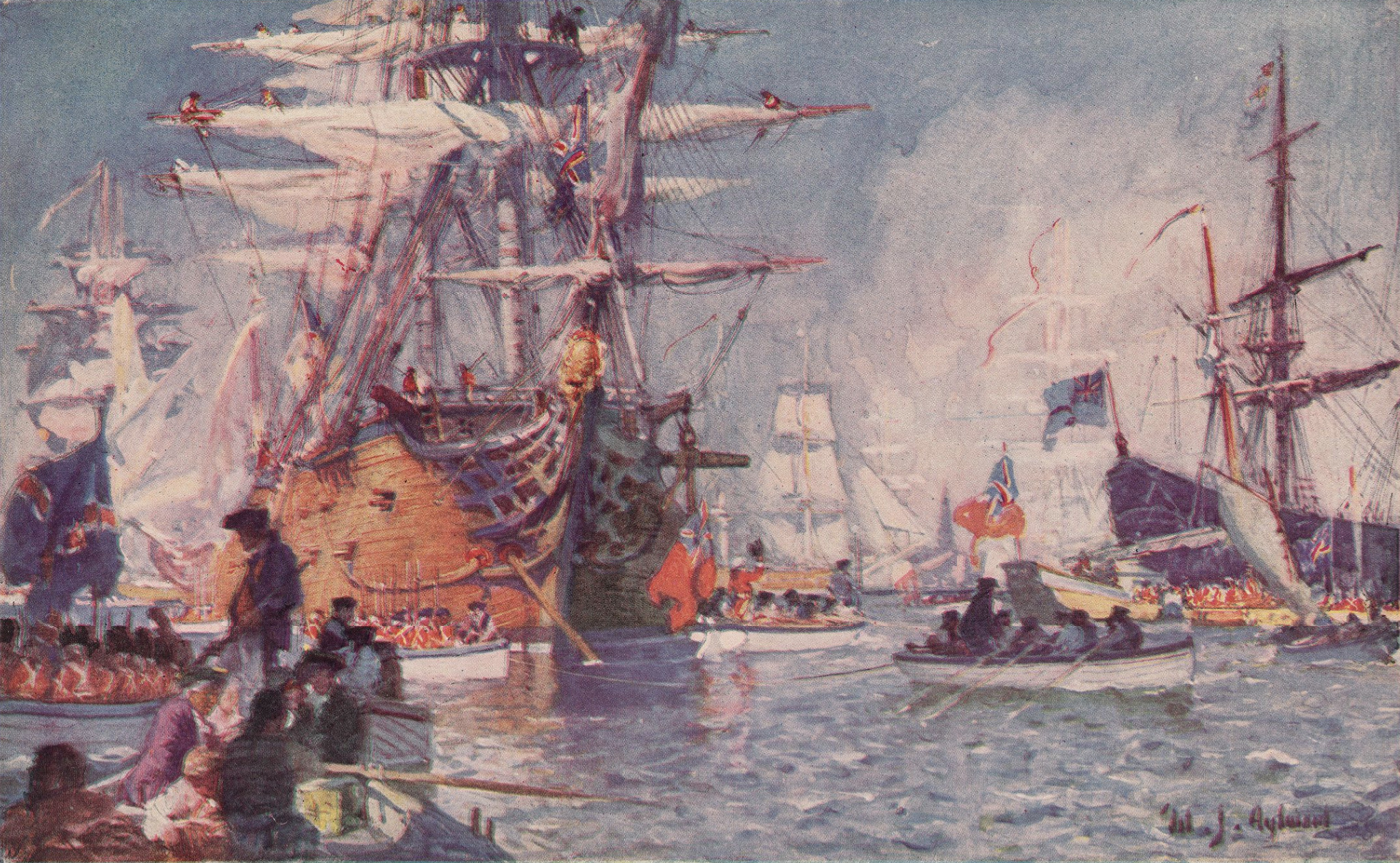
British evacuation of Boston

The first major battle of the Revolutionary War was the Battle of Boston. When the American Revolution broke out, Captain John Brady took his sons Samuel and James with him to fight in the trenches with General George Washington in Boston. Samuel and James Brady enlisted in the Continental Army as privates on August 3, 1775. Samuel was nineteen years old. Cecil B. Hartley, in his 1859 book about Samuel Brady's sometimes comrade, Lewis Wetzel gives this account of the service of Samuel Brady at the Battle of Boston.

Captain John Lowden, a widower, raised a company of volunteer riflemen, seventy in number and marched to Boston. Samuel Brady was one of this band, and the captain intended that he should be an officer, but his father objected, saying, 'Let him first learn the duty of a soldier, and then he will know how to act as an officer.' While the riflemen lay in the 'Leaguer of Boston' frequent skirmishes took place. On one occasion, Lowden was ordered to select some able-bodied men, and wade to an island, when the tide was out, and drive out some cattle belonging to the British. He considered Brady too young for this service, and left him out of his selection; but to the captain's astonishment, Brady was the second man on the island, and behaved most gallantly. On another occasion, he was sitting on a fence with his captain, viewing the British works, when a cannon ball struck the fence under them. Brady was first up, caught the captain in his arms and raised him, saying, with great composure, "We are not hurt, captain." Many like instances of his coolness and courage happened while the army lay at Boston.

—

Washington laid siege to Boston and, through the brilliant placement of his cannons on the hills overlooking the city and its harbor, forced the British Army to withdraw from Boston on March 17, 1776.

=== Battle of New York ===
However, the British could not and did not just accept defeat. They quickly returned to invade New York City by way of landing first on Long Island, New York, which they quickly took. The Battle of Long Island took place on August 27, 1776. It was the first major battle of the American Revolution that took place after the Continental Congress passed the Declaration of Independence. The British arrived with a sizable fleet, landed their army of some twelve thousand men. Under the overall command of Major General Lord William Howe, the British quickly outflanked and defeated Washington's defending forces. However, Samuel Brady, for his part, was commissioned a lieutenant in the Continental Army soon after he was twenty, because he distinguished himself at the Battle of Long Island. Samuel was five feet, eleven and three-fourths inches tall and weighed one hundred and sixty-eight pounds. His endurance in hardship, strength and agility had quickly showed themselves. His brother James was made a sergeant soon after he was eighteen.

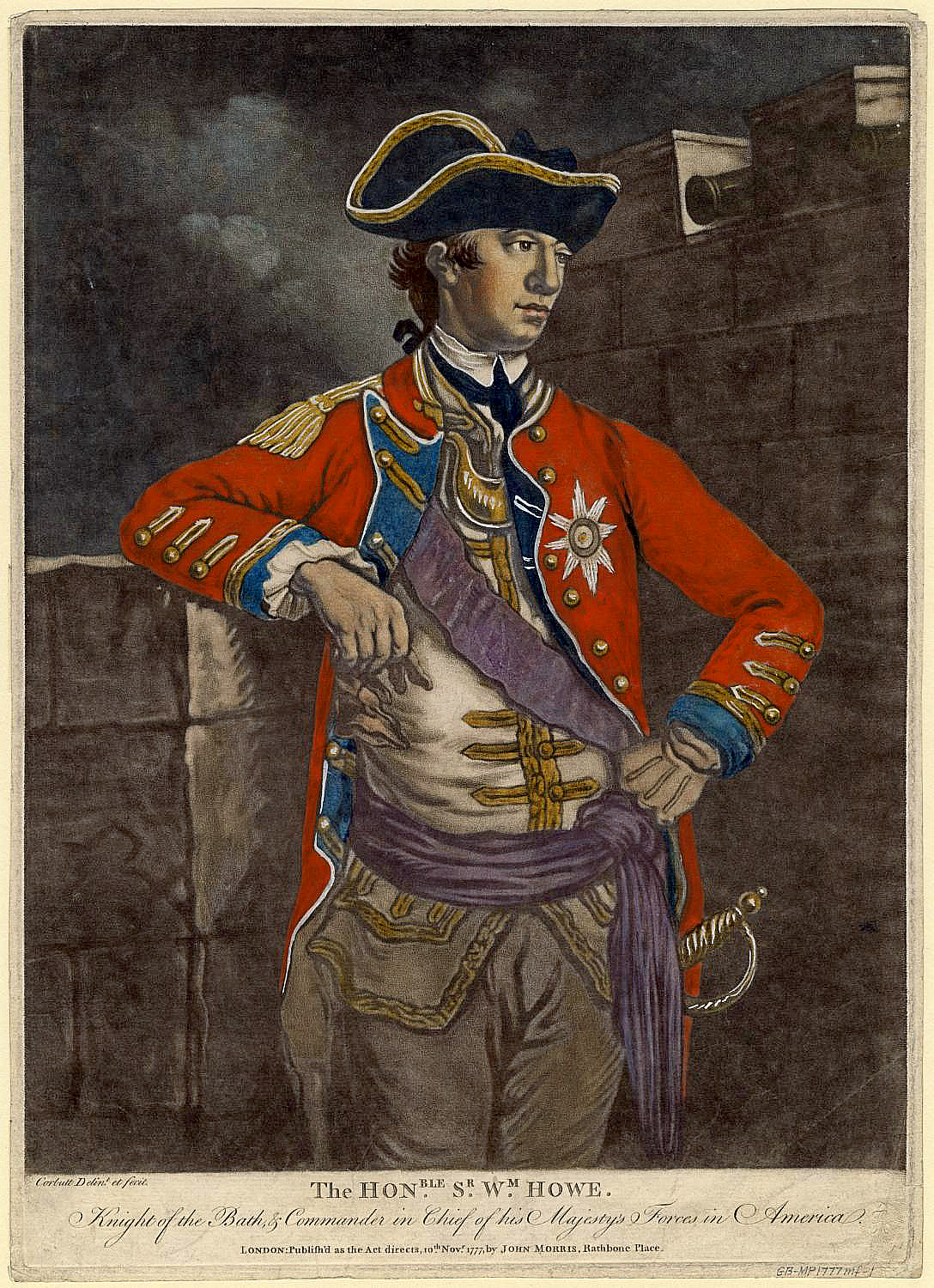
General William Howe

After taking Long Island, the British moved on Manhattan. On September 15, 1776, General Howe landed his twelve thousand man army in lower Manhattan and quickly captured New York City itself. George Washington had to withdraw to Harlem Heights, where he was able to hold for at time. Howe began to surround Washington's forces in October, which forced Washington to fall back even farther to a position close to White Plains, New York. Samuel Brady fought in this Battle of White Plains which took place on October 28, 1776. Once more Washington had to retreat. Fortunately for the Americans, General Howe let Washington make good his escape. The last American enclave on Manhattan Island was Fort Washington which fell to the British on November 16, 1776. The British cleared the last significant American presence in the area by capturing Fort Lee on the New Jersey side of the Hudson River.

=== Battle of Trenton ===
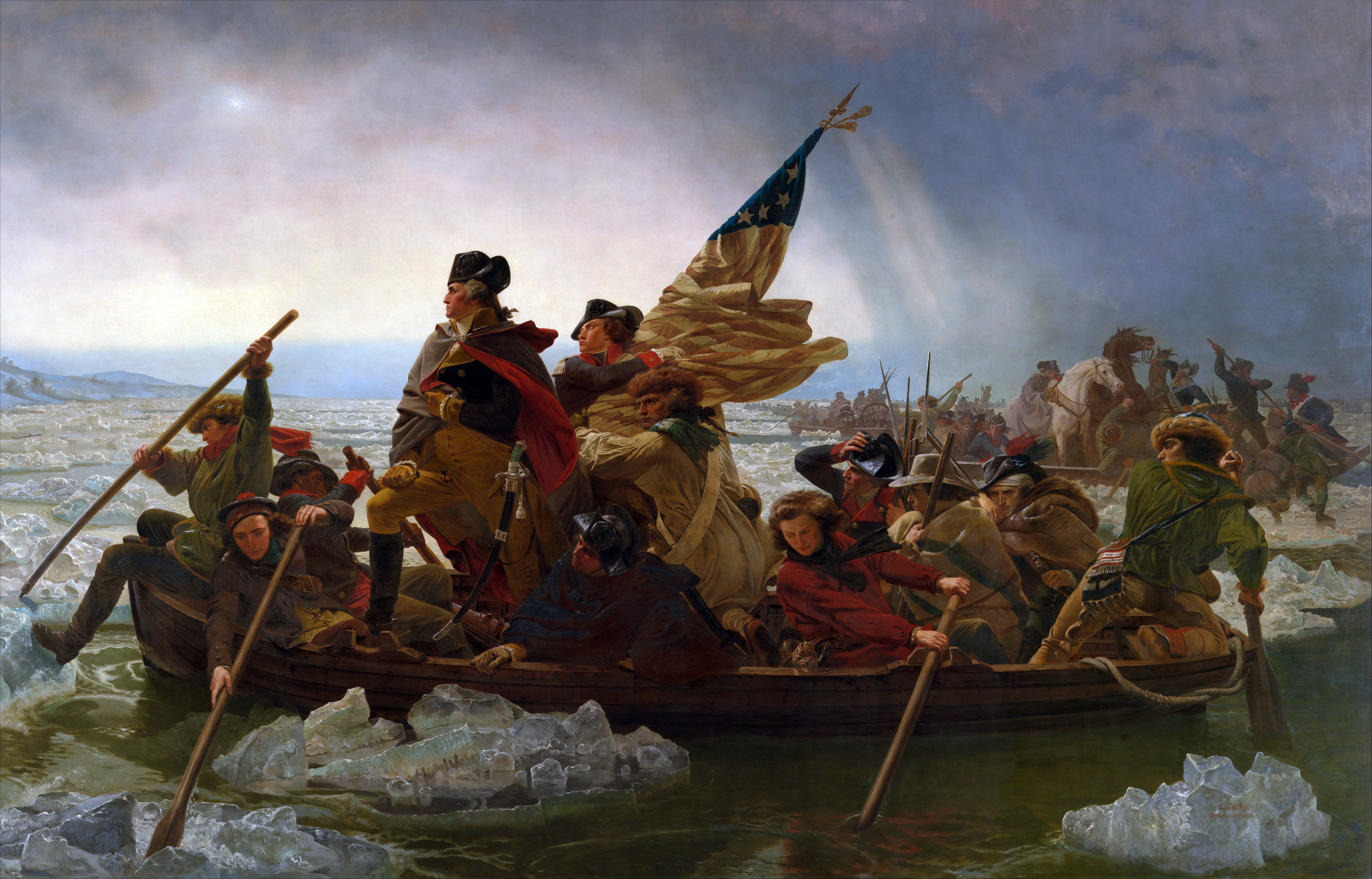
Washington crossing the Delaware

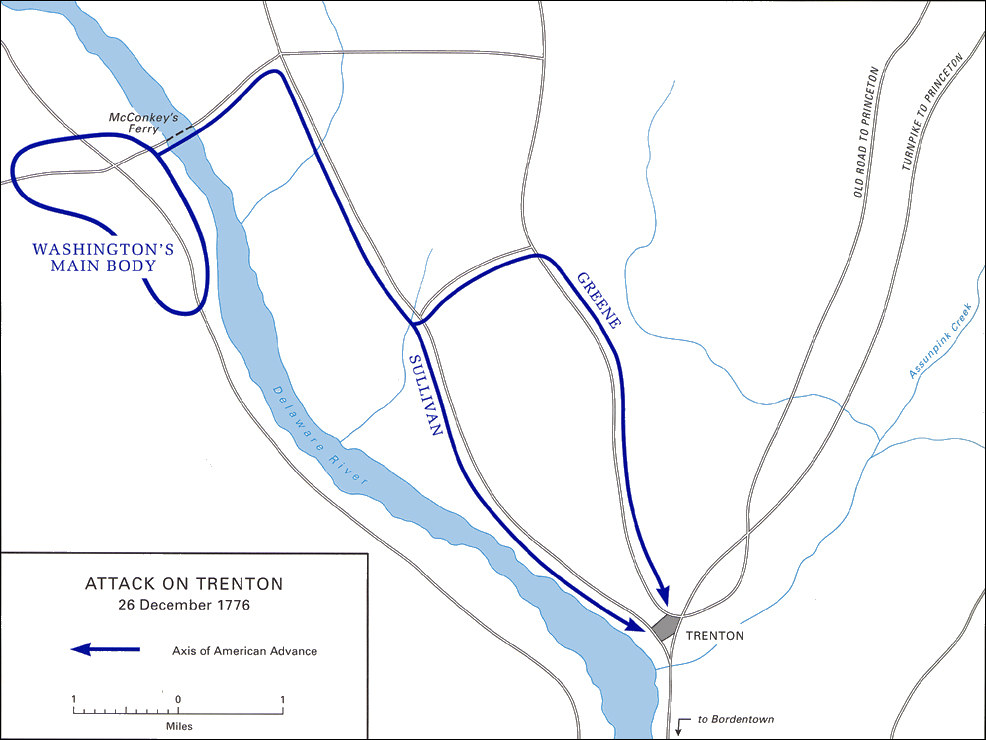
Map of the Battle of Trenton

After British General William Howe captured New York City from Washington in 1776 in the New York and New Jersey campaign, he began a slow advance south through New Jersey in the direction of the Continental Capital of Philadelphia. Samuel Brady was among those who handed General Howe an unpleasant setback, by crossing the Delaware River with General Washington to fight Howe's overconfident forces at the Battle of Trenton, which took place on the morning of December 26, 1776. Trenton, New Jersey was at that time a small town in western New Jersey. Three regiments of German forces hired by the British to fight the Colonials, called "Hessians," had occupied the settlement. As year end approached, Washington had been retreating through New Jersey ahead of the British. Lost battles and constant retreat had put the morale of his army at low ebb. Many soldiers left the army as soon as their enlistments were up and others just deserted. Some of Washington's generals just ignored his orders, insulted that they had not been chosen instead of him to lead the army. Washington needed a victory for the Revolution to survive. Washington's made a hazardous nighttime crossing of the Delaware River on the night of December 25–26, 1776. He marched his tattered force of about two thousand four hundred men over the snow-covered ground to Trenton, many of his soldiers shod only with bleeding rags for shoes. General Washington attacked the Hessians in the morning and completely overwhelmed them at the cost of only light casualties to his own forces. Samuel Brady, therefore, was very much a part of this very crucial battle that gave the Americans their much needed victory and effectively kept the American Revolution alive.

=== Battle of Princeton ===
Samuel Brady also fought at the Battle of Princeton on January 3, 1777. Leading up to this Battle of Princeton, there had been a Second Battle of Trenton, sometimes referred to as the Battle of the Assunpink Creek, which took place on January 2, 1777. General Washington expected the British to counter-attack, after his victory over the Hessians at Trenton. He decided to mount a stand against that counterattack at Trenton. On December 30, 1776, Washington positioned his troops on high ground south of Trenton, defending the far bank of a creek called Assunpink Creek. On January 2, 1777, the bulk of the British army arrived late that afternoon under the command of British General Charles Cornwallis and came face to face with Washington's defenses. Only Assunpink Creek separated them. Cornwallis ordered a charge across a bridge that spanned the creek. The British took heavy casualties in several unsuccessful attempts to take the bridge. Samuel Brady almost had to have been on the firing line of this defense, since Belle Swope places him at the battles before and after it. Anyway, when night arrived, the Continentals still were solidly on the far side of that bridge. The British fell back to regroup and deal with their hundreds of casualties. Ever contemptuous of the tattered Americans, Cornwallis pronounced to his battered force, "Rest for now. We'll bag the fox in the morning." That night, Washington burned his campfires bright and slipped away in the night, leaving the British to their blissful slumber. Washington then night marched his army around Cornwallis and to attack the British at Princeton, New Jersey. The British forces in Princeton were principally passing through on their way to join Cornwallis in Trenton. Washington attacked them. Samuel Brady was in the thick of this battle. This attack turned into a back and forth battle in an orchard in which both sides took many casualties and the issue for the Americans became much in doubt. Washington personally and at great personal risk rushed up on horseback to lead the charge to save the day for his faltering army and, at the same time, to inflict a defeat on the British forces on hand. Cornwallis was shocked to hear gunfire and cannonade in his rear. He rushed his army to Princeton, to find that Washington's army had again slipped away.

=== Battle of Brandywine Creek ===
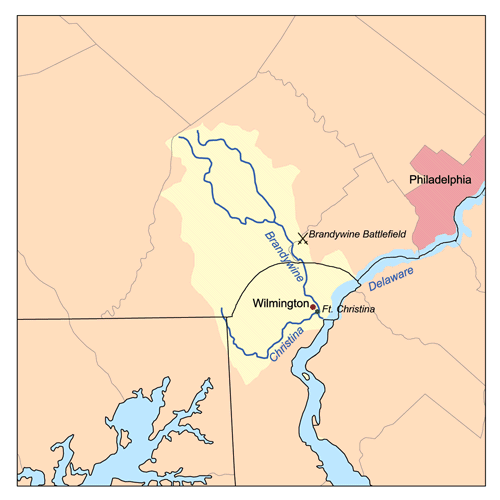
Location of Brandywine Battlefield

General Howe began his push to take Philadelphia itself in 1777. General Washington made his last major stand to protect the Continental Capital at the fords across the Brandywine River in the Battle of Brandywine. This battle was fought at a point in Pennsylvania some thirty miles southwest of Philadelphia. General Washington deployed General Anthony Wayne's Pennsylvanians to the high ground near Chadds Ford on the Brandywine to defend this river crossing, which provided the best passage across the Brandywine River on the road from Baltimore to Philadelphia. Lt. Samuel Brady fought under General Wayne at Chad's Ford. While General Washington did defend the other fords across the Brandywine, on September 11, 1777, General Howe flanked him and won the day. However, General Howe was slow to follow up on his victory at Brandywine, which allowed the bulk of the Continentals to escape to fight another day. Samuel's fifteen-year-old brother, John, went with his father to the Battle of Brandywine to gather horses. However, he picked up a rifle and joined the line, where he was wounded. Samuel's father, Captain John Brady was shot in the mouth at the Battle of Brandywine, which caused him to lose several teeth. Soon thereafter John fell victim to pleurisy, which caused the army to send him home. When Washington mustered out such officers, he still counted on them to return to their frontier homes and there organize the defenses against the ever-increasing Indian attacks. One result of Captain John Brady's stay with his family that winter was his daughter, Liberty, whom Captain Brady did not live to see grow up.

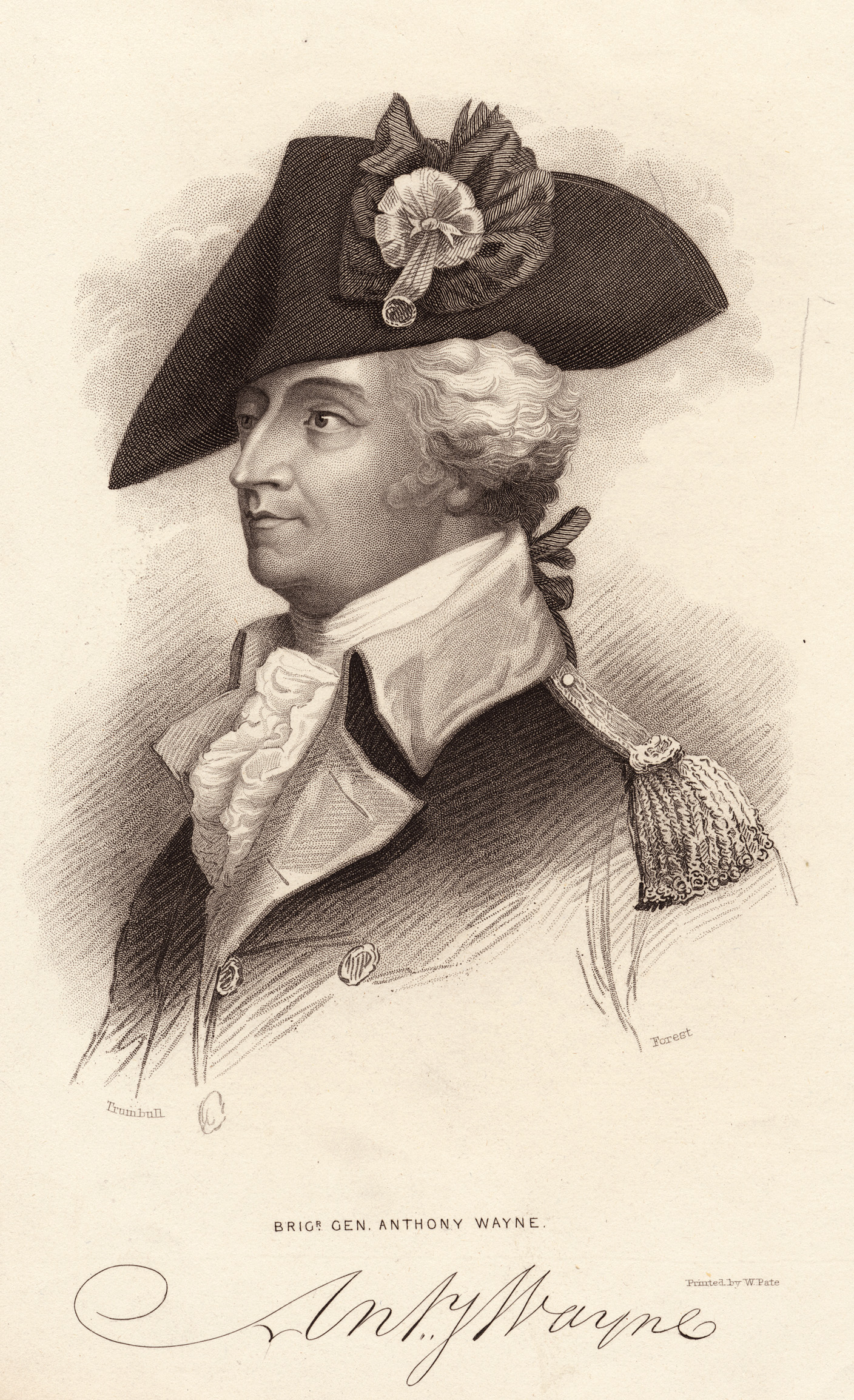
General Anthony Wayne

=== Battle of Paoli ===
Samuel Brady's actions in the Revolutionary War were especially remembered for his exploits at the American defeat at the Battle of Paoli in Chester County, Pennsylvania. Following his defeat at the Battle of Brandywine Creek, General Washington retreated towards Philadelphia. The British commander, Lieutenant General William Howe moved his army through Chester County, Pennsylvania towards the Schuylkill River on his advance toward Philadelphia, the Colonial Capital. Washington deployed Major General Anthony Wayne's Division of Pennsylvania Continentals on the east bank of Schuylkill River to harass British forces from the rear. General Wayne advanced his Pennsylvanians near to the British rear and set up camp at the crossroads close to a tavern called the "General Paoli Tavern", named for a Corsican outlaw. Wayne's orders were to wait for the British to advance and then attack their supply wagons. There were many Loyalists living in this area and they informed the British of the Continental Army's deployments. Not only that, soldiers from both sides often fraternized in the same taverns between battles. As a result, General Howe knew exactly where Wayne's Division was deployed and also knew pretty much the number in his forces.

On September 20, 1777, General Howe attacked General Wayne's Pennsylvanians near the General Paoli Tavern, which gave the battle its name. Howe's troops approached by night with no flints in their muskets so no shot would accidentally betray their approach. They forced a local blacksmith to guide them. They attacked Wayne's forces through adjoining woods. The surprised Pennsylvanians could do nothing but flee in disorder. The British killed 201 American troops in the attack and captured a further 71. There was an opening in the fence on the perimeter of the American camp through which some of Wayne's forces were able to escape. Lt. Samuel Brady was among those who escaped and helped others to escape. Belle Swope gives this account of this exploit, which perhaps says much about his ability to leap when necessary: "He escaped Paoli, at the time of the massacre, and leaped across a deep enclosure, which enabled him to assist in saving a number of lives. The chasm was so wide, that from his remarkable leap, he was called 'The Jumper'. The British were so close to him that as he jumped across a fence, they impeded his progress, by pinning with bayonets his blanket coat to the rails. He tore himself free, shot a cavalryman, who was close to him, ran to a swamp, where he with fifty five men who had escaped, joined the Army in the morning."

=== Battle of Germantown ===
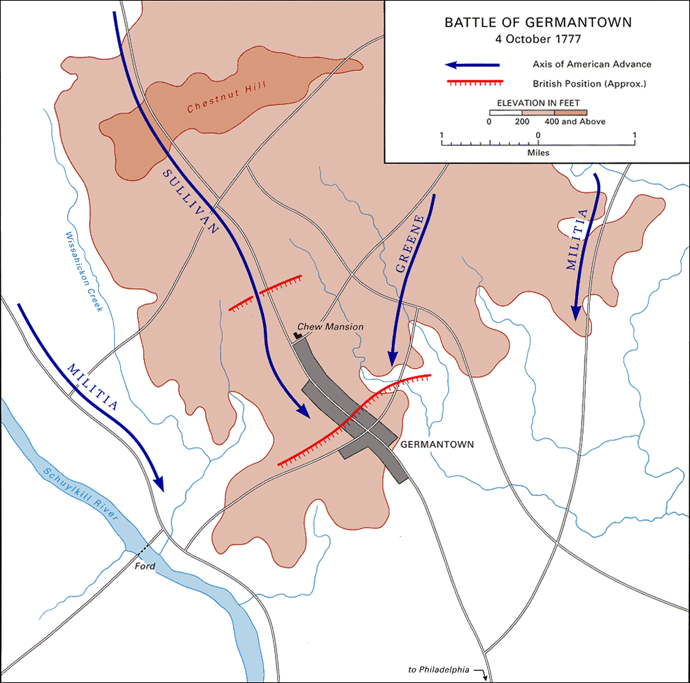
Map of Battle of Germantown

Philadelphia fell to the British on September 26, 1777. The Continental Congress safely relocated in York, Pennsylvania and demanded that General Washington take back the Capital. Washington resisted these demands, calling any such effort "suicidal". However, there did follow the fall of Philadelphia the last battle Samuel Brady fought as a regular battle line soldier, which was the Battle of Germantown. General Howe garrisoned Philadelphia with three thousand men. He then marched a force of nine thousand men about five miles (8.0 km) north to Germantown, Pennsylvania, from which he intended to find and eliminate the Continental Army once and for all. General Washington saw this division of forces as vulnerability and he decided to attack these forces in Germantown—hopefully, by surprise. He saw this attack as his last punch at the British invaders before winter set in. General Washington planned to surprise the British at night with several units and from different directions. However, his army moved slower than hoped and suffered from poor coordination. His forces arrived at dawn on October 4, 1777. The Americans almost immediately ran into forward British units, which put up a heroic defense and slowed the American advance considerably. In the end, there was little, if any element of surprise, and the British stoutly repulsed the Colonials at heavy cost to the Colonials.

=== Valley Forge ===
After his defeat at the Battle of Germantown, Washington set up camp at Valley Forge, where the hardships endured by the Continental Army that cold winter are legendary. Samuel Brady likely wintered with George Washington at Valley Forge in that terrible winter of 1777 and 1778.

== Service on the frontier during the American Revolution ==
In the spring of 1778, General Washington logically deployed the Pennsylvanians to the Pennsylvania and Ohio frontiers (their home territory, with which they would have both familiarity with the territory and a passion to defend it), where they mounted a successful expedition against the tribes around the Muskingum River in the Ohio Country. In June 1778, they returned to Pennsylvania to repair and man Fort Muncy, which was on the frontier in present-day Northumberland County, Pennsylvania. From there, they defended local settlers from the tribes who were allied with the British. Samuel Brady served as a scout with these forces. George Washington sent Samuel Brady on special assignments and even wrote a letter to his commander, Col. Daniel Brodhead, of the Eighth Pennsylvania, commending Samuel for his services. According to Belle Swope, "he was noted for skill and daring, and was everywhere quoted as the scout who shot to kill." Samuel Brady was promoted to Captain in the Continental Army on August 2, 1779.

=== Death of brother James at hands of Indians ===
Much of Samuel's zeal for fighting and, indeed killing, Indians doubtlessly originated in the deaths at their hands of his brother, James Brady on August 8, 1778, and his father, Captain John Brady in close succession on April 11, 1779. As the story goes, James Brady had a full head of handsome red hair, which, as was the custom of the day, he wore long and tied up at the back. James Brady and others, had his hair "done up" by a Mrs. Buckalow. "He was lively and full of nonsense, and she said to him, 'Ah, Jim, I fear the Indians will get this red scalp of yours yet.' 'If they do', he replied, 'it will make a bright light on a dark night'. In less than a week he fell a prey to the tomahawk, and the savages held his scalp as a trophy."

The Indians killed the family of a Peter Smith on June 10, 1778. His farm was on the banks of Bull Run, close to present day Williamsport, Pennsylvania. Men were sent from Fort Muncy to help him bring in his crop. A corporal and a party of three militia men were also sent from Fort Muncy to protect them all. James Brady was in this party of soldiers and was, as the bravest among them, selected their "captain", as was the custom when no commissioned officer was present. Four of their party returned to Fort Muncy that night. In the morning, the Indians attacked the remaining party under the cover of the morning fog.

A panic seemed to seize the party and they all fled, with the exception of young Brady, who ran for his rifle, pursued by three Indians. When he was within a few feet of it he was fired at, but falling over a sheaf of grain the shot missed him. He immediately arose, and as he was in the act of grasping his rifle, he was wounded by a shot in the arm from an Indian. He succeeded in getting a hold of his gun and shot the first Indian dead. Then he caught up another gun and brought down a second savage, when the party closed around him. Being stout, active and brave, he fought them vigorously for a few minutes. Finally he was struck in the head with a tomahawk and almost immediately afterwards received a thrust from a spear, which so stunned him that he fell. He had no sooner fallen than he was pounced upon and his scalp ruthlessly torn from his head. It was considered a great trophy by the Indians, as he had very long and remarkably red hair. A little Indian was then called and made to strike a tomahawk into his head in four places. The Indians then hurriedly fled.

—

Miraculously, young James survived this attack. He made it to a cabin where their aged cook, Jerome Vanness was hiding. Vanness dressed James' wounds as best he could, refusing James's request that he flee for his own life. He returned James' rifle and, at James request, took him to the river bank. A relief force arrived from Fort Muncy the next morning. James, believing them to be Indians returning, jumped up with his rifle, ready to battle them. They took him to the home of his mother, Mary Quigley Brady in Sunbury, Pennsylvania by boat. She rushed to the river to meet them. The grief of this hardened frontier woman was reported to have been "pitiable to behold." James Brady only lasted five days after his arrival at his mother's home. He finally succumbed to his wounds on August 13, 1778. Samuel Brady rushed home, but arrived after his brother's death. However, he swore he would avenge his brother's death. Unfortunately, the location of James' grave, supposed to have been near Fort Augusta, Pennsylvania, has been long forgotten. Belle Swope says, "He was deeply mourned for he was a great favorite with all who knew him."

=== Death of his father John at hands of Indians ===
Samuel's father, Captain John Brady, having recovered and seen to the safety of his family by leaving them at Fort Muncy, returned to active duty on September 1, 1778. Obviously, however, the life of John's wife, Mary Quigley Brady was nearly as hard as her husband's on the firing line of the Revolution. She kept her younger sons working the farm. They all had to be constantly alert to the danger of a surprise Indian attack. This ordeal wore on her health considerably. She gave birth to her last and thirteenth child just four days before her son, James, succumbed to his wounds in her home. She named this last child, Liberty to commemorate the just declared American independence. She made sure that the minister who christened the child knew that her infant with the genderless name of Liberty was a girl so he would use "she" and "her" in the baptismal prayer for the child's welfare, which he gladly did to her considerable gratification. The name Liberty stayed in the Quigley family for many generations thereafter.

Captain John Brady was also killed in an Indian ambush on April 11, 1779, according to author Belle Swope.

In the Spring of 1779 he received orders to join Colonel Hartley on the West Branch, and on the 11th of April, 1779, was killed by a concealed body of Indians. He had taken an active part in efforts to subdue their atrocities, and his daring and repeated endeavors intensified their hatred and desire to capture him resulting so fatally on that spring-time morning. With a guard and wagon he went up the river to Wallis' to procure supplies. His family was living at the 'Fort' at Muncy during the winter and early spring, and from his home to the provision house was only a few hours' ride. On their return trip, about three miles from Fort Brady, at Wolf Run, they stopped to wait for the wagon, which was coming another way. Peter Smith, whose family was massacred on the 10th of June, and on whose farm young James Brady was mortally wounded, was by his side. Captain John Brady said: 'This would be a good place for Indians to hide'. Smith replied in the affirmative, when the report of three rifles was heard, and the Captain fell without uttering a sound. He was shot with two musket balls between the shoulders. Smith mounted the horse of his commander and escaped to the woods unharmed, and on to the settlement. It was not known what Indians did the shooting, but proof was evident that a party had followed him with intent to kill. In their haste, they did not scalp him, nor take his money, a gold watch, and his commission, which he wore in a bag suspended from his neck, his dearest earthly possession. Thus perished one of the most skilled and daring Indian fighters, as well as one of the most esteemed and respected of men, on whose sterling qualities and sound judgment the pioneers of the entire settlement depended.

—

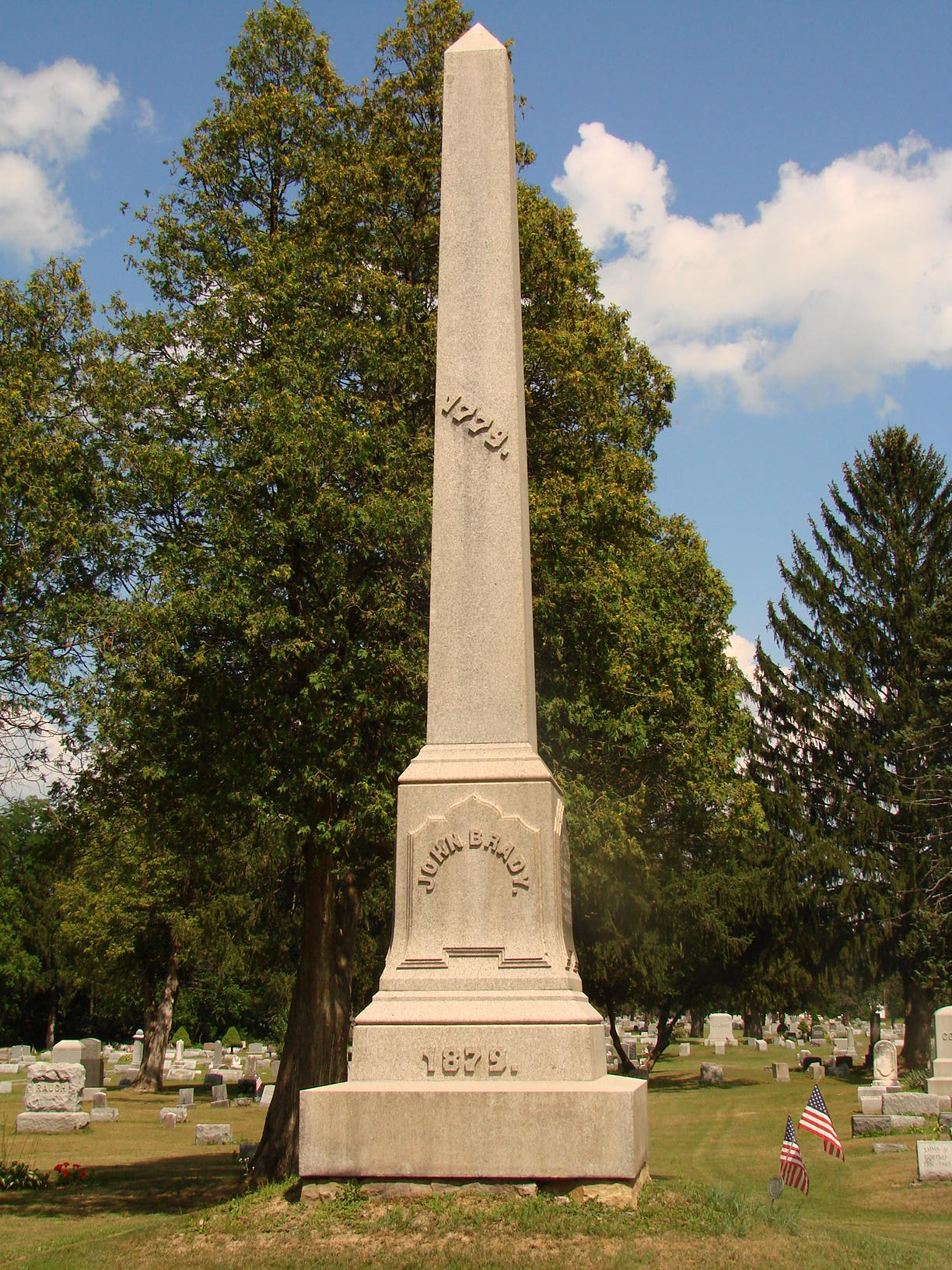
Monument to John Brady, Muncy, Pennsylvania

Captain John Brady's comrades carried his body to his home at Fort Brady (within the city limits of present-day Muncy, Pennsylvania). His widow was presented with the grisly sight of his blood-covered body, all too soon after being presented with the sight of her horribly injured son, James. John Brady was buried on a hillside near his home, where a hundred years later, a monument was erected in his memory and in tribute to his many heroic deeds.

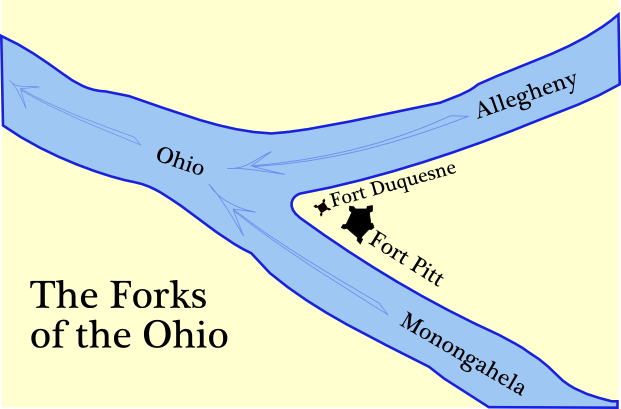
Location of Fort Pitt, Pennsylvania

Colonel Daniel Brodhead, of the 8th Pennsylvania Regiment, had been assigned to operate out of Fort Pitt, now Pittsburgh, Pennsylvania and Captain Samuel Brady was serving under his command there, which is where news of his father's death reached him. In the anguish of that moment, he raised his hand and vowed, "Aided by Him who formed yonder sun and heaven, I will avenge the murder of my father, nor while I live will I ever be at peace with the Indians of any tribe." For better or worse, he made good on that vow.

=== Ordeal of his widowed mother Mary ===
After her husband, Captain John Brady died, in 1779, newly widowed Mary Quigley Brady left his grave and the adjoining graves of her four deceased children. She took her surviving and still at home children to the home of her parents, James and Jeanette Quigley in Cumberland County, Pennsylvania. She sheltered there from May until October. However, in October she felt the call to return to her frontier home. She set out for her return to Fort Brady with her family. Her brother Robert Quigley gave her a cow, which she led over the hills to Fort Brady. She carried fourteen-month-old Liberty on horseback for this journey. As Belle Swope described it, "Many men would shrink from such a perilous undertaking in those days of bloodshed, knowing not in what bushes might be hiding an Indian who hungered for a scalp to add to his trophies; but her duty to her children led her through all the dangers, and her cheerful courage never flinched, and with her manly sons and helpful daughters took up the burden of life again in her own home." The winter of 1779-1780 was particularly hard. Deep snowdrifts made contact with even near neighbors difficult. In the spring, several neighbors were killed by the Indians, requiring most of the women in the area to spend their days at Fort Muncy, so they would not be left through the day in isolated cabins unprotected while their husbands worked their fields. However, widow Brady insisted on sharing the danger with her sons. She went with them to prepare their meals and share their danger. "Many a day the son Hugh walked by the side of his brother John, carrying a rifle in one hand and a forked stick to clear the plow shear, in the other, while John plowed."

=== Vengeful Indian Fighter ===
Captain Samuel Brady (the Vengeful Indian Fighter) spent the rest of the Revolution defending settlers on the Pennsylvania frontier, where he gained near legendary status as an Indian fighter and a spy on Indian activities in areas few whites would dare tread. Brady first operated out of Fort Pitt (Pittsburgh). However, later he was stationed for the rest of the war at Fort McIntosh, Pennsylvania, which was a wooden stockade, perched at the confluence of the Ohio River and the Beaver River at the location of what is now Beaver, Pennsylvania. Fort McIntosh was on the very leading edge of the frontier. It was some thirty miles down river from Fort Pitt and about fifteen miles (24 km) east of where the Ohio River crosses into present day Ohio.

While Captain Brady's exploits were many, what he did is well illustrated by this episode. In June 1779, soon after learning of his father's death, Indians attacked a family near Fort Pitt and killed a settler mother and her four children, taking a boy and his sister as captives. When Captain Brady learned of their captivity, he rushed out with an Indian guide to rescue them. The Indians were apparently both Seneca and Munsee, led by a Munsee chief. The Indian party eventually camped by a creek, unaware that a vengeful Captain Brady was on their trail. This area was close to Brady's Bend, Pennsylvania on the Allegheny River in what was then the Seneca territory. Captain Brady and his guide came upon their fire in the dark. His guide said, "They will sleep by that fire tonight." "Yes," replied Captain Brady, "and I will awake them in a voice of thunder in the morning." In the morning, Captain Brady, "saw an old chief rise and stir the fire. Instantly a shot rang out, and he fell into the flame, and in the encounter which followed eight warriors were relieved of their scalps. The children were rescued, and the boy asked for the Captain's tomahawk, which he used in cutting off the head of the chief who fell into the fire saying, 'It was he who scalped my mother.'"

The rescue of these children from this party of Indians likely occurred and just as likely is the incident that gave rise to what one author calls the "pretty romance" about Captain Samuel Brady's encounters with a chief named Bald Eagle. Some writers claimed that a Munsee Delaware chief named Bald Eagle led war parties from Bald Eagle's Nest (now Milesburg, Pennsylvania) against white settlements in the West Branch Valley of the Susquehanna. According to these stories, Samuel's brother James Brady was delirious for the first four days after he arrived mortally wounded at his mother's home. However, on the fifth day, he became lucid and was able to describe the attack in detail. He said the attackers were Seneca and they were led by a Chief Cornplanter and by a Chief Bald Eagle. So, there were many stories saying that Bald Eagle had killed Samuel's brother, James Brady, near Williamsport in August 1778. Samuel Brady is said to have finally gotten his revenge on Bald Eagle by killing him near Brady's Bend, Armstrong County, Pennsylvania, in June 1779. However, the History of Lycoming County Pennsylvania, edited by John F. Meginness and published in 1892, states that Bald Eagle was already dead at the time of the Indian attack on James Brady. Therefore, it is disputed both that Bald Eagle led the attack that mortally wounded James Brady and that Samuel Brady killed Bald Eagle in revenge. Seeming to confirm that Bald Eagle and Captain Brady never crossed paths, Belle Swope describes Samuel Brady's many encounters with the Indians in meticulous detail and never once mentions Bald Eagle. On the other hand, there is an historical marker on Pennsylvania Route 68 at Brady's Bend, Pennsylvania commemorating this disputed event which reads, "Named for Capt. Samuel Brady, famed Indian scout and hero of many legends of western Pennsylvania. Near here, in 1779, he defeated a band of Senecas and Munsees, and killed Chief Bald Eagle."

== Brady's Leap ==
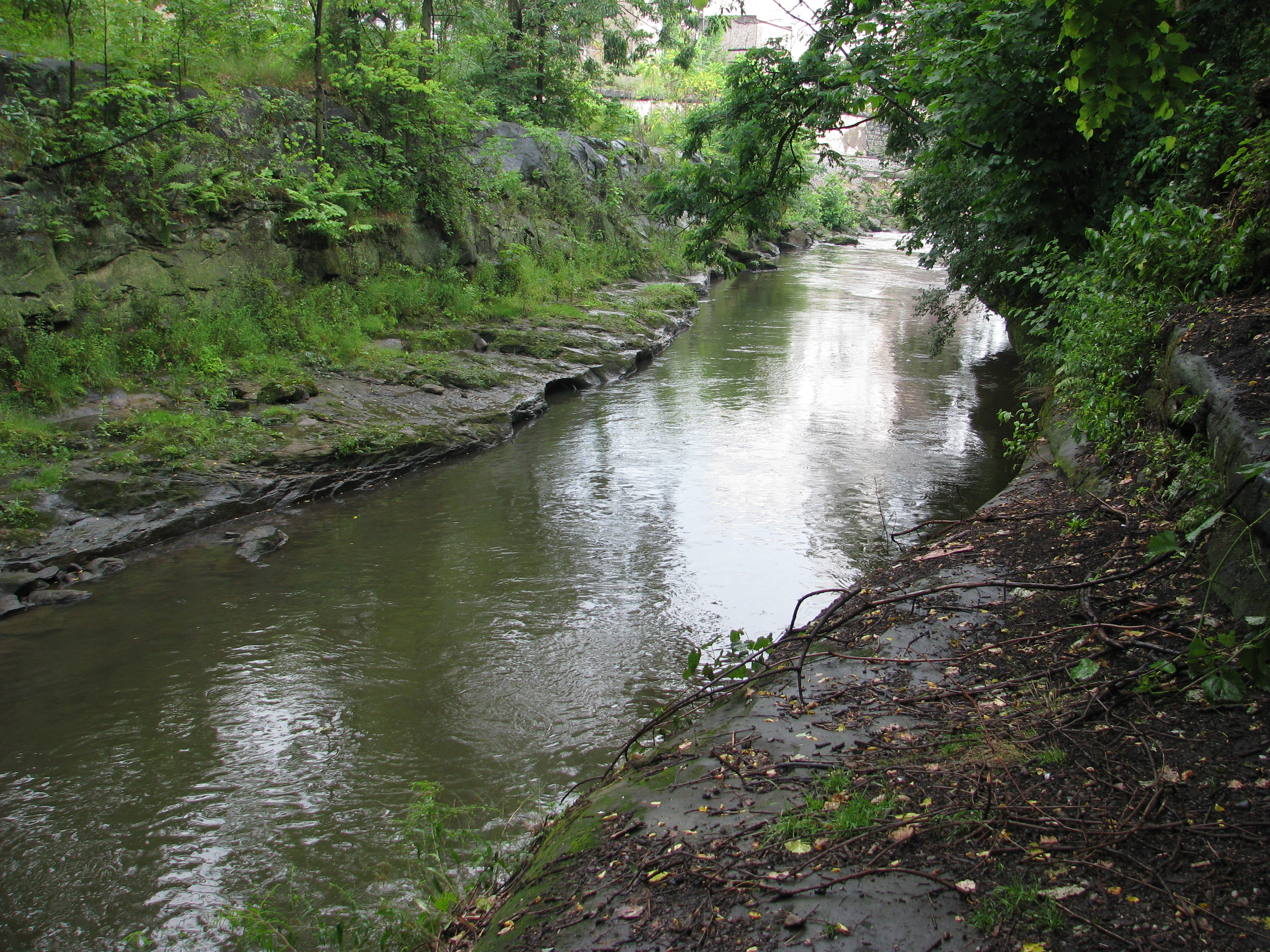
Place of Brady's Leap, Kent, Ohio

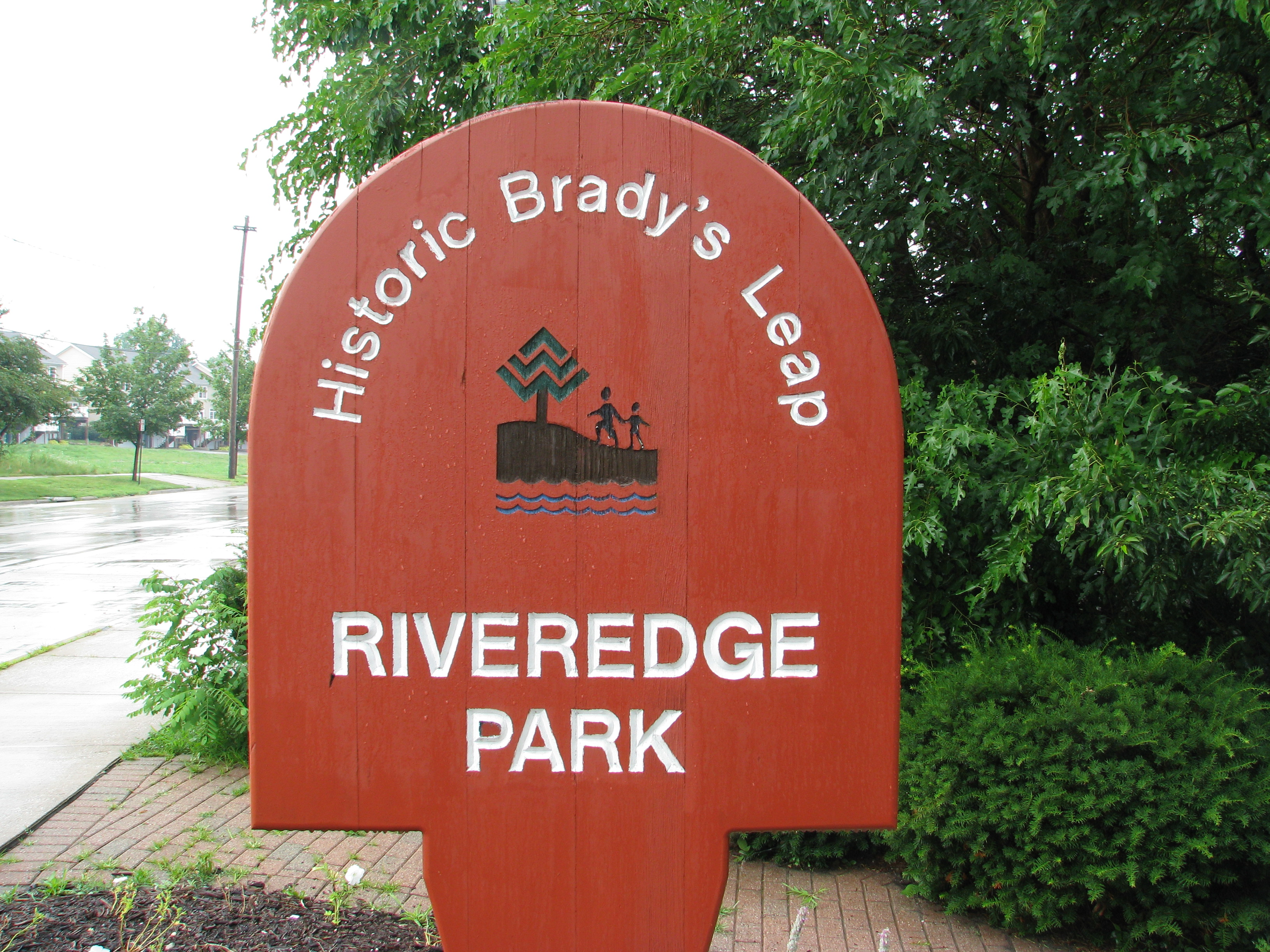
Entrance to Brady's Leap Park, Kent, Ohio

Samuel Brady gained his lasting notoriety for his leap over the Cuyahoga River around 1780 in what is now Kent, Ohio. After following a band of Indians into the Ohio country, a failed ambush attempt resulted in the band chasing Brady near the Cuyahoga River. To avoid capture, Brady leaped across a 22-foot (6.7 m) wide gorge of the river (which was widened considerably in the 1830s for construction of the Pennsylvania and Ohio Canal) and fled to a nearby lake where he hid in the water under a fallen tree using a reed for air. The lake, originally known as "Brady's Lake", is now known as Brady Lake and is the location of a former village of the same name, Brady Lake, Ohio, which celebrated "Captain Brady Day" each summer from 1972 to 2006. The site of Brady's leap is today a park known as "Brady's Leap Park" just north of downtown Kent, Ohio. Captain Samuel Brady and his Rangers were in pursuit of a band of Sandusky Indians, in what is now the State of Ohio. He and his Rangers ambushed them close to what is now Brady's Lake, killing most of them. However, a larger force of Indians arrived on the scene when the fight was at its height. After a long battle, Captain Brady's Rangers were overwhelmed. Some of his men managed to hide and escape death or capture, but most were killed and, of course, scalped. The Indians took Captain Brady prisoner. They did not kill him outright, because they wanted to make the death of their arch enemy an event. They notified other Indian tribes in the area that a "general jubilee of rejoicing" was to be held.

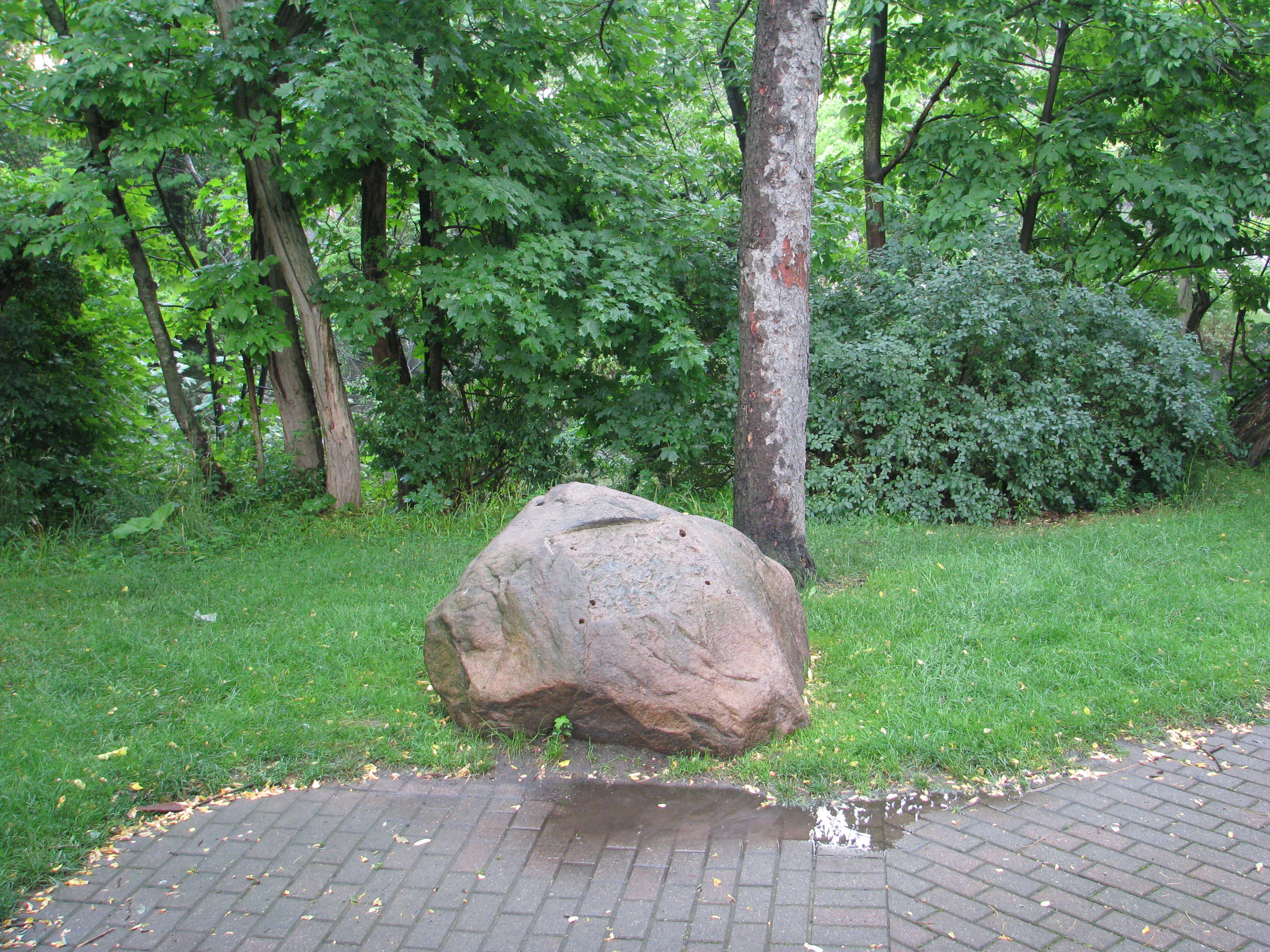
Stone marking spot where Brady's Leap began

When "the great day dawned and from far and near the chiefs with their tribes assembled, to see the most frightful tortures inflicted on their enemy. The fires were lighted around him but burned low, as he was bound to a stake, while different bodies of savages came riding in on their ponies. To add to his torture too, the flames were kept in check, and his suffering would have been very severe, had the Indians not made such confusion during the arrival of their friends, that the guard was not vigilant, and he cautiously pulled at the withes which bound his wrists, and slowly, surely they broke beneath the strain. Some accounts claim that the heat enabled him to break his bonds, but it was probably due to his wonderful physical strength. Stripped of his clothing, he dashed madly across the flame of fire, according to one writer, seized a squaw, the wife of a noted chief, according to other historians her child, threw her into the fire, and in the attendant turmoil caused by his desperate deed, he made good his escape."

Even having escaped the stake, Captain Brady's situation was obviously dire. He was naked and without weapons. He had nothing to eat and there were "hundreds of Indians wildly following with resolute persistence". The chase went through "a hundred miles of woods" and lasted quite a while. He grabbed berries to eat and had to dig roots to eat, which he washed in the streams he had to splash through.

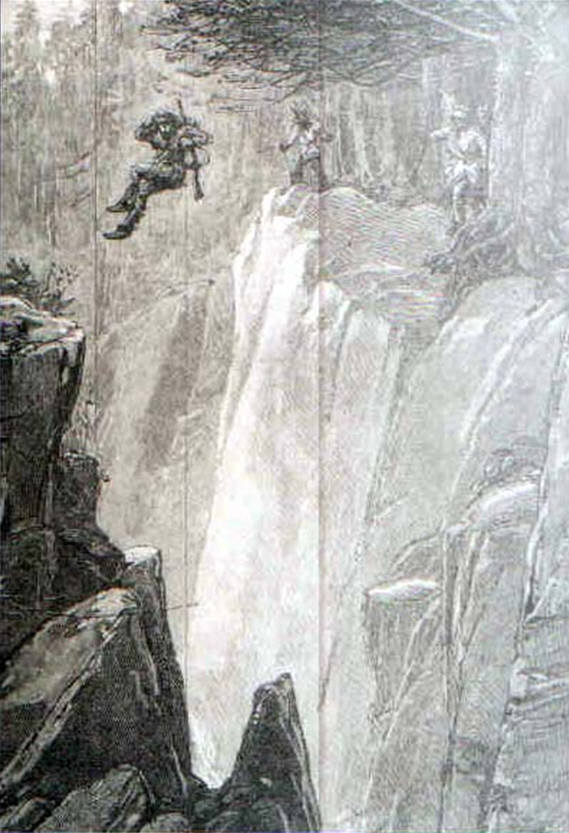
Brady's Leap

Finally, his flight brought him to the Cuyahoga River, within the corporate limits of present-day Kent, in Portage County, Ohio. At that point, Belle Swope reports:

He made his way to Standing Rock, and intended to cross at that ford, but the Indians were awaiting him, and he ran farther along the bank, to a place where the rocks rose at some points to a height of twenty-five feet. The body of the river at the narrowest part was from twenty-three to thirty feet wide, and was deep and dangerous. There was no other ford than Standing Rock for miles, and the Indians felt assured of their prize, but faint heart was not known to the Captain of the Rangers, and even a rushing torrent of water did not stop him in his course. Gaining a less precipitous edge of the cliff, he ran back into the forest, to get a good start, and was so near the approaching red men, that he heard their shots and exclamations. Across the expanse of water, at a height of probably twenty or twenty-five feet, he bounded, and with the eye of a practiced marksman, struck the bank on the other side, and stood on the cliff, as the wild yell and wilder appearance of the first pursuer denoted his disappointment and rage. He gave way to his wrath in his desperate utterance of sadness, 'Brady made damn good jump. Indian no try.'

—

Somehow, in this frantic escape and headlong flight, Captain Brady ended up with a leg wound. One report has it that the Indians managed to shoot him in the leg after he made his jump, but did not finish him off, because they still wanted to capture him alive to torture him before they killed him. In any event, the Indians crossed the Cuyahoga at a ford. They followed the blood trail dripping from his leg wound and actually caught up to a place that was close to where he had made it. Despite his renowned strength near exhaustion, he slipped into present day Brady Lake, where he hid underwater among the lilies and breathed through a hollow reed. The Indians gathered around the lake, where they waited and listened. In the end, they decided he had drowned. They gave up and returned to their camp. Captain Brady emerged from the lake and was able to make it back to Fort McIntosh, a lot worse for wear, but alive to fight another day.

=== Spy on the Indians ===
One of Captain Samuel Brady's responsibilities was to gather intelligence on the Indians. Without doubt, his aptitude for this task was extraordinary. On one of these spying missions in the year 1780, Captain Samuel Brady made his way, disguised as an Indian, through the Ohio country wilderness to the "Sandusky Indian towns", to gather intelligence for the army as to the current Indian situation. During this trip, he drew a map of that part of the wilderness and marked on his map where the Indian towns were located. He slipped so close to their "principal town" that he availed the opportunity to capture two horses and two Indian women. He mounted the Indian women on the horses and led them away. However, as he approached the Ohio River, one of the Indian women managed to slip off her horse unnoticed and flee into the woods. When Samuel noticed she was gone, he hopped on her horse and rode after her through the woods, leading the other woman mounted on the other horse. This chase went on for some time. He never did catch up to the escaped Indian woman, because he ran into a distraction—the chance rescue of the captive settler woman, Jenny Stupes and her two children. Here is how Belle Swope said he did it.

[Samuel Brady] was compelled to keep such a sharp lookout for Indian trails, that he was not surprised to meet a warrior on horseback, with a woman in front of him on the saddle, and two children running beside them. After studying the face of the woman for a moment, he found her to be Jenny Stupes, wife of a frontiersman, and determined to save her. By a marvelous accuracy, he shot the Indian dead, without inflicting a single injury to the woman. He rolled from the horse, leaving her bewildered. Captain Samuel Brady was in disguise, and rushed toward her, in his painted countenance the wild gleam of savagery, in his hand a scalping knife. Supposing him to be what his disguise indicated, she said, "Why did you kill your brother?" "Why, Jenny, don't you know me? I am Sam Brady", said the captain, and with her children and his prisoner, he started for the nearest settlement. Jenny Stupes had a little dog, which followed her, and by means of which the Indians who belonged to the party that captured her, could trail her and her rescuer. After the load fired into the Indian's body, but three were left for his rifle. He did not want to lose one by killing the dog, yet it had to be killed or the little band of fugitives might be found. Finally the dog came near, and he used his tomahawk in putting it out of the way. At last. Fort Pitt was reached, and Jenny, her two children, and the captured squaw, landed in safety within its walls.

Many years later, Jenny Stupes was able to contribute in a major way to the rescue of Captain Samuel Brady.

Belle Swope continues that the situation was especially dire for the settlers on the Pennsylvania frontier in the "bloody year" of 1782. Word reached the settlers that the hostile Indian alliance was planning a raid in force on their settlements. General George Washington ordered Fort Pitt's commander, General Brodhead to dispatch his two best scouts to go deep into Indian territory to spy on the actions of the Indians. General Brodhead quickly picked Captain Brady and allowed him to pick his companion. "He said he would take but one, a Lewis Wetzel." According to Belle, Brady and Wetzel disguised themselves as Shawnees and, as such, went to the grand council of the Indian alliance, located at present day Sandusky, Ohio on Lake Erie. They stated that they were eager to join the forces that were to soon move on the white settlers. The ruse worked for a while. The Indians accepted them as Shawnees and allowed them to attend their council meetings, where the details of their upcoming attack plans were freely discussed. In this way, they learned considerable intelligence about the intentions of the Indians. In time, however, one old Indian chief started to become suspicious, which Brady and Wetzel noticed. When the old chief started toward them, Samuel Brady immediately shot him dead. There followed a shootout, in which Wetzel shot and killed another chief.

They gained the outskirts of the camp, where they sprang on two fine Kentucky horses, which had been captured. On and on they rode like two winged demons, their war paint and feathers weirdly hideous in the cold March daylight. One horse gave out, but the two men undaunted lost not a moment, one riding, the other running. They came to the wigwams of some friendly Delawares, just as their second horse fell beneath his rider. Securing another, they took turns, one riding, the other running as before.

At intervals they stopped and shot a pursuer, always keeping, a distance of many yards. When they reached the Ohio river, they plunged with their horse into the icy torrent. Captain Samuel Brady clung to its back, while Wetzel hung to its tail and struggling and swimming they gained the other side, leaving the Indians to give up the chase. It was intensely cold. Their

clothes were frozen, long icicles hanging from them, and almost perished, they attempted to build a fire. Wetzel was scarcely alive, and to save him, the Captain killed their horse, disemboweled it, and put his comrade into the animal, to keep him warm, while he lit the fire. When he had made a raging heat, he took Wetzel from the horse's body and rubbed him until he was warm. It was a hairbreadth escape, and the plan of the Indians was exposed to the government, and both scouts were commended for their courage and the manner in which they gained the information. The Indian conspiracy was broken in twain, and the dashing young Captain of the Rangers was more than ever beloved by the women and children as their protector, and respected by the men, to whom he was the embodiment of physical manhood.

—

== After the Revolution ==
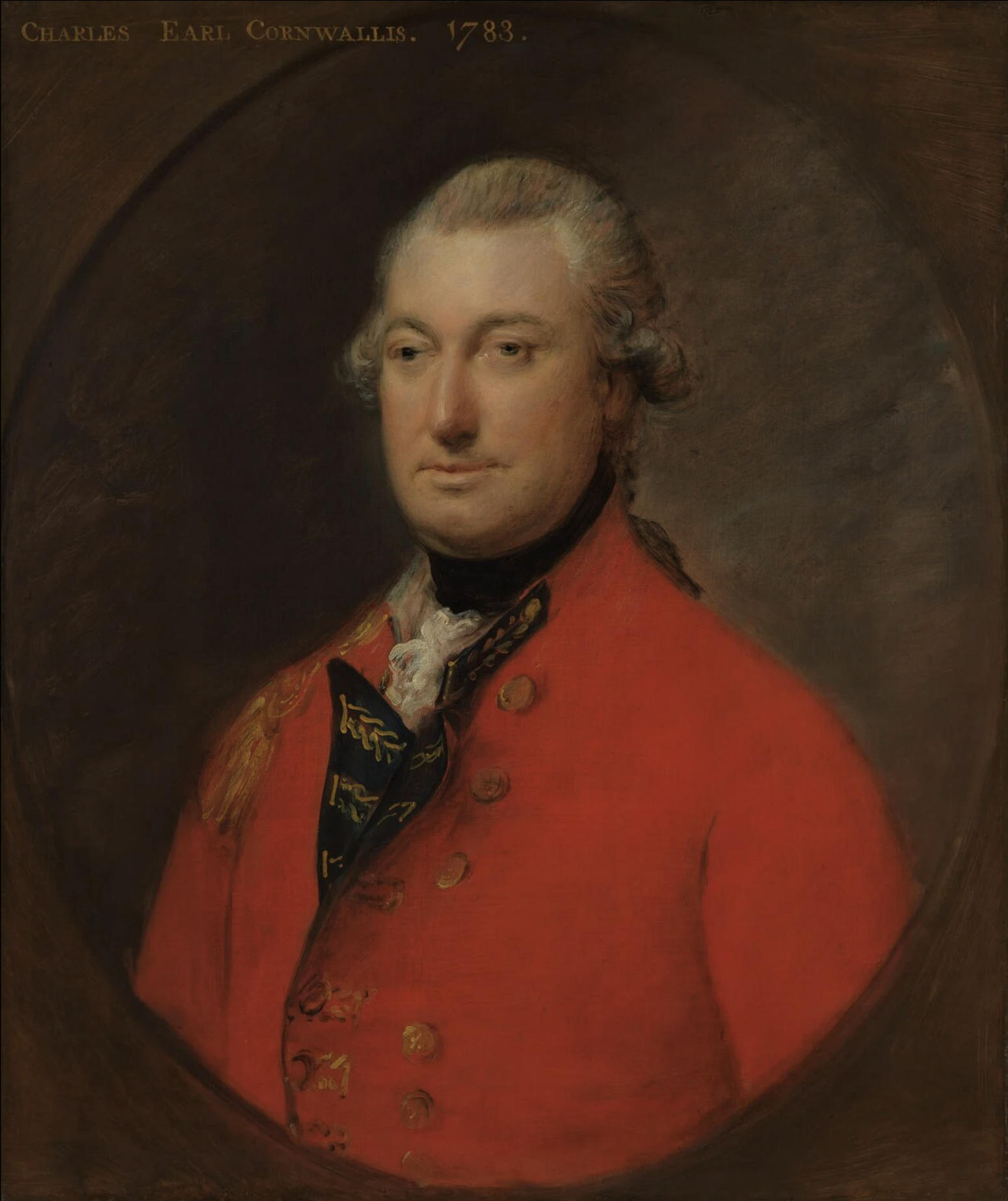
General Lord Charles Cornwallis

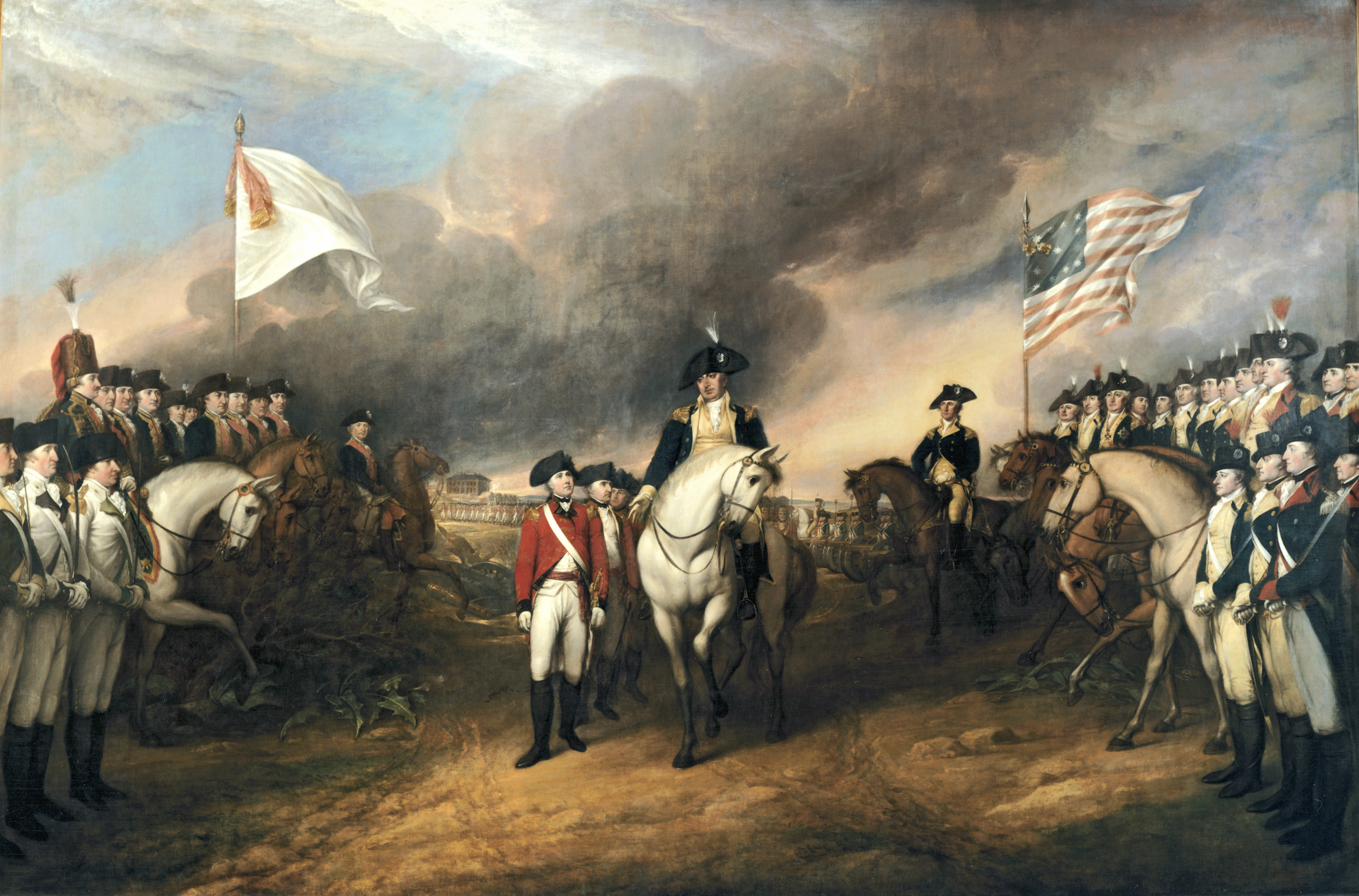
General Cornwallis' Surrender at Yorktown

The American Revolution ended when Captain Samuel Brady was 27. America effectively won its war with Britain when British General Lord Charles Cornwallis surrendered unconditionally to the besieging armies of General George Washington and his ally, the French on October 17, 1781, at Yorktown, Virginia, with the British drummers beating out the strangely appropriate march, "The Day the World Turned Upside Down" for the occasion. The war officially ended with the Treaty of Paris, which was signed on September 3, 1783, and which the American Congress of the Confederation approved on January 14, 1784.

=== Death of Samuel's mother Mary ===
Captain Samuel Brady's mother, Mary Quigley Brady died on October 20, 1783, near Lewisburg, Pennsylvania at the age of forty-eight years. She suffered a long illness before her early death, the result of the many hardships and tragedies of her chosen frontier life. However, she did live to see American Independence won and the Indians driven far from the environs of her home. Some of her children were still not grown when she died, but her older children still at home learned to look after the younger both during her lengthy illness and after her death.

Samuel Brady's sister Mary was the fifth child of Captain John Brady and Mary Quigley Brady. She was their oldest daughter and did the most to care for her younger brothers and sisters, both before and after the deaths of her parents. When her father, John was killed, "she gave to her mother the tender ministrations of a strong, affectionate character." On September 10, 1784, about a year after the death of her mother, Mary married Captain William Gray and moved to Sunbury, Pennsylvania. The newlyweds took with them all of Mary's younger brothers and sisters, except Hugh Brady, to share their new home. These children lived with them until they themselves married. Mary's brother Hugh Brady, who was eventually to become a general, went to live with his older brother Captain Samuel Brady living at that time in Washington County, Pennsylvania. Hugh lived with Samuel until he received a commission as an ensign in the army of General Anthony Wayne in 1792.

=== Marriage to Drusilla Swearingen ===
Samuel Brady met his wife Drusilla Swearingen, the daughter of his commanding officer, at Holliday's Cove Fort (the present downtown Weirton, West Virginia) located along the Ohio River midway between Ft. Pitt at the great confluence and south to Ft. Henry in Wheeling. They were married in 1783. Hollidays Cove Fort was a Revolutionary War fortification constructed in 1774 by soldiers from Ft. Pitt. It was located in what is now downtown Weirton, along Harmons Creek (named for Harmon Greathouse), about three miles from its mouth on the Ohio River. It was commanded by Captain Van Swearingen (1743–1793) and later by his son-in-law, Captain Samuel Brady (1756–1795), the famous leader of Brady's Rangers. In 1779, over 28 militia were garrisoned at Hollidays Cove. Two years earlier, Colonel Van Swearingen led a dozen soldiers by longboat down the Ohio to help rescue the inhabitants of Ft. Henry in Wheeling in a siege by the British and Indian tribes in 1777. That mission was memorialized in a WPA-era mural painted on the wall of the Cove Post Office by Charles S. Chapman (1879–1962). The mural features Col. John Bilderback, who later gained infamy as the leader of the massacre of the Moravian Indians in Gnadenhutten in 1782. In a letter dated July 1, 1779, Col. Daniel Brohead wrote to the commander of Ft. Pitt that "Captain Brady and John Montour have gone with a party to capture Simon Girty, who is reportedly lurking with seven Mingo Indians near Holliday's Cove." [Source: Every Home a Fort, Every Man a Warrior, Michael Edward Nogay (Tri-State Publishing, 2009, 128 pp.) ISBN 978-0-57801862-1].

Captain Samuel Brady married Drusilla Swearingen in about 1785 in Pennsylvania. Drusilla was born in 1769 probably in Wellsburg, Brooke County, Virginia (now West Virginia). Drusilla was the daughter of Captain Van "Indian" Swearingen and Eleanor Virgin. Samuel's father-in-law to be, Captain Van "Indian" Swearingen lived on a "plantation" in what was then Strabane Township of Washington County, Pennsylvania in present-day Beaver County. The illustrious Captain Samuel Brady was more than welcome in his home. However, Samuel met Van's daughter Drusilla Swearingen during these visits and they fell in love. Van had sent Drusill for an education "out East" and had in mind for her a husband more refined than the rough hewn, Captain Brady. In fact, he had some actual prospects in mind. So, Van objected to their relationship. Never one to take "no" for an answer, Samuel rode up to the Swearingen home one evening with an extra horse. Drusilla hopped on and they eloped to a "private wedding" in Washington County. Van, out of necessity, forgave them. He even "planned a formal Episcopal wedding with his blessing, and built a home for them on his plantation." Samuel and Drusilla lived in Chartiers Creek, Pennsylvania, Washington County, Pennsylvania.

They moved to what is now Ohio County, West Virginia, where they settled near Wellsburg. In 1793 they moved to Short Creek, which is about two miles (3.2 km) west of West Liberty, (now) West Virginia, where they lived until Samuel died. Samuel and Drusilla had three children, William Brady born about 1785 in Wellsville, (now) West Virginia, Van Swearingen Brady born September 13, 1786, in Chartiers Creek, Washington County, Pennsylvania and John Brady born May 24, 1790, near Wellsburg, (now) West Virginia.

=== Murder trial for killing Native Americans ===
Samuel Brady's thirst for revenge did not end with the Armistice. Samuel Brady was charged with killing Indians after the war was over, tried for that crime in Pittsburgh in a "bar" and a jury of his frontier peers acquitted him, even after he defiantly admitted in open court that he had done it.

Samuel Brady, in March 1791, hid in a thicket in Fallston, Pennsylvania, subsequently ambushing Delaware Indians at the New Brighton Trading Post, among them being nonresistant Christian Munsee who belonged to the Moravian Church. The victims included four Delaware Indian men and one Delware Indian woman; local Anglo-American men from the town stated that the reason Brady attacked the Delaware Indians was to plunder them for their horses and firearms.

Several years after the Revolution, Captain Brady led twenty five armed Virginia Rangers in "hot pursuit" of twelve Delaware Indians who they said had been raiding white settlements in what was then Virginia and is now West Virginia. On March 9, 1791, they crossed Brady's Run and the Beaver River into the newly established state of Pennsylvania. They caught up with the Indians, who they thought had been conducting the raids, at the Big Beaver Blockhouse where those Indians were trading. They killed four Delaware men and one Delaware woman. After the raid, they crossed back over the border to their homes in Virginia. The owner of the Red Front Trading Post, William Wilson and his friend John Hillman accused Brady and his Rangers of "plundering". Pennsylvania issued a warrant for Samuel's arrest.

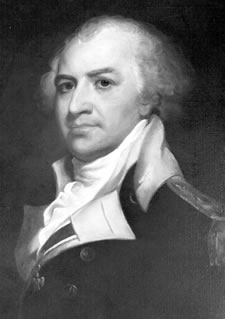
Pennsylvania Governor Thomas Mifflin

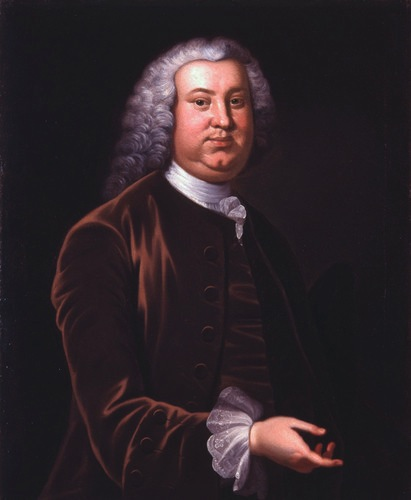
Virginia Governor Peyton Randolph

Pennsylvania Governor Thomas Mifflin demanded Samuel's extradition from Virginia Governor Peyton Randolph. There were a lot of documents that passed back and forth between the two new states, but Virginia did not give him up. Pennsylvania offered rewards of $300 and $1000 for his capture, to no avail. Two bounty hunters did try, but failed. These bounty hunters lost their guns in a West Virginia tavern where Brady claimed them as "souvenirs". This is how Belle Swope described that incident. "He was sitting in a tavern in West Virginia, when two Virginians rode up, and told the keeper they wanted horse feed and dinner. He was rolling his rifle on his knees, and they laid their pistols on a table near, while they conversed with the landlord. He told them the young Captain was popular and lived in that region. They promised him part of the reward if he would assist in his capture. The landlord said it was useless as no one could take Sam Brady alive. They vowed they could. The man opposite said, "I am Sam Brady". They looked at him, measured his strength, and gave up the attempt. After dinner they turned to the table to take up their pistols, but the Captain of the Rangers said "no", and not even the landlord persuaded him to change his mind. He afterward presented them to his sons."

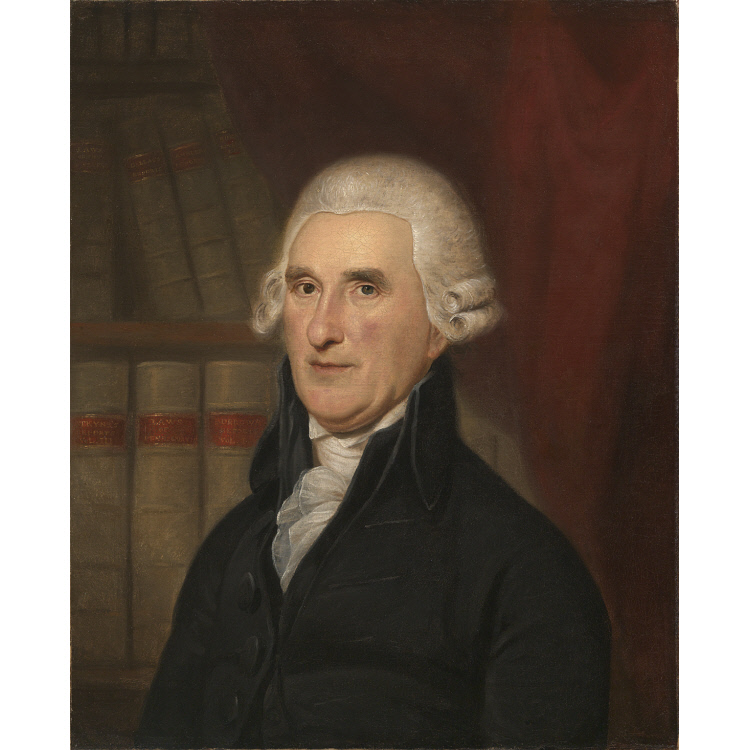
Pennsylvania Chief Justice Thomas McKean

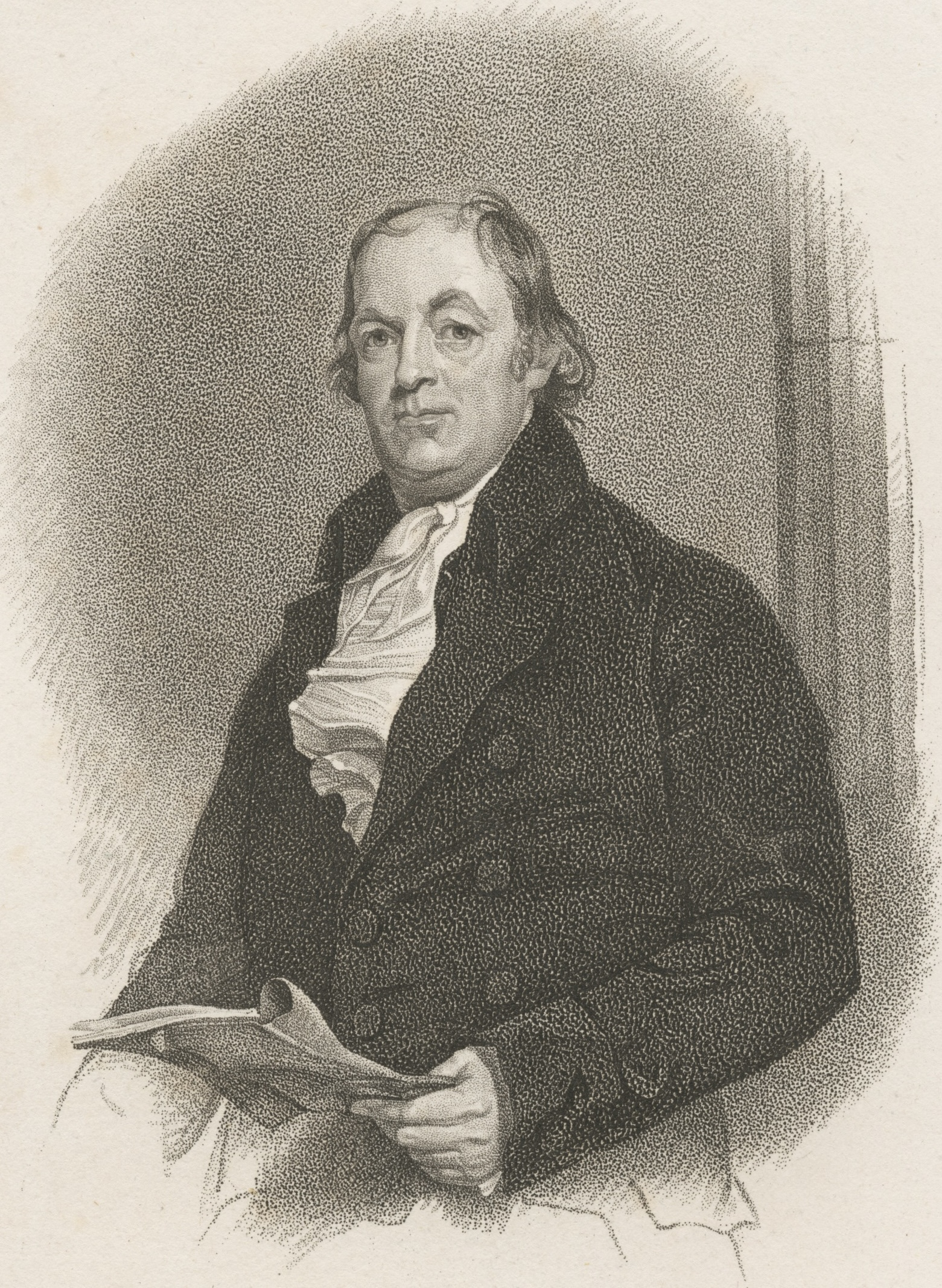
Defense Attorney James Ross

Samuel's old commander, General Anthony Wayne wanted "his long time friend" Samuel Brady to be his chief scout in an upcoming Indian campaign. So, he and Samuel's father in law, Van "Indian" Swearingen of Wellsburg, along with many of Samuel's friends, convinced Samuel to surrender himself for trial in Pittsburgh, so the matter would no longer be hanging over his head. The case was much celebrated at the time and became one of the earliest court trials in Pittsburgh. The Judge came by stage coach (complete with wig) all the way from Philadelphia to preside at the trial. Pennsylvania Chief Justice Thomas McKean (a Quaker) went along with the trial judge and actually sat on the bench next to him. The jurors were all male and all settlers. At this trial, Samuel was defended by the politician James Ross. Present and going way out of her way to be conspicuous in the "court room" (apparently a bar) was the compelling presence of Jennie Stupes. Brady had heroically rescued her and her son from Indians thirteen years earlier and the jury members knew it full well. To make sure no juror missed her presence, she walked up to where Samuel was seated and placed a flask of brandy on the table in front of him and a pitcher of water on top of that "for his personal refreshment".

Samuel Brady had an Indian friend named Guyasuta, who testified as a defense witness. He stated that the Indians "rode white men's horses and were not friendly." At one point in the trial, Belle Swope reports, "At the trial at Pittsburgh, he laid the scalps on the bar, and said, 'There they are, I killed them.'" Belle, continues, "Women and men were there to fight for him if necessary, but their services were not needed." The "backwoods jury" never left their seats but said "not guilty but pay the costs".

=== Service under Wayne ===
In the 1790s George Washington decided to press to make United States land claims beyond the Appalachian mountains a reality. To do this he organized the "Legion of the United States". He called his Revolutionary War comrade, Anthony Wayne from retirement and gave him command of this army. Wayne recruited, organized and trained this army at Legionville, Pennsylvania on the Ohio River down river from Pittsburgh. Wayne had been Samuel Brady's commander during the American Revolutionary War. He had been actively trying to recruit Brady to lead the army's spies. When the jury cleared Brasy of the charges of killing Native Americans, Wayne restored Brady's rank of captain in his new army and gave him command of "all the spies in the employ of the government at that time. [Brady] ordered his sixty or seventy men so judiciously, that the frontier was free from depredations."

=== Death ===
Brady died of pleurisy on December 25, 1795, in Short Creek, Virginia, about 2 miles (3.2 km) west of West Liberty, Virginia. About his death, Belle Swope says, "His life in years was short, in deeds beyond the reckoning of man. No man was a better fighter. No undertaking was too great for him, nor peril too blinding. Captain Samuel Brady of the Rangers was as tender as a woman, and few men have been as sincerely beloved, and as deeply mourned when death claimed him." His wife, Lucy Brady died on January 9, 1823.
