= Noah Zane =

American politician

Member of the Virginia Senate from Monongalia, Ohio, Harrison, Randolph, Wood and Brook Counties
- In office November 30, 1812 – November 10, 1816
- Preceded by: James Pindall
- Succeeded by: George J. Davisson

Personal details
- Born: October 23, 1778 Wheeling, Ohio County, Virginia
- Died: June 3, 1833 (aged 54) Wheeling, Ohio County, Virginia, U.S.
- Parent(s): Bbenezer Zane, Elizabeth McCulloch

Noah Ebenezer Zane (October 23, 1778 – June 3, 1833) was an American pioneer and politician. Born near Fort Henry (which became Wheeling in his lifetime and is now in West Virginia), he represented several western Virginia counties in the Virginia Senate during the War of 1812.

== Early and family life ==
Noah Zane was one of eleven children born to pioneer Ebenezer Zane (who served several terms in the Virginia House of Delegates) and his wife Elizabeth McColloch or McCullough (October 30, 1748 – 1814). As an infant, Noah and his sisters survived the siege in September 1782, as his father, Zane uncles, aunt Betty Zane and uncles Major Samuel McCulloch and Major John McCulloch fought Native Americans seeking to expel the settlers. His brothers Daniel (1788-1860) and Samuel (1784-1854) also outlived their parents, as did several sisters.

In 1806 he married Mary Chapline (1787-1858), the daughter of Moses Chapline and Mary Caldwell, thus descended from two other important pioneer families in the area. Their only son to survive childhood, Platoff Zane (1815-1846) did not survive his parents, although he did have three sons and two daughters. Noah Zane's four daughters married and survived the American Civil War.

== Career ==
Noah Zane farmed on both sides of the Ohio River near Wheeling (not using enslaved labor in the State of Ohio, since such was illegal), as well as administered the estates of his parents. He owned three enslaved people in 1810, and in 1820 owned seven slaves, with two free Black women also living in his household. In the final census of his lifetime, his household included four free Black women and one enslaved Black man (between 36 and 55 years of age), whereas his brother Daniel Zane who lived nearby still owned four enslaved Blacks.

In 1812, Ohio County voters, together with those in several nearby counties of northwestern Virginia (Monongalia, Harrison, Randolph, Wood and Brook Counties) elected Zane to the Virginia Senate, where he succeeded James Pindall and was in turn replaced by George J. Davisson in 1816.

== Death and legacy ==
Noah Zane died in November 1833, leaving his widow to raise their children and grandchildren. His grandsons would fight on opposite sides in the American Civil War. Edwin Greathouse Zane (1839-1863) fought with the 27th Virginia Infantry and died of wounds received at the Battle of Williamsport in the Gettysburg campaigns, though his brother Noah Zane (1843-1916) also in the 27th Virginia infantry survived the war, as did their eldest brother, Samuel Sprigg Zane (1837-1912), who joined the 11th West Virginia Infantry.
