= Elijah Woods (politician) =

American politician (1778–1820)

Member of the Ohio House of Representatives from the Belmont County district
- In office March 1, 1803 – December 4, 1803 Serving with Joseph Sharp
- Preceded by: none (new state)
- Succeeded by: Josiah Dillon; James Smith
- In office December 3, 1810 – December 1, 1811 Serving with Moses Moorehead; William Smith
- Preceded by: Joseph Sharp; Josiah Dillon; Isaac Dore
- Succeeded by: Joseph Sharp; Thomas Mitchell; James Smith

Personal details
- Born: 1778 Rockingham County, Virginia
- Died: November 23, 1820 (aged 41–42) Belmont County, Ohio
- Resting place: Walnut Grove Cemetery, Martins Ferry, Ohio
- Party: Democratic-Republican
- Spouse: Hetty Zane
- Children: six

Elijah Woods was a politician from Belmont County, Ohio who was a delegate to the convention that drafted the first constitution of the U.S. State of Ohio in 1802 and served in the Ohio House of Representatives soon after statehood.

== Biography ==
Elijah Woods was born in Rockingham County, Virginia in 1778. He travelled with his uncle Archibald Woods to the Ohio River Valley in 1798.

Woods worked for Ebenezer Zane at Fort Henry, now Wheeling, West Virginia, and acquired land in Belmont County Northwest Territory, where he settled. He had surveyed in Kentucky for a winter before coming to the Ohio Valley. When Belmont County was organized in September, 1801, he was named County Surveyor, and served as clerk of courts 1801–1806.

Woods was elected to the Convention to write a constitution for the proposed state of Ohio in 1802 as a Democratic-Republican who was “pledged to support statehood and the principles of Jefferson”. At the convention, he voted to oppose civil rights for black people.

Woods was elected to the Ohio House of Representatives in 1803 and 1810.

Woods was married to Ebenezer Zane's daughter, Hester “Hetty” Zane on May 15, 1803. They had six children.

Ebenezer Zane laid out Bridgeport, Ohio across the Ohio River from Wheeling. He deeded eight acres to Elijah and Hetty Woods in the town in 1806. Woods operated a ferry from Bridgeport to Wheeling Island and Zane operated the ferry from Wheeling to Wheeling Island. Woods built his home in Bridgeport near the ferry and operated an inn there.

Elijah Woods died on November 23, 1820, in Belmont County at the age of 42.
