= Ebenezer Zane =

American politician (1747–1811)

Member of the Virginia House of Delegates from Ohio County
- In office December 2, 1799 – 1800 Serving with Benjamin Biggs
- Preceded by: Archibald Woods
- Succeeded by: William McKinley
- In office May 5, 1783 – October 16, 1785 Serving with David Shepherd
- Preceded by: Andrew Robison
- Succeeded by: David Bradford
- In office May 1, 1780 – May 7, 1781 Serving with Samuel McCullouch
- Preceded by: Andrew Robison
- Succeeded by: n/a

Personal details
- Born: October 7, 1747 Moorefield, Virginia, British America
- Died: November 19, 1811 (aged 64) Wheeling, Ohio County, Virginia, U.S.

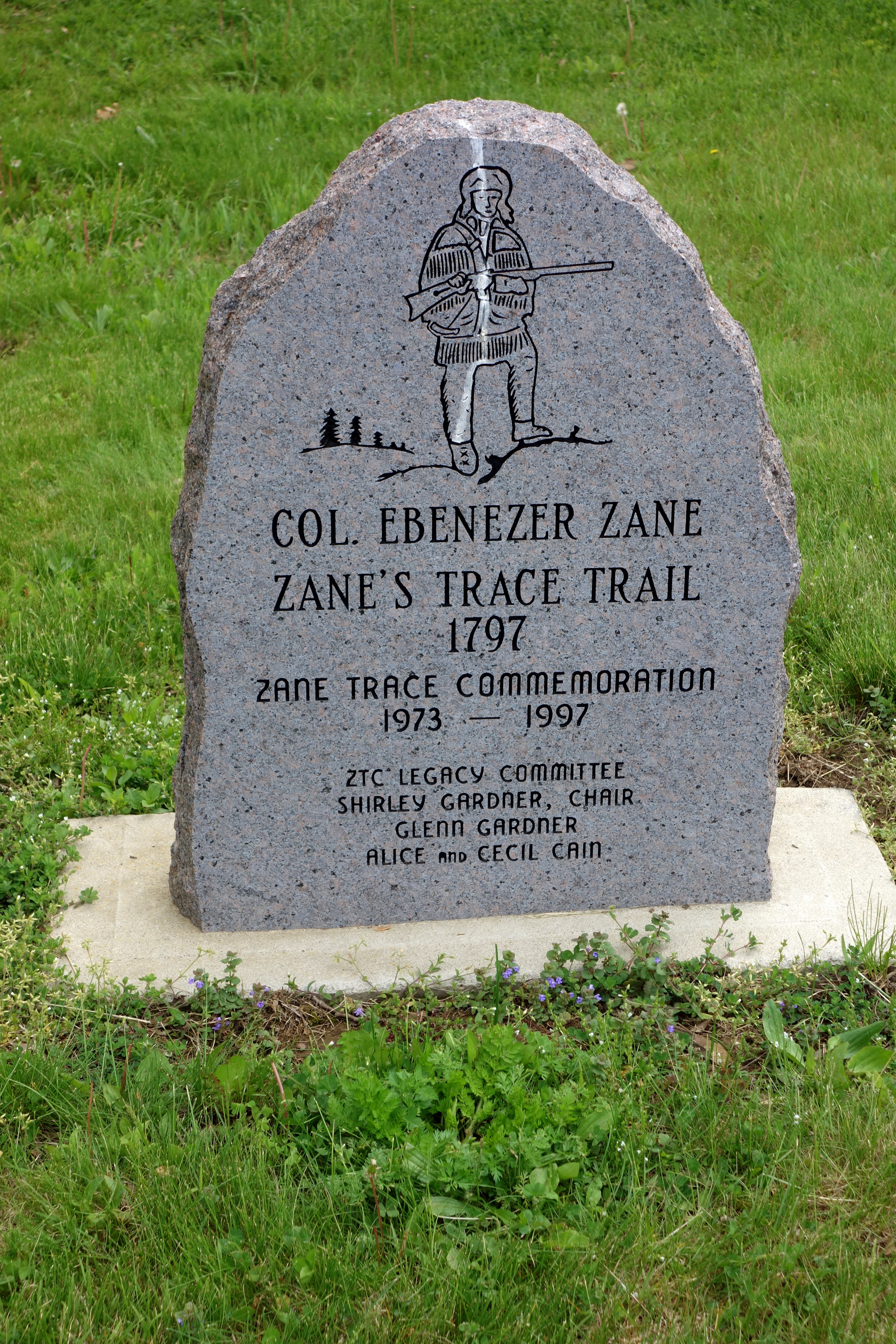
Ebenezer Zane was the namesake of Zane's Trace, commemorated on stone trail marker at National Road Museum in Norwich, Ohio.

Ebenezer Zane (October 7, 1747 – November 19, 1811) was an American pioneer, soldier, politician, road builder and land speculator. Born in the Colony of Virginia (possibly near what became Moorefield, West Virginia), Zane established a settlement near Fort Henry which became Wheeling (also in present-day West Virginia), on the Ohio River. He also blazed an early road through the Ohio Country to Limestone (now Maysville, Kentucky) known as Zane's Trace.

== Family ==
Zane was one of six children born to William Andrew Zane and his wife, Nancy Ann Nolan (died 1764), who married at a Quaker meeting in Philadelphia in 1744 and soon emigrated from New Jersey to then vast Augusta County, Virginia. His ancestor Robert Zane had helped William Penn found Philadelphia. Ebenezer had four brothers: Silas (1745-1785), Andrew (born 1749), Jonathan (born about 1750), and Isaac (1751-1816), as well as one sister, Elizabeth "Betty" (born 1759). His uncle Isaac had remained in Philadelphia, became a wealthy carpenter, and financed his son, also Isaac, to go to western Virginia and join his relatives. Complicating matters, native Americans captured William Zane and several of his young sons after they had begun to farm along the south branch of the Potomac River, and although some were eventually taken to Detroit and ransomed, his son Isaac remained a captive of the Wyandot for more than a decade, married a native American, and would have Zanesfield, Ohio, named in his honor.

Zane married Elizabeth McColloch or McCullough (October 30, 1748 – 1814). They had eleven children, although several died as infants. Their first child was daughter Catherine (1769-1851), who married Absalom Martin (a government surveyor of the Seven Ranges who founded Martins Ferry, Ohio, where Zane and several family members would be buried); Sarah (1773-1851) first married John McIntire (who helped his father-in-law create the Zane Trace discussed below, then founded Zanesville, Ohio, as well as helped write the first Ohio Constitution). Noah (who like his father and cousin would serve in the Virginia General Assembly) was born October 25, 1778, and died in Wheeling in 1833. Rebecca (1776-1866) married John Clarke and became the longest lived sibling. Hester or Esther (1786-1854) married prominent politician Elijah Woods, who also helped write the Ohio Constitution. Daniel (1788-1860) became the longest living son, with his brother Jesse (b. 1790) dying young, and outliving John (1780-1805) as well as Samuel (1784-1854). He was an ancestor of author Zane Grey, who was born in Zanesville.

== From Dunmore's War through the American Revolution ==
To the distress of many settlers in western Virginia, the British agreed in the 1763 treaty ending the conflict to prohibit further settlement west of the Appalachian divide. Despite the treaty ban, Zane and his brothers Silas and Jonathan headed west from Moorefield (on the south branch of the Potomac River east of the Appalachian divide) across the Appalachian Mountains to the Ohio River . At the conjunction of Wheeling Creek and the Ohio River, they began clearing land to farm, as well as established what later became Fort Henry in 1769. Initially, the fort constructed under the guidance of Major Angus McDonald to defend colonists against Native American raids was called "Fort Fincastle," reflecting another title of Virginia governor Lord Dunmore. In 1774, Zane began his formal military career under British rule, as a disbursing officer during Dunmore's War against Native Americans.

Zane later became a colonel in the Virginia militia and in 1776 renamed the fort after Patrick Henry, who as a Virginia legislator and governor defended the interests of western Virginians. During the American Revolutionary War, Zane's elder brother Capt. Silas Zane and his siblings defended Fort Henry against several Native American attacks. The first Siege of Fort Henry occurred in September 1777. Another thwarted attack occurred in the summer of 1782. However, the most serious was the siege in September 1782. His sister Elizabeth became celebrated for her courage in leaving the fort to retrieve a badly needed keg of gunpowder and sprinting back safely under a hail of gunfire.

Meanwhile, his nephew Isaac Zane Jr. (1766-1839), also emigrated from the Philadelphia area to Virginia and became a leading citizen of Frederick County, Virginia, despite his Quaker faith, in part because his iron foundry which employed about 150 people and helped supply the westward trade.

Both Isaac Zane Jr. and Ebenezer Zane became politically active, and represented the interests of northwestern Virginia in the Virginia Revolutionary Conventions and later in the Virginia House of Delegates. Ohio County voters also elected Ebenezer Zane several times as one of their representatives in the Virginia House of Delegates, but the district briefly changed into Yohogenia County (with different boundaries in 1781-1782). In 1788, Ohio County voters also elected Ebenezer Zane as one of their delegates to the Virginia Ratifying Convention, where he and voted in favor of ratification of the United States Constitution. However, the 1799 election was very close, and a court challenge unseated Zane and Benjamin Biggs in favor of one of the incumbents, William McKinley and John Morgan.

== Building Zane's Trace ==
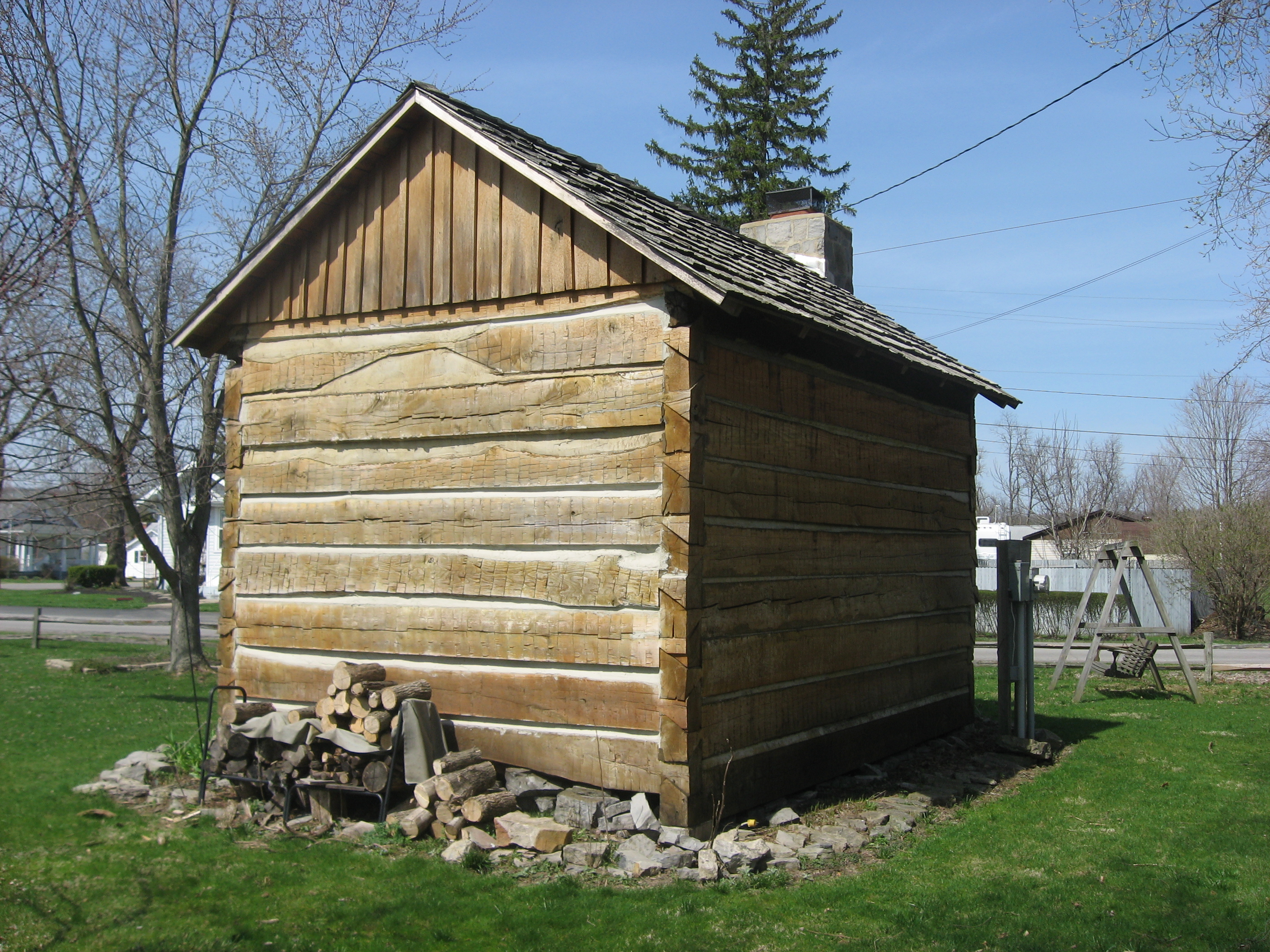
Ebeneezer [sic] Zane Cabin in Zanesfield

Following the war, in May 1796, Zane obtained permission and funds from the United States Congress to build a road through the Northwest Territory. In exchange for his work (and that of his brother Jonathan, son-in-law John McIntyre and native guide Tomepomehala), Congress granted Zane three large tracts of land—where the road crossed the Muskingum, Hocking, and Scioto rivers. His assistants would receive the land which became Zanesville, and the others became Lancaster and opposite Chillicothe.

When Zane's Trace was completed, it crossed what is now the state of Ohio from Wheeling, Virginia, to Maysville, Kentucky. Although the road was a rudimentary path and at first suitable only for travel by foot or horseback (not by wagon), the state of Ohio undertook improvements in the early 19th century. It was the only major road in Ohio until the War of 1812.

== Death and legacy ==
Zane died in November 1811, and was buried in Martin's Ferry, Ohio. Although Quakers by that time were forbidden to own slaves, Zane owned ten enslaved people in the 1810 census, and his will written the previous month gave his widow Elizabeth the choice of two slaves, among other provisions for her. Zane also divided his land in and near Wheeling (in Ohio County, Virginia, an Ohio River island and Belmont County, Ohio) among his sons Noah and Daniel, as well as finished his transfers to his son-in-law Jacob Burkett, and directed that his land in Fairfield County, Ohio, be sold and the proceeds held for the benefit of his daughters Rebecca Clark and Esther Woods, and with his son Samuel Zane receiving land in Wood County, Virginia, as well as Belmont County, Ohio. Elizabeth McCullough's will manumitted the slaves she owned, and bequeathed the ferries that her family had established to sons Noah and Daniel. Zanesville, Ohio, was named in his honor.
