= Thomas Glenn (pioneer) =

American pioneer

- Born: 1750; Pennsylvania Colony
- Died: September 1777 (aged 26–27) now Wheeling, West Virginia, U.S.
- Allegiance: United States of America
- Service: 1774-1777 (3 years)
- Conflicts: Dunmore's War; American Revolution; 1st Siege of Fort Henry †

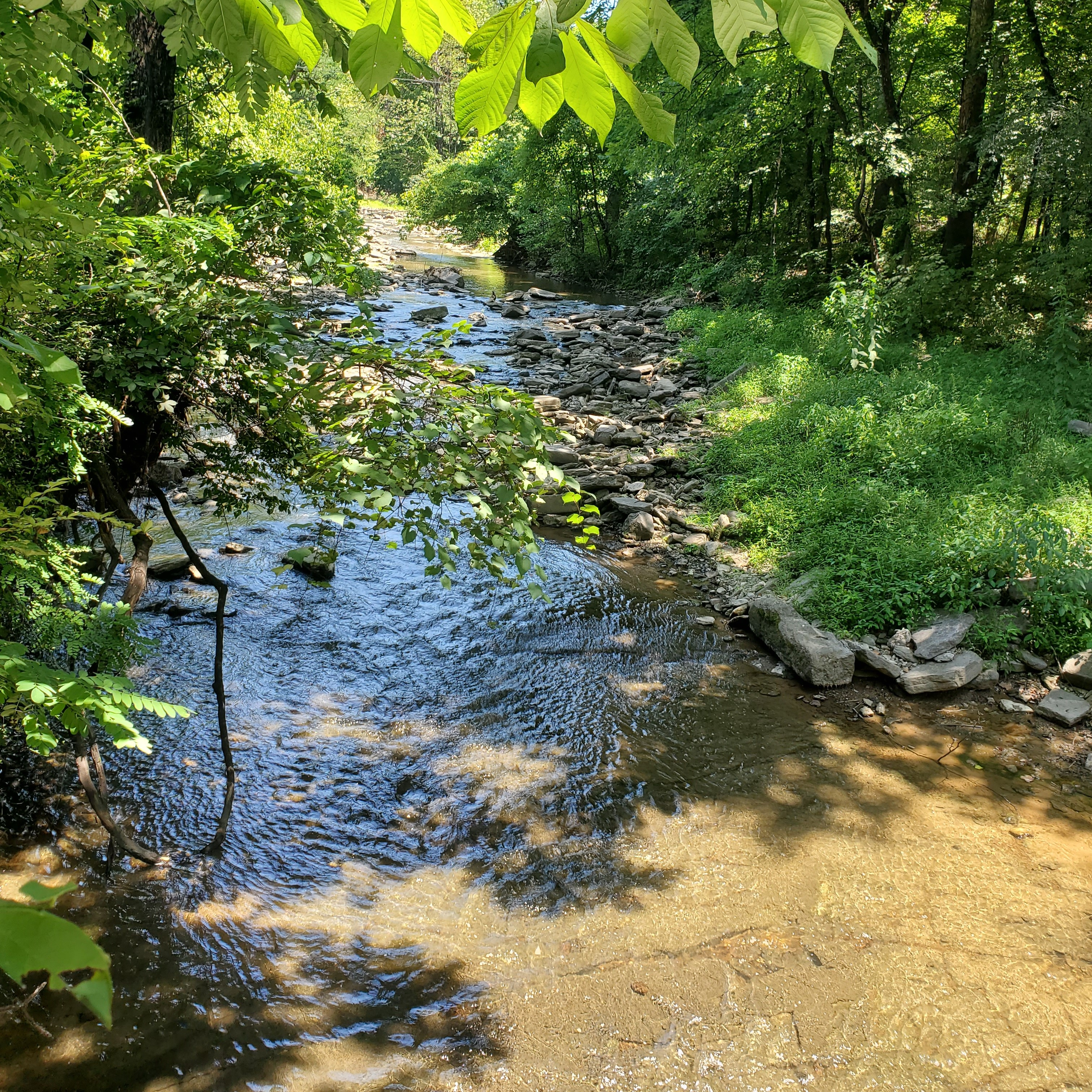
Glenn's Creek in 2020

Thomas Glenn (1750 - September 1777) was among the first pioneers to venture into the Western Virginia and Kentucky territories. He was born in 1750 in Pennsylvania, married before 1770 and settled in present-day Wheeling, West Virginia by 1774, but possibly earlier. He was part of an advanced detachment of John Floyd's survey expedition before joining James Harrod's party in founding Harrodstown, the earliest permanent white settlement west of the Appalachians, along with his younger brother David Glenn. Together they explored a large portion of Kentucky in the 1770s, making several improvements from Frankfort down to Russell Springs.

Thomas Glenn was killed in September 1777 at the Siege of Fort Henry from a thrown tomahawk into his back.

Glenn's Creek, branched off the Kentucky River just outside Frankfort, is named after Thomas and Glenn's Run, a stream running east-to-west from the Ohio River just north of Martin's Ferry in Wheeling, was probably named after him also.

== Harrod's Expedition ==
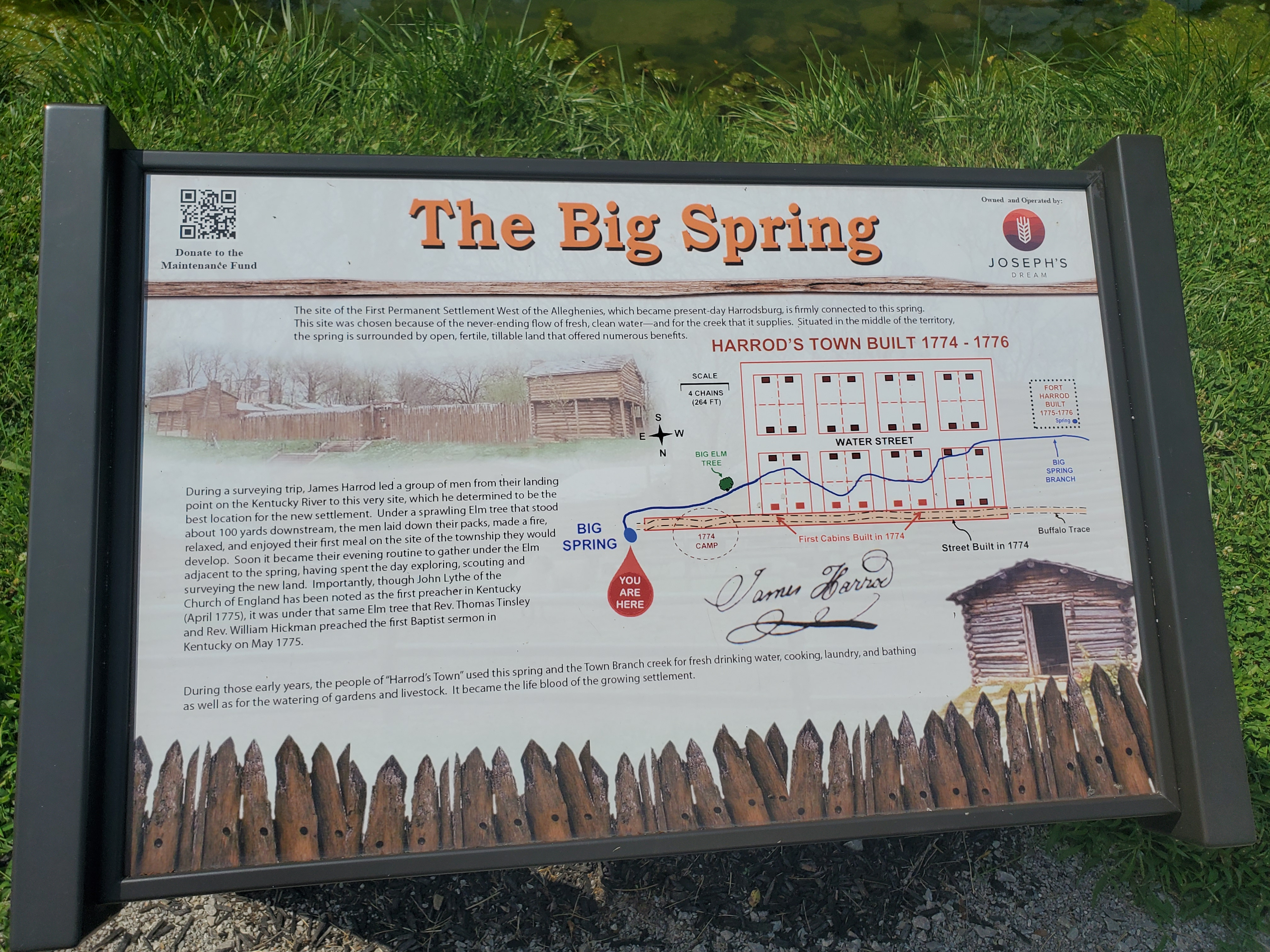
A plaque next to the Big Spring in Harrodsburg Kentucky

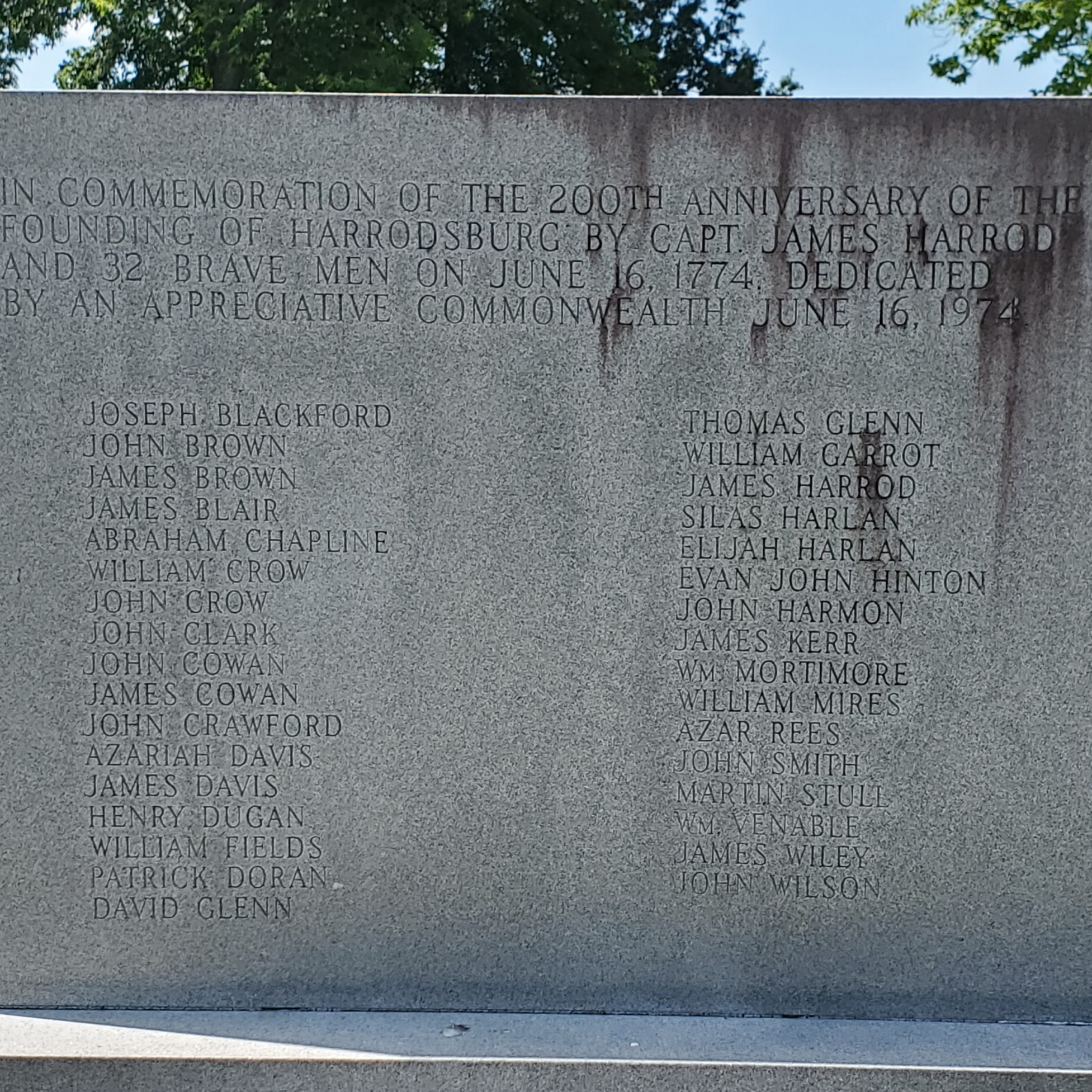
Harrodsburg Memorial

In April 1774, a few weeks before Harrod set off from Fort Redstone, Thomas Glenn was surveying with a small party of seven along the Ohio River, led by Lawrence Darnell. They were captured by members of the Shawnee tribe and held for three days before being set free and ordered off the river, being told that George Croghan had directed them to "kill all the Virginians they could find on the river and rob & whip the Pennsylvanians". Although not named in the letter written by John Floyd or Thomas Hanson's journal, Thomas' brother, David, was probably present as well.

Both brothers joined Harrod's party as he came down the Ohio River and were among the 32 men that came upon The Big Spring where they founded Harrodstown on June 16, 1774. The men laid out the town and were soon met by Daniel Boone and Michael Stoner, who were sent by Lord Dunmore to warn of imminent attacks from the natives and request support. When Boone arrived at Harrodstown, he stayed long enough to build himself a cabin and then went off to continue relaying Dunmore's message to the other pioneers in the area. Harrod's company decided to remain at the fort a while until one of their men was killed, at which point, they returned to Virginia by the Cumberland Gap where the majority of the men enlisted in Captain Harrod's company of Kentucky Pioneers in the Fincastle County Battalion. The Kentucky Pioneers were on route to Point Pleasant but arrived about midnight on the 10th of October just after the battle had ended. This was the only major action of Dunmore's War.

When Thomas returned home, he was imprisoned for murdering his indentured servant but acquitted and instead fined for "beating his servant ill". He did not rejoin Harrod when he returned to Harrodstown the following year, although his brother, David, did.

== Siege of Fort Henry ==
On the morning of September 1777, a few men were attacked outside the fort by a band of Mingo, Wyandot, Delaware and Shawnee, with only two escaping to give alarm. About 20 militiamen, led by Captain Samuel Mason, turned out to pursue the attackers but fell into an ambush of roughly 200 natives. Thomas Glenn was marching next to Captain Mason and killed a native while Mason was wounded and had his gun damaged by the shot. Mason took cover, as did several others, while Thomas began racing back towards the fort with Colonel David Shepherd's son, William, and Hugh McConnell, chased by "seven or eight howling warriors brandishing tomahawks". Glenn proposed they split up and angled towards the creek, while Shepherd and McConnell created a gap between themselves but still aimed towards the fort. Shepherd tripped and was killed by a smashing tomahawk into his head and scalped. Just before he reached the creek, Thomas was struck with a thrown tomahawk into his back and was hit again before he could get up and was likely scalped as well. McConnell was the only one who made it back to the fort.

In 1780, David, Thomas' brother, claimed his estate on behalf of Thomas' sons.
