= Mysterious Music =

Book by G. Burns Cooper

- Author: G. Burns Cooper
- Language: English
- Genre: Non-fiction
- Publisher: Stanford University Press
- Publication date: 1998
- Publication place: United States

Mysterious Music: Rhythm and Free Verse is a book by G. Burns Cooper, and published by Stanford University Press in 1998. It examines the rhythm of free verse, with particular reference to the works of T. S. Eliot, Robert Lowell, and James Wright. In attempting to understand the difference between free verse and prose, Burns Cooper analyses both the poems and prose writings of the authors.

Burns Cooper asserts that through combining a large number of factors—including metrical pulse, linguistic stress, intonational accent, alliteration and rhyme, the choice of words and their register, the placement of linebreaks, syntactic structure of sentences, and so forth—complex patterns are generated which readers may perceive as part of a "coherent system", and this is what makes the text of a free verse poem 'poetic'.

The main observations of the book are:

- adjacent stresses appear more often in the poetry than in the prose of the authors considered
- more monosyllabic nouns and adjectives appear in the poetry than in the prose
- Lowell and Eliot often use iambic patterns in their free verse, whereas Wright does not
- the characteristic rhythms of the authors involve repeated use of a limited number of syntactic figures

Burns Cooper concludes that there are two basic principles upon which poetry operates:

1. compression: more of the salient things together ... adjacent stresses, more nouns and adjectives than other parts of speech, key words repeated more often
2. regular alteration: examples of which include the iambic rhythm of syllables, and Lowell's participial modifiers (modifier, main clause, modifier, main clause ...)
