= Biker poetry =

Poetry related to motorcycle clubs

Biker poetry is a movement of poetry that grew out of the predominantly American lifestyle of the biker and motorcycle clubs following World War II.

== Background ==
Poets such as Hunter S. Thompson are credited with writing biker poetry, playing no small part in the genus by popularizing a literary movement that focused on the biker lifestyle when he released Hell's Angels: The Strange and Terrible Saga of the Outlaw Motorcycle Gangs.

== Overview ==
Biker poetry often embraces form, and may include fixed verse, free verse, folk song, concrete poetry, poetry slam and even "Baiku", a form of Haiku. Notable biker poets include Diane Wakoski, who authored a collection known as The motorcycle betrayal poems. Writers such as Colorado T. Sky and K Peddlar Bridges work with experimental poetry, however the biker genre tends to work with form, especially rhyming verse. Groups such as The Highway Poets Motorcycle Club have an international membership. The genre is a regular feature in many motorcycle magazines and motorcycle rallies.

Biker poets often use pseudonyms. These include "The Holy Ranger" (Dr. Martin Jack Rosenblum), "Wild Bill, the Alaskan Biker Poet" (William B Rogers), "Gypsypashn" (Betsy Lister), "Biker Jer" (Jerry Sawinski) and "Joe Go" (Jose Gouveia).

== Themes ==
Falling in love with a mustache
is like saying
you can fall in love with
the way a man polishes his shoes
which,
of course,
is one of the things that turns on
my tuned-up engine

— From "Uneasy Rider"
The Motorcycle Betrayal Poems
By Diane Wakoski, 1971

Biker Poetry is similar to cowboy poetry in that it can reflect a romantic American lifestyle. Verse will often focus on the loneliness or camaraderie associated with motorcycling, the day-to-day affairs of maintenance on the motorcycle, personal problems within a family that lives a biker lifestyle as well as substance abuse and its relation to bikers. Other popular themes include "the freedom of the road", outlaw clubs, interactions with cars and trucks (also referred to as 'cages'), biker values and practices, and the conflicts and tragedies associated with highway incidents.
