= Lying in a Hammock at William Duffy's Farm in Pine Island, Minnesota =

Poem by James Wright

"Lying in a Hammock at William Duffy's Farm in Pine Island, Minnesota" is a poem by American poet James Wright. It is one of his best known poems, partially because of the tonal contrast between the content of the poem and its final line.

== History ==
The poem was first published in The Paris Review in 1961. It was later featured in a short story by Ann Beattie also published in The Paris Review. The poem was included in Wright's collection This Branch Will Not Break.

== Content ==
The poem is a description of a pastoral scene from the perspective of a person in a hammock.

=== Final line ===
The poem concludes with the line "I have wasted my life." The line is one of the most highly regarded and widely debated lines in contemporary poetry, and has often been seen as having cemented Wright's poetic legacy.

The line has been widely interpreted. In 2010, Dan Piepenbring, writer for The Paris Review, summarized a large amount of the attention directed towards the poem:

Since [the poem's publication], that last line has inspired reams of analysis and debate—is it a lament? Is it a joke, a kind of boast? Did Wright intend to undercut or to bolster his pastoral scene with it? Could it be a winking response to Rilke, whose "Archaic Torso of Apollo" concludes with the imperative "You must change your life"?

Some have argued the line has no meaning. Thom Gunn asserted this was the case in 1964, writing that the line was "...certainly meaningless. The more one searches for an explicit meaning in it, the vaguer it becomes. Other general statements of different import could well be substituted for it and the poem would neither gain nor lose strength." Robert Bly, a friend of Wright, wrote a counter-argument to this interpretation however, criticizing Gunn and accusing him of being unable to relate to the emotion expressed by the line. Decades after the debate, David Mitchell theorized that the line was an optimistic one, writing: "...I hear him exhale it with a wry laugh".

The final line has also been interpreted as a representation of manic depression and bipolar disorder, both of which Wright had struggled with and often wrote about.

The line is discussed in Ann Beattie's short story "Yancey".

== Influences ==
Wright acknowledged that he was influenced by Chinese poetry in writing "Lying in a Hammock..." in an interview with Dave Smith. This influence has been discussed by academics including Sven Birkerts.

== Popularity and influence ==
The poem has been widely anthologized. It is one of novelist David Mitchell's favorite pieces of writing.

The poem's final line has been hailed as one of the greatest lines in modern poetry. Although there were degrees of polarization about the line's abrasiveness, it has been credited as influential in the development of deep image and modernist poetry.
