= Lewis Wetzel =

American scout and frontiersman

- Born: 1763; Lancaster County, Province of Pennsylvania
- Died: 1808 (aged 44–45); Natchez, Mississippi, US
- Resting place: McCreary Cemetery, Marshall County, West Virginia
- Occupations: frontiersman, scout, Indian fighter

Lewis Wetzel (1763–1808) was an American scout and frontiersman. Because of how feared he was by the Native American Tribes, he was nicknamed "Death Wind". He stood about 5 ft 10in with knee length black hair. He was an expert with a knife and tomahawk and was even deadlier with a black powder rifle, or musket. While running at full speed, Death Wind could load powder from his powder horn, a ball round and pack it, aim it and fire with expert marksmanship every time. Raised in what is now the Northern Panhandle of West Virginia, his exploits were once hailed as similar to those of Daniel Boone.

== Early and family life ==
Possibly born in Lancaster County, Pennsylvania in 1763, or on the South Branch of the Potomac River where his parents had moved before 1770, Lewis was the son of Mary Bonnet (1735–1805; daughter of Jean Jacques Bonnet, Flemish Huguenot) and John Wetzel (1733–1786; indentured servant emigrant from Germany's Palatine region or Friedrichstal, Baden, Germany). The Wetzel and Bonnet families moved to the Wheeling Creek area in what is now the northern panhandle of West Virginia by 1770, as had the Zane, McColloch, Eberly, Rosencranz and other pioneer families. Such settlement had been illegal according to a treaty made by the British ending the French and Indian War, but the disputed Treaty of Fort Stanwix (1768) (made with the Iroquois, traditional enemies of the Shawnee and other tribes of the areas being ceded) led many pioneers to again try westward settlement.

The Wetzel family settled in a fairly isolated location near the Ohio River about 14 miles from Fort Henry (which had been built at the confluence of Wheeling Creek to protect settlers from Indian raids). Despite the hardships of frontier living, several Wetzel children survived to adulthood: Martin (1757–1829), Jacob (1765–1827), John and George (d. 1786), as well as daughters Susannah Wetzel Goodrich (1767–1828) and Christina Wetzel Wolfe (1759–1786). As discussed below, the Wetzels suffered many raids by Native Americans. Raids became particularly severe following the murder of Chief Logan's family near Fort Henry in 1774 (which led to Lord Dunmore's War). The execution of Chief Cornstalk in 1777 at Fort Randolph (at the confluence of the Ohio and Kanawha Rivers, modern Point Pleasant, West Virginia) also led to attacks at Fort Henry. The elder John Wetzel, his son George and daughter Christina all died in raids in 1786, before Lewis Wetzel reached age 25, and led to his Indian-fighting career. Lewis Wetzel's older brother, Martin (1757–1829), a friend of Daniel Boone and Simon Kenton, helped his father fight Native Americans in the Battle of Point Pleasant in 1774, and defended Fort Henry in 1777 and 1782, although one of his favorite frontier weapons was a tomahawk. His younger brother Jacob Wetzel (or Whetzel), helped construct a wagon road into central Indiana after fighting Indian wars in western Pennsylvania and the Northwest Territory with Kenton and under Generals Arthur St. Clair and William Henry Harrison.

== Hated For Native Americans & Lewis' Proceeding Serial Murders ==
In 1778, Lewis, then 13, and his brother Jacob, 11, were tending the family's corn field during a raid by Wyandot Native Americans, and taken prisoner but managed to escape two days later. A bullet grazed Lewis's breastbone before his capture, but his captors were able to staunch the bleeding and lead the boys away. The boys managed to return to Fort Henry (modern Wheeling, West Virginia), which the Wetzel men also helped defend in September 1782. Wetzel grew to some six feet tall, and became striking and very athletic, but some considered him socially inept, in part because he never cut his hair, which grew extremely long and was held in a ponytail as often also done by Native Americans. He rationalized it as expecting he would be scalped as he had scalped many. His varied skills in what is now known as guerrilla warfare became famous.

In 1781, Col. Daniel Brodhead reached the main Turtle clan village of Gekelmukpechunk, now known as Newcomerstown, Ohio. He requested a peaceful discussion between the main chiefs of the village and three were sent to meet him. He hoped to secure the villagers' allegiance and enlist new warriors into his campaign. However, Lewis Wetzel's younger brother Martin attacked one of the peaceful chiefs with a tomahawk from behind, killing him just as they had crossed the river. Fearing massive losses and an unplanned battle, Brodhead retreated and instead refocused his troops on their initial goal of reaching Coshocton.

In June 1786, four of the Wetzel men were returning by canoe from a hunting trip when they were attacked by tribesmen. Although Lewis Wetzel managed to canoe beyond musket range (and was not wounded), his father John and brother George died before reaching Baker's Station, though his brother Martin survived his wound. At some point, the young man vowed to avenge his family.

Wetzel later participated in several military campaigns against Native American tribes in the Ohio region, and claimed to have taken 27 or 37 Native American scalps. He preferred to operate alone; military procedure did not suit him even while serving with the militia. He became renowned for an ability to load his rifle while sprinting (perhaps by using smaller shot than other frontiersman as well as for always holding a few bullets in his mouth), and which probably saved his life several times during raids although lead poisoning would have ongoing mental and physical effects.

Lewis Wetzel was implicated in the deaths of several friendly Native Americans, and he may have knived others to death as they slept. The most famous incident turning public opinion against him involved the Seneca Chief Tegunteh (whom American soldiers called "George Washington" for his upright character), who had traveled to Fort Harmar, near present-day Marietta, Ohio in 1788. Wetzel ambushed, shot and scalped Tegunteh on an isolated path; the dying chief survived long enough to identify his attacker. Wetzel readily admitted the deed on November 6 to Colonel Josiah Harmar, bragging “I´ll shoot ‘em down like the worthless dogs they are long as I live,” but escaped by sprinting away through the woods, and when recaptured two weeks later, clubbed his jailer with his chains and escaped again before trial; when captured in mid-December near Maysville, Kentucky and taken to Fort Washington (now Cincinnati), a 200-man mob led by Kenton threatened the peace and Harmar released Wetzel. The future President James Madison's brother John Madison died in an attack near the Kanawha River while on a seven-month expedition with Wetzel as his scout, and the same account claims Lewis and Clark asked Wetzel to join their expedition (although mentioned in neither their letters or diaries). Either following a suspended death sentence for killing a Native American in 1791 or as many Native Americans left the Ohio Valley following the 1795 Treaty of Greenville, Wetzel relocated to the Louisiana Territory and eventually to New Orleans, where he spent several years in prison for counterfeiting.

== Death and legacy ==
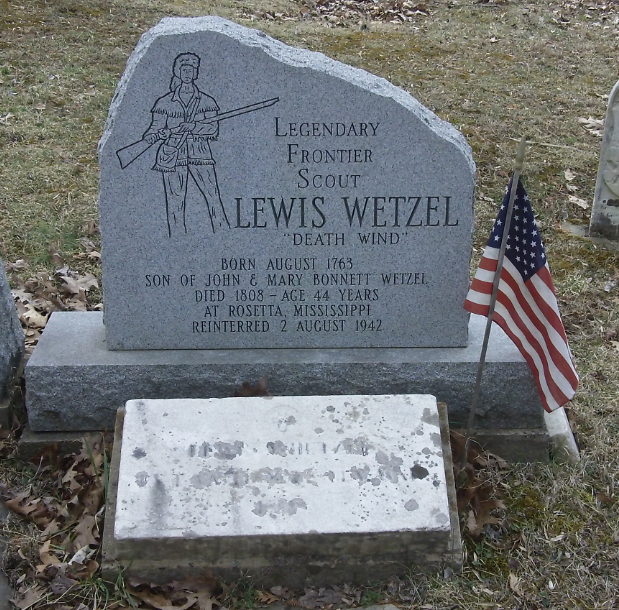
Lewis Wetzel resting place, McCreary Cemetery, Marshall County, WV

Accounts about his final years vary. He had no known children, although several of his siblings had children, and some were named in his honor. Most likely Lewis Wetzel died in 1808 in Natchez, Mississippi, at the residence of his cousin Philip Sykes, since a skeleton matching Wetzel's description including the long hair was exhumed along with a rifle and other equipment at Sykes' former farm. The remains were reinterred in the McCreary Cemetery in Marshall County, West Virginia. Some believe Wetzel married a Spanish woman, settled along the Brazos River and died in 1839.

Another Lewis Wetzel (1825–1862) of Point Pleasant, West Virginia (judge and newspaper editor) was one of the founders of the state of West Virginia, but murdered by another pro-Union founder, John Hall. Martin Wetzel's direct descendant, Robert Lewis Wetzel (his middle name reflecting this scout), of Clarksburg, West Virginia, was a veteran of the Korean and Vietnam wars, and rose to the rank of Lieutenant General and Corps commander during the Cold War.

Among places in West Virginia, Wetzel County, West Virginia, is named for him or his family, as is the Lewis Wetzel Wildlife Management Area. West Virginia has erected historical markers commemorating the Wetzel family near Limestone in Marshall County and specifically mentions Lewis Wetzel on the markers for Fort Beeler and Terra Alta in Preston County. An Ohio historical marker notes Lewis Wetzel's involvement in the Broadhead Massacre of peaceful Indians at the Moravian mission. The Western novelist Zane Grey wrote about Wetzel in his books Betty Zane, The Spirit of the Border, and The Last Trail. More recently, Allan W. Eckert recounts Wetzel's exploits in That Dark and Bloody River. The Norwegian novelist Louis Masterson (Kjell Hallbing) wrote several books and shortstories about the fictional anti-hero Owen Metzgar, nicknamed The rifle that sings, and based him on Wetzel. In the stories it is implied that Wetzel was the mentor and friend of Metzgar.
