= Betty Zane (novel) =

1903 novel by Zane Grey

- Author: Zane Grey
- Language: English
- Genre: Western
- Publication date: 1903
- Publication place: United States
- Followed by: The Spirit of the Border (1906)

Betty Zane is a historical novel written by Zane Grey, first published in 1903. It is his first novel.

The novel is based on events occurring in the Ohio River Valley in the late eighteenth century. It features the author's great-grandmother, Betty Zane, during the Siege of Fort Henry during the American Revolutionary War.

The novel is the first in what would become a trilogy, with The Spirit of the Border and The Last Trail following it.
