= Joseph Ogle =

American soldier and frontiersman (1737–1821)

- Born: June 17, 1737; Frederick, Maryland, British America
- Died: February 24, 1821 (aged 83) St. Clair County, Illinois, U.S.
- Branch: Virginia Militia; United States Army
- Service years: 1777–1782
- Rank: Captain
- Known for: Pioneer settler of Illinois; founder of the first Methodist church in Illinois
- Conflicts: American Revolutionary War; Siege of Fort Henry (1777); Siege of Fort Henry (1782)
- Spouses: Prudence Biggs (m. 1762; died 1777) Jemima Meiggs (m. 1780)
- Children: 10
- Other work: Pioneer; church founder
- Relatives: Ogle family

Joseph Ogle (June 17, 1737 – February 24, 1821) was an American soldier, pioneer, and religious leader who was a prominent figure in the early settlement of the Illinois Country. A veteran of the American Revolutionary War, he served as a captain in the Virginia militia, notably commanding troops in the Siege of Fort Henry in 1777.

== Early years ==
Joseph Ogle was born on June 17, 1737, at Owens Creek in what is now Frederick County, Maryland (then part of Prince George's County in British America). He was the eldest child of Benjamin Ogle (1715–1779) and first wife Rebecca Ogle (née Browner; c. 1720 – before 1760). Raised on the edge of the Maryland frontier, Ogle grew up in a prominent pioneer family; his uncle, Major Joseph Ogle, was a well-known local figure who helped establish early roads in the region.

Ogle grew up in a large household alongside five full siblings, including his two younger brothers Jacob and Thomas. Following the death of Joseph's mother, his father remarried Agnes Harris, with whom he had six more children. In 1756, following the death of their uncle, Major Joseph Ogle, Joseph and his younger brothers received land inheritances that allowed the young men to move away from their stepmother and live their own livelihoods.

In 1762, Ogle married Prudence Drusilla Biggs in Frederick County, where they initially began raising their family. Seeking new opportunities and cheaper land, Ogle moved his family westward in 1769, settling along Buffalo Creek in western Virginia (near modern-day Wheeling, West Virginia). He was accompanied by his brothers Jacob and Thomas; all three would later serve together as patriots on the western frontier during the American Revolutionary War.

== American Revolutionary War ==
In 1777, the family was living on Buffalo Creek in what is today Brooke County, West Virginia. Capt. Joseph Ogle commanded a Virginia company during the Revolutionary War. He was involved in the Siege of Fort Henry in what is now West Virginia.He married a second wife, Jemima Meiggs or Meeks, with whom he had four children. All of the children were born in what was then Virginia.

== Illinois ==
Ogle left Virginia in opposition to slavery. By 1785, Ogle had settled his family in the Northwest Territory, which is present-day Monroe County, Illinois. Ogle is said to have been the first Methodist in Illinois, and helped found the Shiloh Methodist Church, the first Methodist Church. Ogle first settled on the road from Bellefontaine to Cahokia. In 1796, he moved to New Design, in what is now Monroe County. In 1791, Ogle was involved in a skirmish with Native Americans near what is now Waterloo, Illinois.

== Death ==
Joseph Ogle died on February 24, 1821, in New Design, Illinois. He is buried in St. Clair County, Illinois. Ogle had a son who was also named Joseph Ogle. His son was involved in the Black Hawk War, and died in 1846.

== See also ==
- Ogle County, Illinois
