= Lewis Wetzel Wildlife Management Area =

State Wildlife Management Area in Wetzel County, West Virginia

- IUCN category V (protected landscape/seascape)
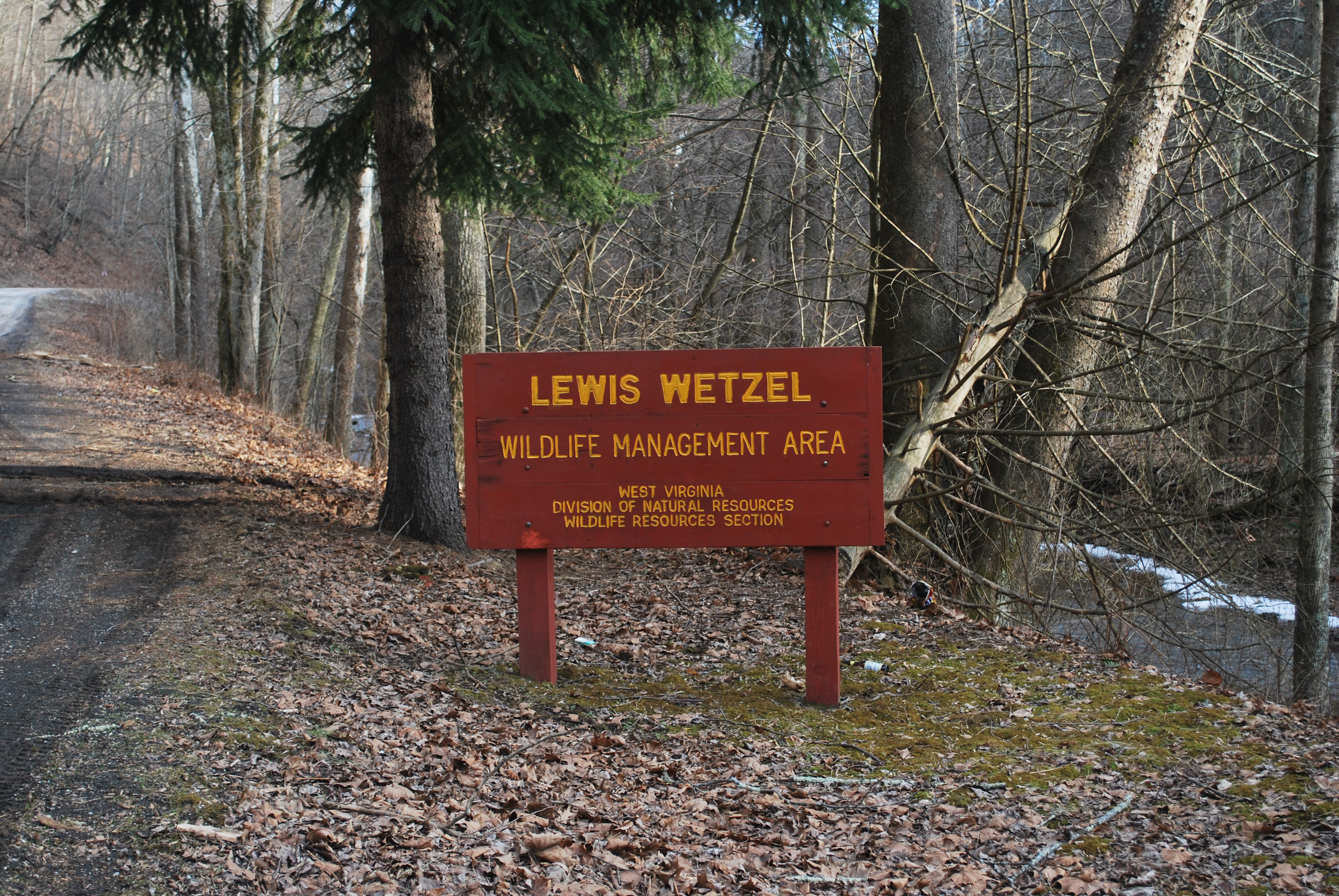
- Entrance to Lewis Wetzel WMA along CR 82

- Location within West Virginia
- Location: Wetzel, West Virginia, United States
- Coordinates: 39°31′22″N 80°38′51″W
- Area: 13,590 acres (55.0 km^{2})
- Elevation: 785 ft (239 m)

Lewis Wetzel Wildlife Management Area (WMA) is located in Wetzel County, West Virginia, USA, about 0.75 miles (1.21 km) south of Jacksonburg on County Route 82. It is located on 13,590 acres (5,500 ha) of steep terrain with narrow valleys and ridgetops. The WMA second growth mixed hardwoods and hemlock with a thick understory of mountain laurel and rhododendron.

The wildlife management area and Wetzel County are named for Lewis Wetzel, an early settler and frontiersman in this area of West Virginia.

== Hunting and fishing ==
Hunting opportunities include deer, grouse, raccoon, squirrel and turkey.

Fishing opportunities on the South Fork of Fishing Creek can include smallmouth bass, spotted bass and trout. County Route 20 follows the South Fork of Fishing Creek.

Rustic camping is available seasonally in the WMA. A 100-yard (91 m) shooting range is also available.

== See also ==
- Animal conservation
- Camping
- Fishing
- Hunting
- List of West Virginia wildlife management areas
