= The Spirit of the Border =

1906 novel by Zane Grey

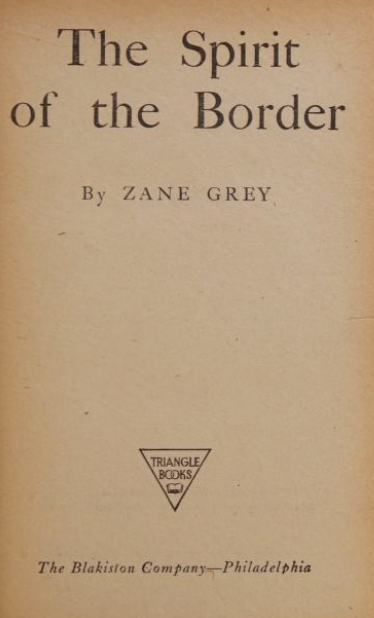
- Title page for The Spirit of the Border (1906)
- Author: Zane Grey
- Illustrator: J. Watson Davis
- Language: English
- Genre: Western
- Publisher: A. L. Burt
- Publication date: 1906
- Publication place: United States
- Media type: Print, 8vo.
- Pages: 266
- Preceded by: Betty Zane (1903)
- Followed by: The Last Trail (1909)

The Spirit of the Border is a historical novel written by Zane Grey, first published in 1906. The novel is based on events occurring in the Ohio River Valley in the late eighteenth century. It features the exploits of Lewis Wetzel, a historical personage who had dedicated his life to the destruction of Native Americans and to the protection of nascent white settlements in that region. The story deals with the attempt by Moravian Church missionaries to Christianize Indians and how two brothers' lives take different paths upon their arrival on the border. A highly romanticized account, the novel is the second in a trilogy, the first of which is Betty Zane, Grey's first published work, and The Last Trail, which focuses on the life of Jonathan Zane, Grey's ancestor.
