= Siege of Fort Henry (1782) =

American victory in the Revolutionary War

Coordinates: 40°03′50″N 80°43′30″W

- Part of the American Revolutionary War
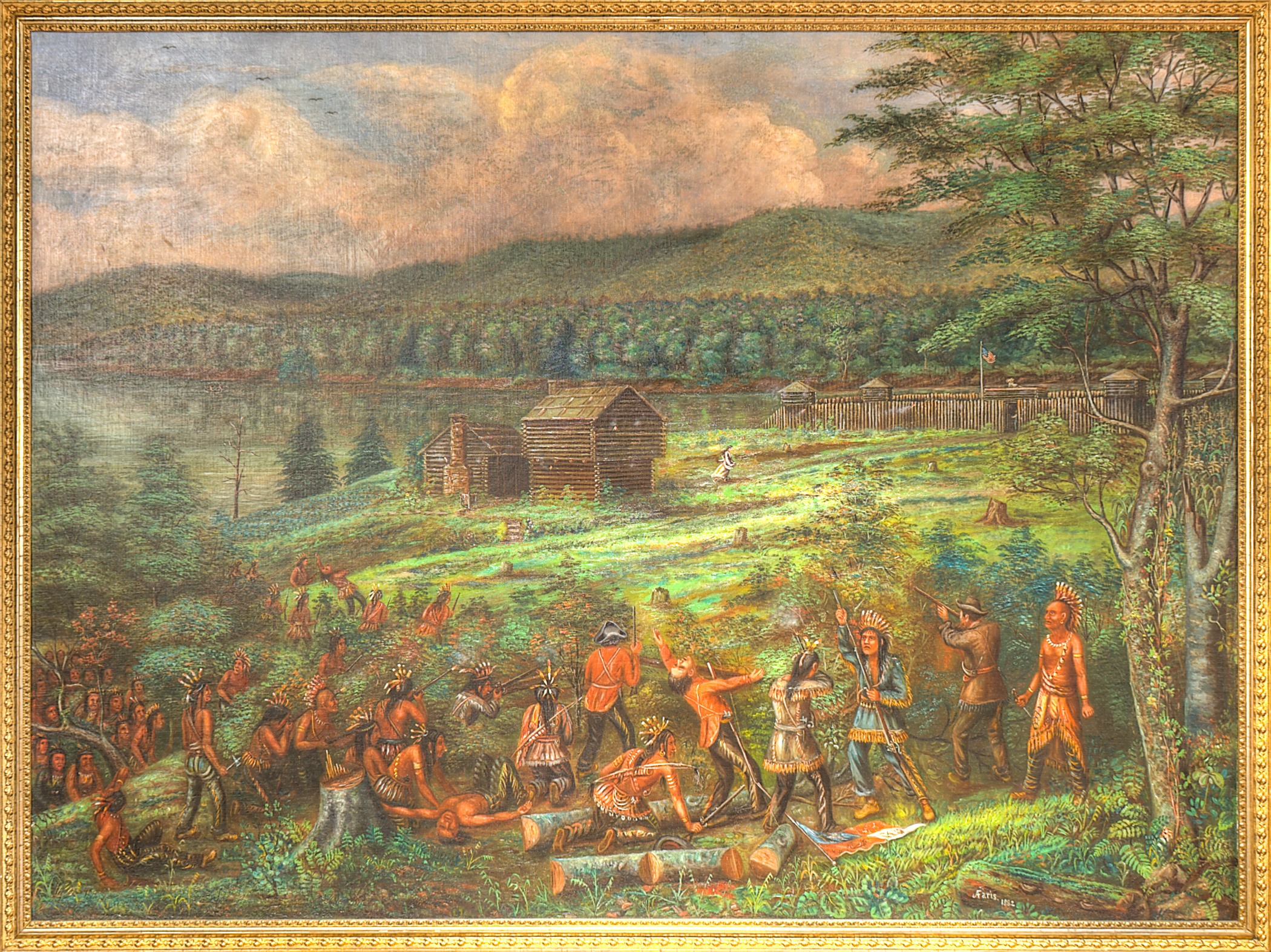
- 1782 Siege of Fort Henry by J. Faris; West Virginia State Museum
Date	September 11–13, 1782
Location	Wheeling, West Virginia
Result	American victory

Belligerents
United States	Great Britain; Wyandot; Shawnee; Mingo; Lenape

Commanders and leaders
Ebenezer Zane; Silas Zane	Arent Brandt

Strength
~20 militia	40 provincials 260 Indigenous

Casualties and losses
1 wounded	Unknown

The second siege of Fort Henry was a three-day engagement during the American Revolutionary War that began on September 11, 1782. A force of about 260 Wyandot, Shawnee, Mingo and Lenape attacked Fort Henry, an American fortification at what is now Wheeling, West Virginia. They were accompanied by 40 soldiers from Butler's Rangers, a British provincial regiment. The siege was one of the last engagements of the Revolutionary War. In the 19th century, the story of the siege became well known to Americans due to the "gunpowder exploit" of Betty Zane.

== Background ==
Built in 1774 during Lord Dunmore's War on a bluff above the Ohio River, Fort Henry protected the settlers who began moving into the area in 1769. By 1782, roughly 25 families were living in the vicinity of the fort, including Ebenezer Zane and his brother Silas.

The fort's wooden palisade enclosed an area of about half an acre with bastions at each corner. Inside was a magazine, barracks, several cabins, and a well. A swivel gun was mounted on the roof of the barracks. Fort Henry did not have a regular garrison and was usually unoccupied. Most of the available gunpowder was stored in Zane's fortified house about 70 yards (64 m) from the fort.

During the Revolutionary War, the area was subjected to a number of raids by Native Americans. Before 1782, the most significant was a brief siege in September 1777 that saw a few hundred Wyandot, Mingo, Shawnee, and Lenape attempt to storm the fort.

== Siege ==
During the summer of 1782, British Indian Department officials assembled an army of Wyandot, Shawnee, Mingo and Lenape warriors at the Shawnee village of Chillicothe. In August, several hundred of these warriors crossed the Ohio River with Captain William Caldwell's company of Butler's Rangers and attacked Bryan Station. They later defeated a body of Kentucky militia at the Battle of Blue Licks. In September, roughly 260 warriors and 40 Butler's Rangers under the command of Captain Andrew Bradt besieged Fort Henry.

John Lynn, an American scout, spotted Bradt's expedition a few hours before it reached Fort Henry. This gave the inhabitants time to flee to the fort and man the walls. Ebenezer Zane elected to remain in his fortified house along with a few family members, friends, and two slaves, while his brother Silas took command of the fort. Silas had fewer than 20 men to defend the fort, while roughly forty women and children sheltered inside. Silas's and Ebenezer's teenage sister, Betty, was among them.

Zane reported that when Bradt's force reached Fort Henry on September 11, they “formed their lines round the garrison, paraded British colors, and demanded the fort to be surrendered, which was refused." Around midnight, the rangers and warriors attempted to storm the fort and set it alight, but were driven back. Two more attempts were made that night, both on the fort and on Zane's blockhouse.

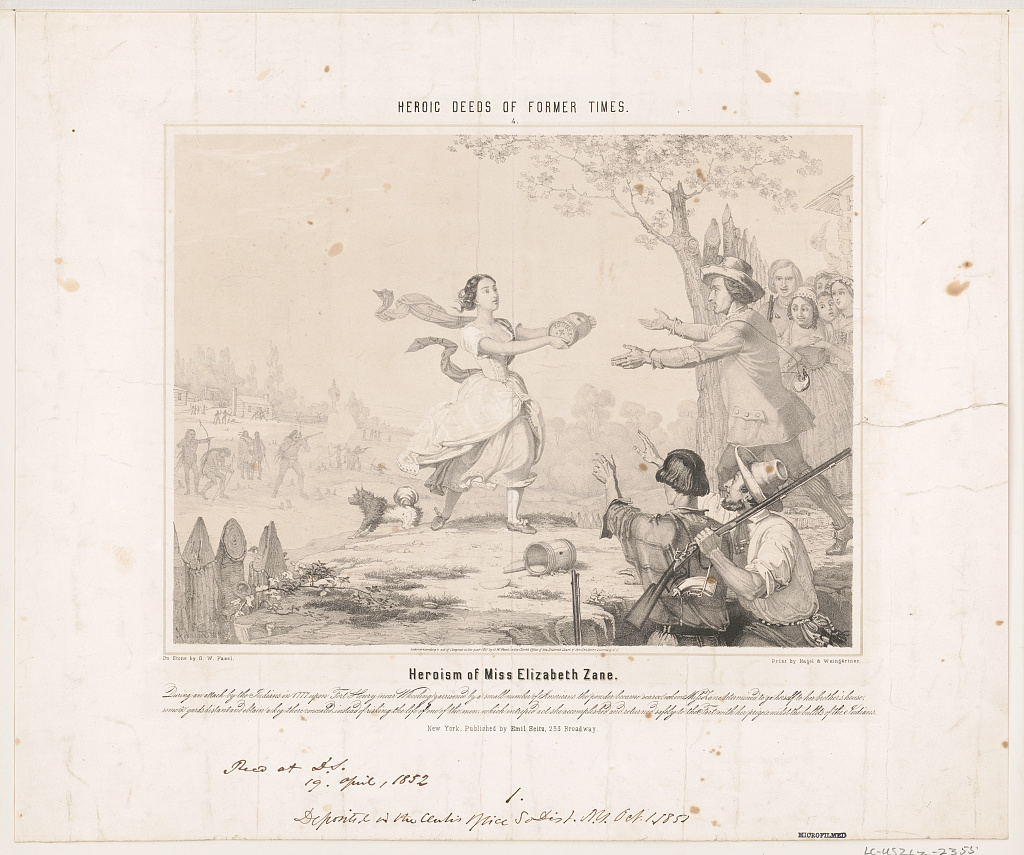
Depiction of the "gunpowder exploit" of Betty Zane. Most sources record that Betty carried the gunpowder bundled in a tablecloth.

By dawn of the second day of the siege the fort's supply of gunpowder was growing low. Betty Zane volunteered to retrieve a supply of gunpowder from her brother's house. She argued that the enemy would be less inclined to shoot a woman and that none of the men defending the fort could be spared. At about noon the gate of Fort Henry was opened and Betty ran the 70 yards to the blockhouse. While she was taunted by the Indigenous warriors, she was not fired upon and reached her brother's house safely. On the return trip, some of the warriors realized what she was carrying and opened fire, however, she escaped injury. Most sources record that Betty carried the gunpowder bundled in a tablecloth or apron.

Bradt made another assault on the fort that evening but was again driven back. Bradt withdrew his forces the following morning. According to Ebenezer Zane's report, only one person was wounded among those who sheltered in the fort.

A number of implausible claims have been made about the siege. In History of the Early Settlement And Indian Wars of Western Virginia, published in 1851, Wills De Haas recorded that a group of Indigenous warriors attempted to make a cannon from a tree trunk. The makeshift cannon exploded killing several of them. An earlier version of this story appears in Alexander Scott Withers's Chronicles of Border Warfare. Historian Eric Sterner has suggested that the episode has a "whiff of frontier legend about it." De Hass also erroneously credited Simon Girty, the "white savage," with organizing and leading the attack on Fort Henry. Simon Girty was not present at the siege, however, his brother James was with Bradt as an interpreter.

== Legacy ==
Several poets have written about Betty Zane. John S. Adams wrote a poem called "Elizabeth Zane" that was first published in 1880 in St. Nicholas, a children's magazine and later included in the 1911 anthology Poems on Ohio. Poet and politician Thomas Dunn English, who feuded with Edgar Allan Poe, wrote "Betty Zane," a long narrative poem in iambic rhyming couplets that was included in his 1879 anthology American Ballads. and later in his 1885 anthology, The Boy's Book of Battle Lyrics.

In 1923, a monument to Betty Zane was erected across the river from Wheeling in Martin's Ferry, her home following her marriage. Martin's Ferry has hosted an annual Betty Zane Days festival since at least 1994. A subdivision, community center and road northwest of Wheeling, West Virginia is also named after her.

Betty Zane's great-grandnephew, the prolific American author Zane Grey, wrote his first novel about her, titled Betty Zane. The novel was published in 1903 and republished in 1974 as The Last Ranger. When Grey could not find a publisher for the book, he used his wife's money to pay for its printing. Grey later named his daughter Betty Zane after his famous aunt.
