= James Wright Poetry Festival =

Annual poetry festival in Martins Ferry, Ohio, United States

- Status: Active
- Genre: Poetry festival
- Date: April (variable)
- Frequency: Annual (with hiatus 2008–2017)
- Locations: Martins Ferry Public Library, Martins Ferry, Ohio, U.S.
- Years active: 1981–2007, 2018, 2023–present
- Founder: Eastern Ohio Arts Council

The James Wright Poetry Festival was held annually in early spring in Martins Ferry, Ohio, United States, Wright's home town, to celebrate the poetry of James Wright, the Pulitzer Prize-winning American poet.

== History ==
=== Founding and early growth (1981–2007) ===
The festival was created by the Eastern Ohio Arts Council in cooperation with librarians at the Martins Ferry Public Library one year after Wright’s death. The inaugural programme on 18 April 1981 featured readings by Wright’s friends Robert Bly and Dave Smith.

By the early 1990s registrations exceeded the capacity of the library auditorium, forcing organisers to move headline events to local school halls. Over its first 27 editions the roster included U.S. Poet Laureate Billy Collins and Pulitzer winners Mary Oliver, Galway Kinnell, Sharon Olds, Yusef Komunyakaa, Carolyn Kizer, Robert Hass and Stanley Kunitz.

=== Hiatus (2008–2017) ===
After the 2007 edition the festival was put on hold because of cuts to Ohio state arts funding and the retirement or relocation of several long‑serving committee members.

=== Revival ===
==== 2018 “Phoenix Festival” ====
Interest generated by Jonathan Blunk’s authorised biography James Wright: A Life in Poetry (2017) led to a one‑day revival on 21 April 2018 featuring Blunk, Wright’s widow Annie Wright, poets Stanley Plumly, Maggie Anderson and Ohio Poet Laureate Dave Lucas.

==== Return to an annual schedule (2023–present) ====
In March 2023 the Ohio Poetry Association, with support from the Belmont County District Library and a grant from the Ohio Arts Council, announced the festival’s permanent return. The relaunched event included a Wright walking tour, workshops and headline readings by biographer Blunk and poet‑critic David Baker. Subsequent editions have continued each April.

== Organisation and funding ==
The festival is organised by volunteer directors in partnership with the Belmont County District Library and the Ohio Poetry Association. Core funding comes from the Ohio Arts Council, with additional support from Ohio University Eastern, the Martins Ferry Area Historical Society and regional businesses.
