= Cecil Hobbs =

Cecil Hobbs (April 22, 1907 – December 8, 1991) was an American scholar of Southeast Asian history, best known for being the head of the Southern Asia Section of the Orientalia (now Asian) Division of the Library of Congress. He was regarded as a major contributor to scholarship on Asia and the development of South East Asian coverage in American library collections during a career at the Library of Congress spanning 28 years.

Born on April 22, 1907, in Martins Ferry, Ohio, Hobbs graduated with B.A. degree in history from the University of Illinois, where he was a lecturer for two years. In 1933, he was awarded a B.D. degree from the Colgate Rochester Divinity School in New York state. Hobbs's initial contact with Southeast Asian studies came in 1935, when he traveled with his wife Cecile Jackson Hobbs to Burma, where he served under the American Baptist Mission Board as a field administrator and professor at the Pierce Divinity College and the Burma Theological Seminary. He taught in Burmese. With the outbreak of the Second World War, Imperial Japan swept through East and South East Asia, and Hobbs and his wife returned to the United States after the Japanese invasion of Burma in 1942. Hobbs resumed graduate study at Colgate Rochester, receiving both a Th.M. degree and a doctorate of theology.

Hobbs joined the Library of Congress in 1943, specialising on Southeast Asia, and was elevated to the head of the Southern Asian Section in 1958. During his period as the head, he made six field trips to Southeast Asia to acquire publications for the Library. His accounts of the publishing landscape and publications obtained were distributed by the Southeast Asia Program of Cornell University for dissemination to scholars and librarians across the globe. In addition, he authored Understanding the Peoples of Southern Asia (University of Illinois Press, 1967); History and Culture of Southern Asia (University of Illinois Press, 1968); and Research Needs Relating to Southeast Asia (Southeast Asia Development Advisory Group, 1969), and bibliographical publications. After his retirement, he served for one year as a consultant to the library of the Australian National University in Canberra. He also served as a subeditor for Southern Asia for the American Historical Review; he sat on the advisory board of contributing consultants to the International Library Review (London); and was a member of the international editorial advisory board of Southeast Asia; an International Quarterly.

Hobbs was a charter member of the Association for Asian Studies, which was set up in 1948 as the Far Eastern Association. He was the chairman of its Committee on American Library Resources on Southeast Asia for several years, and remained active in the activities of its successor body, the Committee on Research Materials on Southeast Asia. He was key player in organising the Conference on American Library Resources on Southern Asia held in 1957 and the Conference on Access to Southeast Asian Research Materials in 1970. Both of these events were held at the Library of Congress. In recognition of his contributions to Southeast Asian librarianship and the Library of Congress, he was decorated with a Meritorious Service Award in 1967 and a Superior Service Award in 1971.

Away from his academic career, Hobbs served as a clergyman in the Virginia Conference of the United Methodist Church. He died at the age of 84 on December 8, 1991. His wife died soon after on January 9, 1992. A joint memorial service was held for the couple on January 16, 1992, officiated by his niece's husband, Stanley Rieger, at the Fairlington United Methodist Church in Alexandria, Virginia.
