= Dunquat =

Half-King of the Wyandot people

Dunquat (Petawontakas, Dunquad, Daunghquat; Lenape name, Pomoacan), known as the Half-King of the Wyandot people, sided with the Kingdom of Great Britain in the American Revolutionary War. He and his people moved to the Ohio country to fight the Americans in the west. He led a mixed band of about 200 Indians (predominantly Wyandot and Mingo, although there were also some Shawnee and Lenape) at the Siege of Fort Henry (1777). During the war, he protected Christian Lenape people from other members of their tribe prejudiced against their beliefs.

Half King "was particularly attentive to prevent all drunkenness, knowing that bloodshed and murder would immediately follow." He insisted on the removal of the Christian Indians from the vicinity of Sandusky, believing it to be unsafe for them to remain there; he also protected the Moravians and their converts from maltreatment when the missionaries were sent to Detroit ...

Dunquat besieged Fort Randolph, West Virginia in 1778.

Warriors from Half-King's village captured a young Pennsylvanian man, George Foulkes (1769–1840), in 1780. After more than ten years with the Wyandots, Foulkes escaped, becoming a member of the Spies from Washington County, and Captain Sam Brady's Rangers.

After the American Revolutionary War, Dunquat allied with Little Turtle and resisted the US expansion westwards, but agreed to the Treaty of Greenville.
