= Martins Ferry, Ohio =

City in Ohio, US

- City
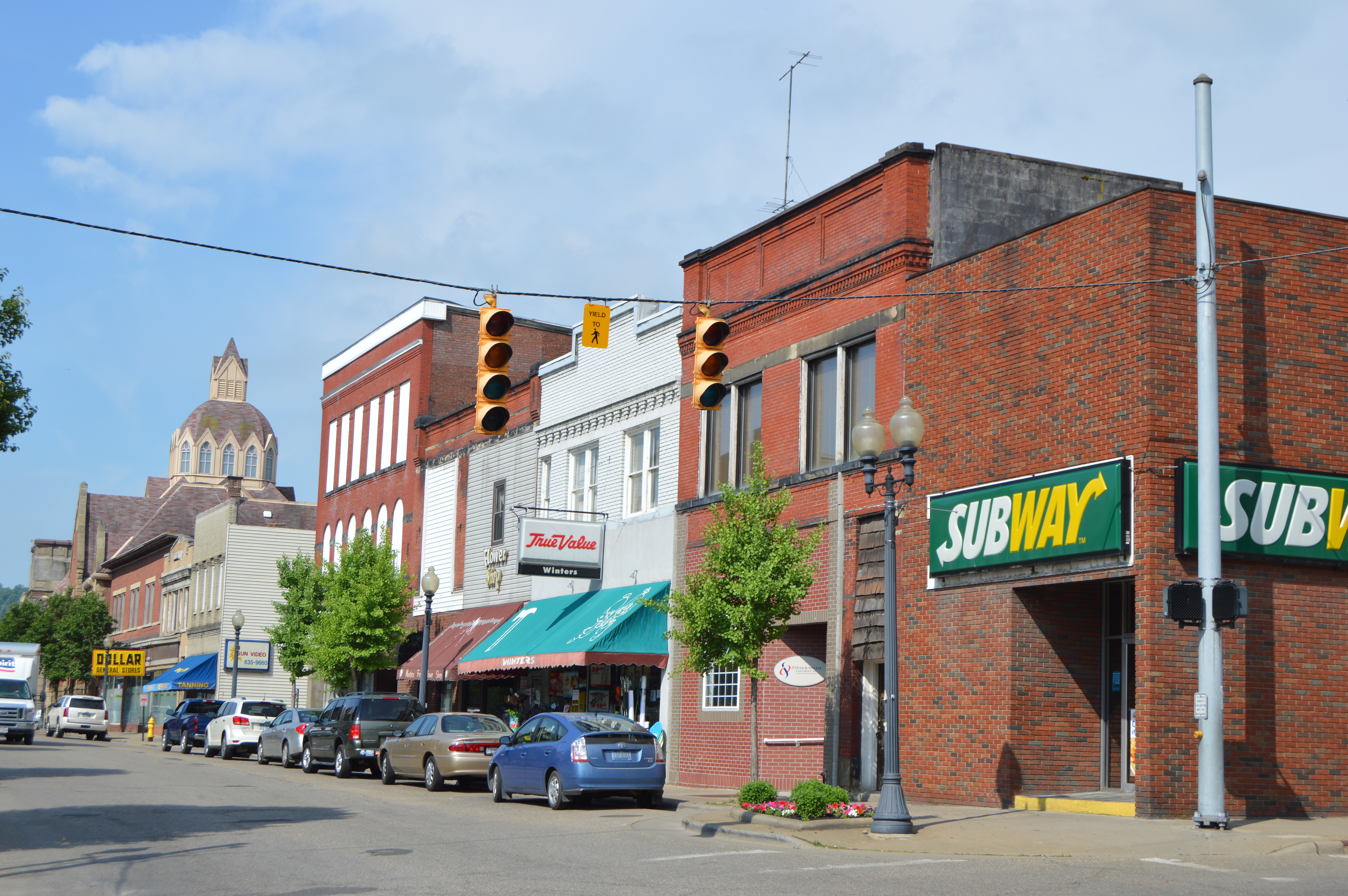
- Fourth Street downtown

- Seal
- Nickname: Ohio's First Settlement
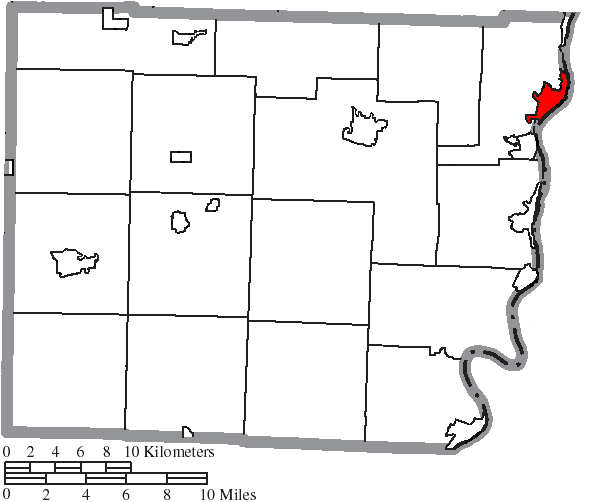
- Location of Martins Ferry in Belmont County

- Location within Ohio Location within the United States
- Coordinates: 40°07′10″N 80°43′05″W
- Country: United States
- State: Ohio
- County: Belmont
- Township: Pease
- Founded: 1835

Government
  - Type: Mayor-Council
  - Mayor: John Davies
  - Council President: Kristine Davis

Area
  - Total: 2.33 sq mi (6.04 km^{2})
  - Land: 2.33 sq mi (6.03 km^{2})
  - Water: 0 sq mi (0.00 km^{2})
- Elevation: 761 ft (232 m)

Population (2020)
  - Total: 6,260
  - Density: 2,688.5/sq mi (1,038.02/km^{2})
- Time zone: UTC-5 (Eastern (EST))
  - Summer (DST): UTC-4 (EDT)
- ZIP code: 43935
- Area code: 740
- FIPS code: 39-48104
- GNIS feature ID: 2395030
- Website: www.martinsferry.org

Martins Ferry is the most populous city in Belmont County, Ohio, United States. The population was 6,260 as of the 2020 census. Located along the Ohio River across from Wheeling, West Virginia, it is part of the Wheeling metropolitan area.

== History ==
Aerial view of Martins Ferry in 1899

Martins Ferry is the oldest European settlement in the state of Ohio, having been settled at least as early as 1779, almost a decade before Marietta. The settlement got its start as a consequence of a land grant to George Mercer of the Ohio Company in 1748 from the British Crown for 200,000 acres in the Ohio Country, a colloquial term for what is now much of Ohio, and western West Virginia and Pennsylvania. The grant called for among other things, establishment of a fort. The grant was for land south of the Ohio River in West Virginia (then Virginia). Settlement was hampered by the outbreak of the French and Indian War. The settlement was named Zanesburg (renamed Wheeling in 1795). The Ohio Company was dissolved in 1779, and claims issued by the Crown became moot after the Revolutionary War. The community across the river was a westward extension of Zanesburg, but at that time, settlement on the west bank of the Ohio River was prohibited by the Treaty of Fort Stanwix, 1768. Through the years, it has been known as Hoglinstown, Mercertown, Norristown (1785), Jefferson (1795), Martinsville (1835), and Martin's Ferry (1865).

Squatters from across the Ohio were the earliest settlers. The settlement formed in the shadow of Virginia's Fort Fincastle, later renamed Fort Henry on the Virginia side of the Ohio, built in 1774. The town was disbanded a couple of times before becoming established as Norristown in 1785. In 1795, the town of Jefferson was platted by Absalom Martin, one of the city's earliest settlers, who operated a ferry there. In 1801, he abandoned his plat when St. Clairsville was selected as the county seat of the newly organized county of Belmont, one of the founding territories of the Northwest Territory.

In 1835, Ebenezer Martin, the son of Absalom Martin, redesigned the town, which he called Martinsville, with a grid system of streets, much of which survives to this day. Martinsville remained an unincorporated settlement for a relatively long time. It was eventually incorporated as a village in 1865 and renamed Martin's Ferry for Ebenezer's father's ferry. It was chartered as a city in 1885, and sometime later the apostrophe was dropped from the city's name.

The city developed as an important industrial center during the late 19th century and early 20th century. It became an important rail hub and river port. Over the past 50 years, the town's population has decreased significantly as industries have closed or moved elsewhere. Today, the city's population is less than half of what it once was.

== Geography ==
According to the United States Census Bureau, the city has a total area of 2.33 square miles (6.03 km^{2}), all land.

The town is built on two basic plateaus between a hill and the Ohio River. The lower plateau, along the river, is dominated by a large industrial park, the Martins Ferry Football Stadium, and Ohio State Route 7 (a four-lane traffic artery that runs from north to south across eastern Ohio). The higher plateau, which is the larger of the two, is predominantly residential and commercial, and is home to most of the city's residents. It gradually rises to a steep hillside in the west that forms a natural wall.

Directly across the river lies the city of Wheeling, West Virginia, and to the east is the Pennsylvania state line. The city of Columbus is 125 miles (201 km) to the west, and Pittsburgh is 59 miles (95 km) northeast of the city. On the southern end of town, Martins Ferry is directly connected to the village of Bridgeport.

=== Climate ===
The climate in this area is characterized by hot, humid summers and dry, cold winter temperatures. According to the Köppen Climate Classification system, Martins Ferry has a Humid continental climate.

Climate data for Martins Ferry, Ohio
Month	Jan	Feb	Mar	Apr	May	Jun	Jul	Aug	Sep	Oct	Nov	Dec	Year
Mean daily maximum °C (°F)	4 (40)	5 (41)	11 (51)	17 (63)	23 (74)	28 (82)	30 (86)	29 (85)	26 (79)	20 (68)	12 (53)	6 (42)	18 (64)
Mean daily minimum °C (°F)	−6 (22)	−6 (22)	−2 (29)	3 (38)	9 (48)	14 (58)	17 (62)	16 (61)	12 (54)	6 (43)	1 (33)	−4 (25)	5 (41)
Average precipitation mm (inches)	74 (2.9)	64 (2.5)	91 (3.6)	86 (3.4)	94 (3.7)	99 (3.9)	94 (3.7)	89 (3.5)	84 (3.3)	64 (2.5)	69 (2.7)	69 (2.7)	980 (38.4)
Source: Weatherbase

== Demographics ==
Historical population
Census	Pop.	Note	%±
1860	1,220		—
1870	1,835		50.4%
1880	3,819		108.1%
1890	6,250		63.7%
1900	7,760		24.2%
1910	9,133		17.7%
1920	11,634		27.4%
1930	14,524		24.8%
1940	14,729		1.4%
1950	13,220		−10.2%
1960	11,919		−9.8%
1970	10,757		−9.7%
1980	9,304		−13.5%
1990	7,990		−14.1%
2000	7,226		−9.6%
2010	6,915		−4.3%
2020	6,260		−9.5%
2025 (est.)	6,048		−3.4%
U.S. Decennial Census

=== 2020 census ===
As of the 2020 census, Martins Ferry had a population of 6,260. The median age was 40.9 years. 21.9% of residents were under the age of 18 and 20.0% of residents were 65 years of age or older. For every 100 females there were 89.9 males, and for every 100 females age 18 and over there were 88.0 males age 18 and over.

100.0% of residents lived in urban areas, while 0.0% lived in rural areas.

There were 2,811 households in Martins Ferry, of which 26.8% had children under the age of 18 living in them. Of all households, 32.7% were married-couple households, 22.2% were households with a male householder and no spouse or partner present, and 35.4% were households with a female householder and no spouse or partner present. About 36.0% of all households were made up of individuals and 16.6% had someone living alone who was 65 years of age or older.

There were 3,329 housing units, of which 15.6% were vacant. The homeowner vacancy rate was 3.8% and the rental vacancy rate was 12.6%.

Racial composition as of the 2020 census
Race	Number	Percent
White	5,408	86.4%
Black or African American	323	5.2%
American Indian and Alaska Native	18	0.3%
Asian	10	0.2%
Native Hawaiian and Other Pacific Islander	0	0.0%
Some other race	29	0.5%
Two or more races	472	7.5%
Hispanic or Latino (of any race)	86	1.4%

=== 2010 census ===
As of the census of 2010, there were 6,915 people, 3,022 households, and 1,787 families residing in the city. The population density was 2,967.8 inhabitants per square mile (1,145.9/km^{2}). There were 3,431 housing units at an average density of 1,472.5 per square mile (568.5/km^{2}). The racial makeup of the city was 91.6% White, 5.6% African American, 0.3% Native American, 0.1% Asian, 0.2% from other races, and 2.2% from two or more races. Hispanic or Latino of any race 0.7% of the population.

There were 3,022 households, of which 27.3% had children under the age of 18 living with them, 38.2% were married couples living together, 16.1% had a female householder with no husband present, 4.9% had a male householder with no wife present, and 40.9% were non-families. 35.3% of all households were made up of individuals, and 15% had someone living alone who was 65 years of age or older. The average household size was 2.26 and the average family size was 2.89.

The median age in the city was 42.1 years. 21.3% of residents were under the age of 18; 9.2% were between the ages of 18 and 24; 23.5% were from 25 to 44; 28.9% were from 45 to 64; and 17.2% were 65 years of age or older. The gender makeup of the city was 46.8% male and 53.2% female.

=== 2000 census ===
During the census of 2000, there were 7,226 people, 3,202 households, and 1,959 families residing in the city. The population density was 3,345.1 inhabitants per square mile (1,291.6/km^{2}). There were 3,680 housing units at an average density of 1,703.6 per square mile (657.8/km^{2}). The racial makeup of the city was 93.19% White, 5.11% African American, 0.30% Native American, 0.04% Asian, 0.03% Pacific Islander, 0.22% from other races, and 1.11% from two or more races. Hispanic or Latino of any race were 0.64% of the population.

There were 3,202 households, out of which 26.5% had children under the age of 18 living with them, 42.2% were married couples living together, 15.5% had a female householder with no husband present, and 38.8% were non-families. 35.2% of all households were made up of individuals, and 19.1% had someone living alone who was 65 years of age or older. The average household size was 2.24 and the average family size was 2.86.

In the city, the population was spread out, with 22.4% under the age of 18, 7.2% from 18 to 24, 25.9% from 25 to 44, 24.1% from 45 to 64, and 20.3% who were 65 years of age or older. The median age was 41 years. For every 100 females, there were 84.1 males. For every 100 females age 18 and over, there were 78.5 males.

The median income for a household in the city was $23,960, and the median income for a family was $32,365. Males had a median income of $30,486 versus $21,979 for females. The per capita income for the city was $16,672. About 16.1% of families and 18.3% of the population were below the poverty line, including 28.6% of those under age 18 and 9.9% of those age 65 or over.

== Culture ==
There are 14 churches providing places of worship for Catholics, Baptists, Methodists, Nazarenes, Pentecostals, Presbyterians, Lutherans, Greek Orthodox Christians, Episcopalians and non-denominational Christians. There are also a number of clubs and organizations for veterans, ethnic groups and senior citizens.

The city has multiple cemeteries, including Riverview Cemetery, St. Mary's Catholic Cemetery and Walnut Grove Pioneer Cemetery. The latter is the burial place of local heroine, Betty Zane, who saved Fort Henry in Wheeling during one of the last battles of the American Revolutionary War by hiding gunpowder inside her dress. Her brother, Ebenezer Zane, who cut Zane's Trace from Wheeling to Maysville, Kentucky, opening the west for settlement, is also buried in Walnut Grove Pioneer Cemetery, along with Absalom and Ebenezer Martin and other important early settlers.

The volunteer fire department celebrates Betty Zane Frontier Days annually, in honor of American Revolutionary War participant Betty Zane.

In early spring, the city holds a Soap Box Derby.

== Education ==
The children of Martins Ferry are educated by the Martins Ferry City School District. Martins Ferry High School is located in and serves the city. In addition to the public school system, Martins Ferry is also served by two religious schools: St Mary's Catholic School and the Martins Ferry Christian School.

Martins Ferry has a public library, a branch of the Belmont County District Library.

== Notable people ==
- Joe DeNardo, Pittsburgh meteorologist
- Alex Groza, 1948 Summer Olympics gold medalist and star basketball player
- Lou Groza, Pro Football Hall of Fame kicker and offensive lineman with Cleveland Browns and Ohio State Buckeyes
- John Havlicek, Hall of Fame basketball player for Ohio State and Boston Celtics
- Cecil Hobbs, scholar of Southeast Asian history
- William Dean Howells, realist author
- Johnny Lipon, Major League Baseball infielder and Cleveland Indians manager
- Dan McGrew, professional football player (center) for Buffalo Bills
- Robert E. Murray, mining engineer and businessman
- Joe Niekro, Major League Baseball pitcher
- Phil Niekro, Major League Baseball pitcher inducted into Baseball Hall of Fame in 1997
- Tim Spencer, NFL and USFL football player, Tampa Bay Buccaneers running backs coach
- Charlie Wilson, politician who served as member of the U.S. House and Ohio General Assembly
- Jason Wilson, politician and former member of the Ohio Senate
- James Wright, Pulitzer Prize-winning poet and author
- Chad Brinker, professional football player (New York Jets) and NFL team president of football operations (Tennessee Titans)

== In popular culture ==
James Wright wrote Autumn Begins in Martins Ferry, Ohio. The James Wright Poetry Festival was held in Martins Ferry from 1981 to 2007.

== See also ==
- List of cities and towns along the Ohio River
