= Deep image =

School of poetry

Deep image is a school of poetry that, in general, employs resonant, stylized and heroic tone. Longer poems tend to be catalogues of free-standing images.

The school was initially defined in 1961 by U.S. poets Jerome Rothenberg and Robert Kelly in the second issue of the magazine Trobar, specifically to describe poetry written by Diane Wakoski, Clayton Eshleman, and themselves. Rothenberg was inspired by the Spanish cante jondo ("deep song"), especially the work of Federico García Lorca and by the symbolist theory of correspondences. The deep image group was short-lived in the manner that Kelly and Rothenberg defined.

It was later redeveloped by Robert Bly and used by many, such as Galway Kinnell and James Wright. The redevelopment relied on being concrete, not abstract, and to let the images make the experience and to let the images and experience generate the meanings. This new style of Deep Image tended to be narrative, but was often lyrical.
