= James Wright (poet) =

American poet (1927–1980)

- Born: James Arlington Wright; December 13, 1927; Martins Ferry, Ohio, U.S.
- Died: March 25, 1980 (aged 52); New York City, U.S.
- Education: Kenyon College (BA); University of Washington (MA, PhD)
- Occupation: Poet
- Spouse: Liberty Kardules (m. 1953; div. 1962) Edith Anne Crunk (m. 1967)
- Children: 2; Franz and Marshall
- Writing career
- Notable works: "Lying in a Hammock at William Duffy's Farm in Pine Island, Minnesota" and "A Blessing" from The Branch Will Not Break (1963)
- Literary movement: Deep image poetry

James Arlington Wright (December 13, 1927 – March 25, 1980) was an American lyric poet in the post-World War II decades. He often wrote about his experience of Depression-era poverty in the Midwest. His Collected Poems won the 1972 Pulitzer Prize for Poetry.

== Life ==
James Wright was born and raised in Martins Ferry, Ohio. His father, John Dudley Ira Wright, worked in a glass factory, and his mother, Jessie Lyons, in a laundry. Neither parent had received more than an eighth grade education. In 1943, James suffered a nervous breakdown, postponing his junior year in high school. After weeks in a psychiatric ward and months performing manual labor, he returned to school and graduated late in 1946. He then enlisted in the U.S. Army and participated in the occupation of Japan.

Following his discharge from military service, Wright attended Kenyon College on the GI Bill. He studied with John Crowe Ransom, and published poems in the Kenyon Review. Wright graduated Phi Beta Kappa in 1952. That same year, he married Liberty Kardules, another Martins Ferry native. He subsequently spent a year in Vienna on a Fulbright Fellowship, returning to the U.S. where he obtained a master's degree and a Ph.D. at the University of Washington; his faculty advisers were the poets Theodore Roethke and Stanley Kunitz.

Wright first emerged on the literary scene in 1956 with The Green Wall, a collection of formalist verse that was awarded the prestigious Yale Younger Poets Prize. By the early 1960s, he was increasingly influenced by the Spanish language surrealists, and dropped the use of fixed meters. His transformation achieved its maximum expression with the publication of the seminal The Branch Will Not Break (1963), which positioned Wright as curious counterpoint to the Beats and New York School poets. He became aligned with the Midwestern neo-surrealist and deep image poetics.

Wright's transformation did not come by accident, as he had been working for years with his friend Robert Bly, collaborating on the translation of world poets in the influential magazine, The Fifties (later The Sixties). Such influences fertilized Wright's unique perspective and helped put the Midwest back on the poetic map. He had discovered a terse, imagistic, free verse of clarity and power. During the next ten years, he would go on to pen some of his most frequently anthologized works, such as "A Blessing," "Autumn Begins in Martins Ferry, Ohio," and "I Am a Sioux Indian Brave, He Said to Me in Minneapolis."

Wright was a lifelong smoker, and was diagnosed in late 1979 with cancer of the tongue. He died a few months later in Calvary Hospital in the Bronx. His last book of new poems, This Journey, was published posthumously by Random House.

== Poetry ==
Wright's early poetry is relatively conventional in form and meter, especially compared with his later, looser work. Although most of his fame comes from his own poetry, he was also a prolific translator of other poets. He published translations of René Char's hermetic poems. His translations of modern German and Spanish poets, as well as his exposure to the aesthetic position and poetics of Robert Bly, had considerable influence on the evolution of Wright's poetry. This is most evident in The Branch Will Not Break, which departs from the formal style of his previous book, Saint Judas.

In his poetry, Wright often "allied himself...with the dispossessed and the outcast." Throughout his life, he suffered from clinical depression and bipolar mood disorders, and also battled alcoholism. He experienced several nervous breakdowns, was hospitalized, and was subjected to electroshock therapy. While his dark moods and focus on emotional suffering were often at the center of his poetry, his poems could be optimistic, expressing faith in life and human transcendence. In The Branch Will Not Break, the enduring human spirit becomes thematic. Nevertheless, the last line of his poem "Lying in a Hammock at William Duffy's Farm in Pine Island, Minnesota" famously reads, "I have wasted my life."

Technically, Wright was an innovator, especially in the use of his titles, first lines, and last lines, which he employed to great dramatic effect in defense of the marginalized. He is equally well known for his tender depictions of the bleak landscapes of the post-industrial American Midwest.

== Awards and legacy ==
Wright won the 1972 Pulitzer Prize for Poetry for his volume Collected Poems (1971).

Besides his various poetry awards, Wright was a recipient of a grant from the Rockefeller Foundation. He regularly corresponded with another Rockefeller grantee, the Catholic nun, literary critic and poet M. Bernetta Quinn.

After his death, Wright developed a cult following that regarded him as a seminal American poet. Fellow Pulitzer prize winner Mary Oliver wrote "Three Poems for James Wright" upon his death, and hundreds of writers gathered annually to pay tribute at the James Wright Poetry Festival held from 1981 through 2007 in Martins Ferry.

Wright's son Franz was also a poet, and he won the Pulitzer Prize for Poetry in 2004. James and Franz are believed to be the first parent/child pair to have won a Pulitzer Prize in the same category.

== Works ==
=== Published in his lifetime ===
- The Green Wall (Yale University Press, 1957)
- Saint Judas (Wesleyan University Press, 1959)
- The Branch Will Not Break (Wesleyan University Press, 1963)
- Shall We Gather at the River (Wesleyan University Press, 1967)
- Collected Poems (Wesleyan University Press, 1971)
- Two Citizens (Farrar, Straus and Giroux, 1973)
- Moments of the Italian Summer (Dryad Press, 1976)
- To a Blossoming Pear Tree (Farrar, Straus and Giroux, 1977)

=== Published posthumously ===
- This Journey (1982; completed in 1980)
- The Temple at Nîmes (1982)
- James Wright, In Defense Against This Exile. Letters To Wayne Burns., edited with an introduction by John R. Doheny (1985)
- Above the River, The Complete Poems, introduction by Donald Hall (Noonday Press, University Press of New England, and Wesleyan University Press, 1990). Included by Harold Bloom in his list of works constituting the Western Canon.
- Selected Poems (2005)
- A Wild Perfection: The Selected Letters of James Wright (2005)
- The Delicacy and Strength of Lace: Letters Between Leslie Marmon Silko and James Wright., edited by Anne Wright and Joy Harjo (2009)

== See also ==
- James Wright Poetry Festival
- Deep image
