= Zane's Trace =

Frontier road in the Northwestern Territory of the U.S.

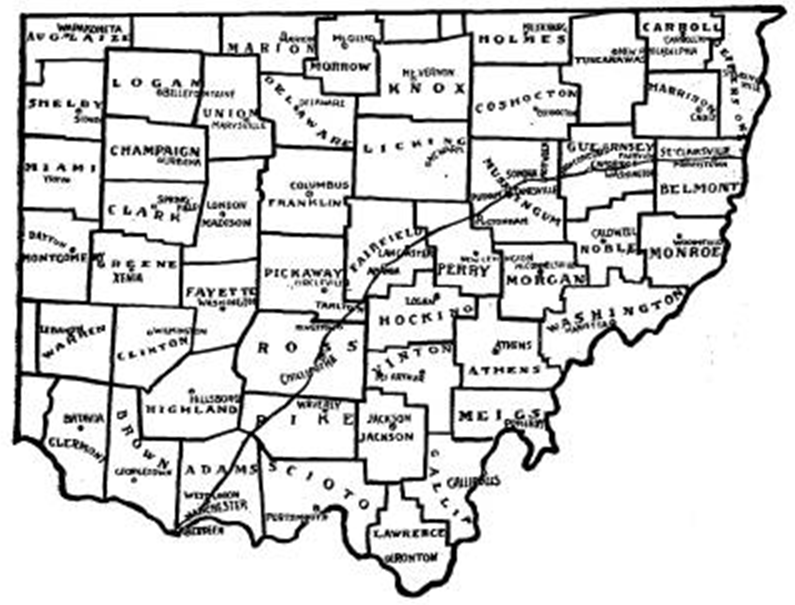
Zane's Trace is shown in southern Ohio.

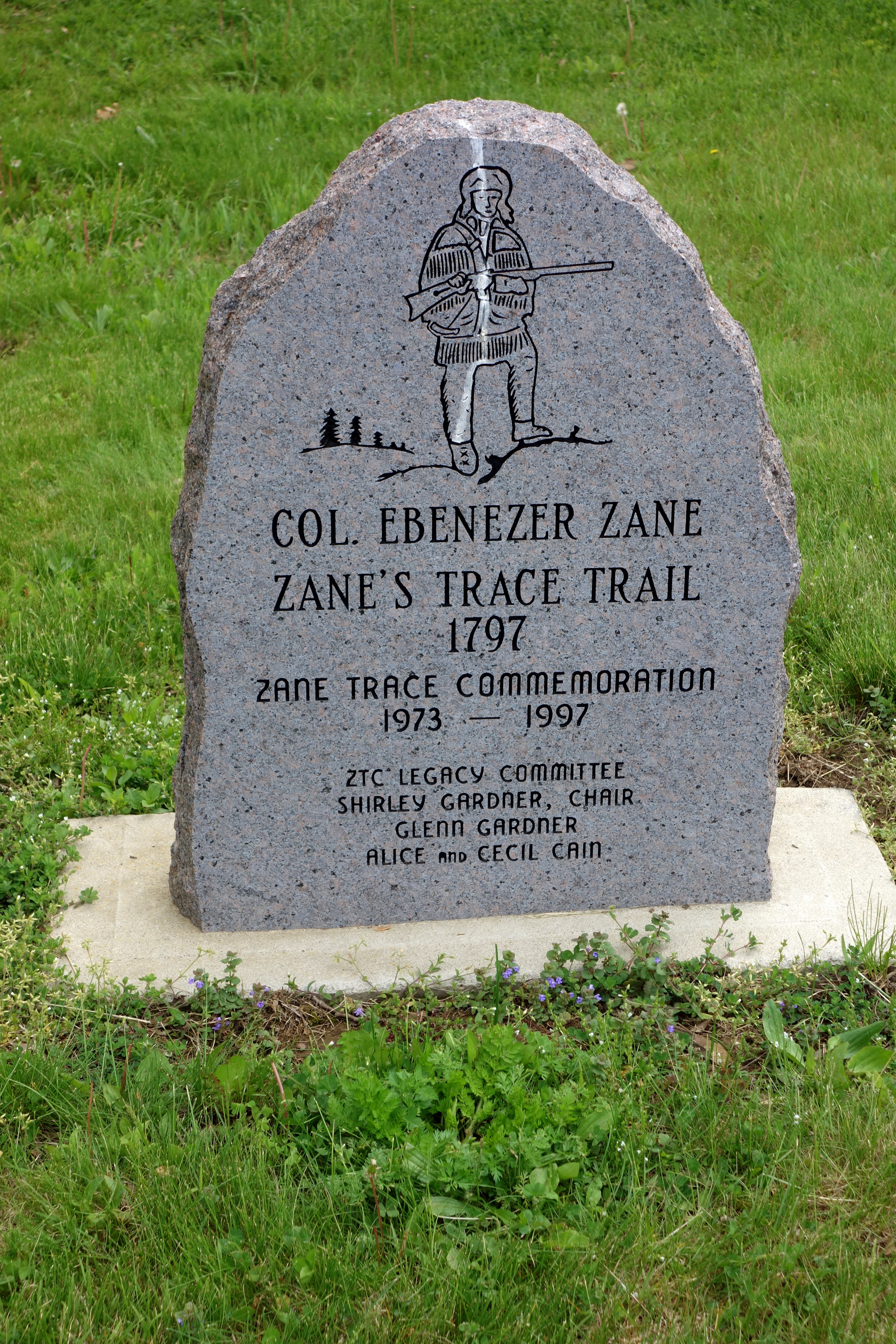
Ebenezer Zane, the namesake of the Trace commemorated on stone trail marker at National Road Museum in Norwich, Ohio

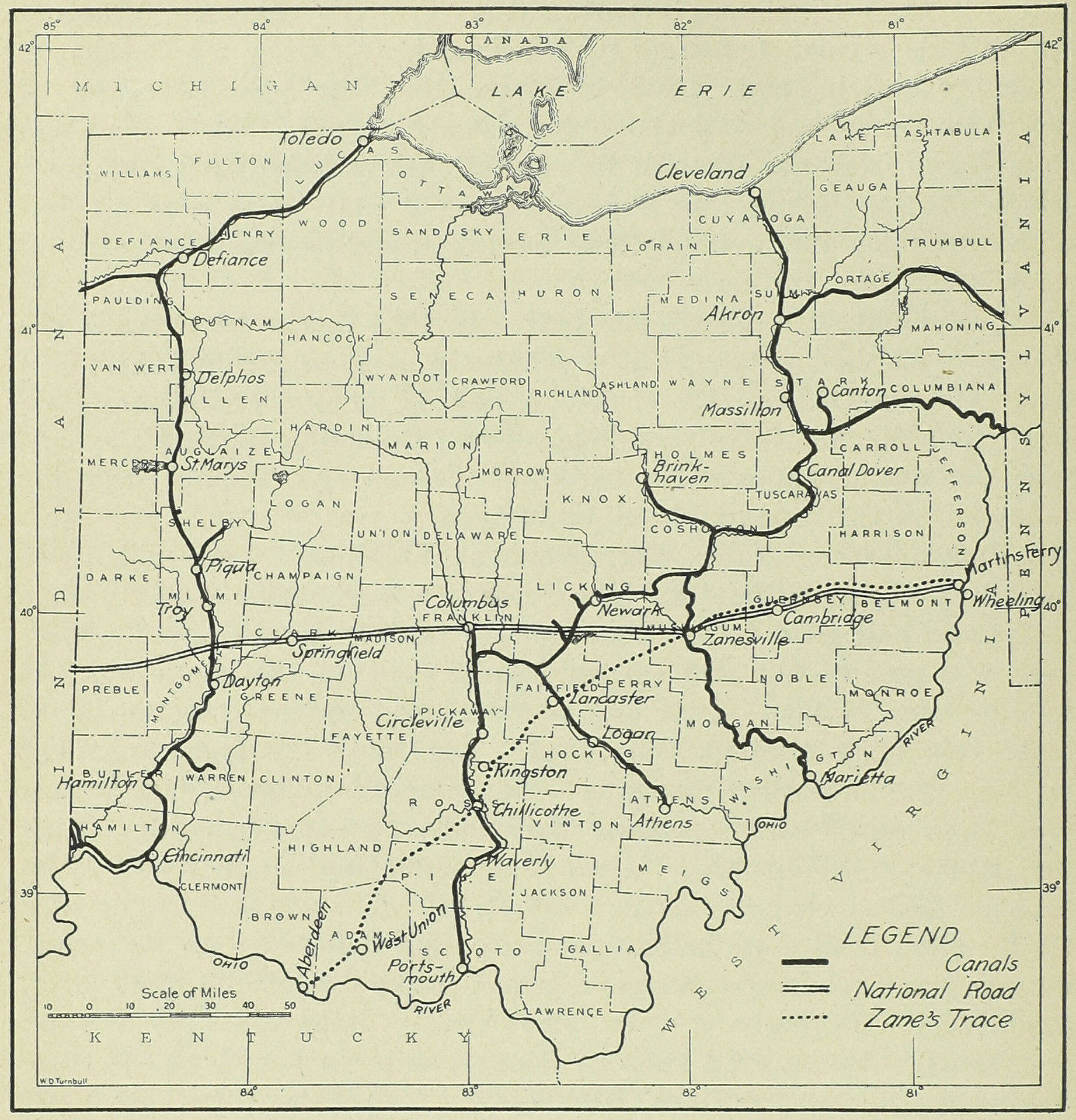
Map of Zane's Trace along with canals and the National Road in Ohio, 1923

Zane's Trace is a frontier road constructed under the direction of Col. Ebenezer Zane through the Northwest Territory of the United States, in what is now the state of Ohio. Many portions were based on traditional Native American trails. Constructed during 1796 and 1797, the road ran from Wheeling, Virginia (now Wheeling, West Virginia) to Maysville, Kentucky, through the portion of the Northwest Territory that eventually became the southeastern quarter of the state of Ohio. It was more than 230 miles (370 km) long and was interrupted by several rivers.

== Construction and later improvements ==
After serving in the Continental Army in the American Revolutionary War, Col. Zane traveled to Washington, D.C., in early 1796. He petitioned Congress for money to finance the construction of a road to encourage settlement in the Northwest Territory and speed up travel times to Kentucky. Zane would profit by construction of the road, both because he owned most of the land at its starting point of Wheeling, and also because he intended to buy tracts of land along the route (see below). Nonetheless, it was in the national interest for such a road to be built. Congress approved a contract financing the project in May 1796.

Col. Zane was assisted in overseeing the construction by his brother Jonathan Zane and his son-in-law John McIntire, as well as by a Native American guide Tomepomehala. Col. Zane took advantage of existing Native American trails for some of the route. These included the Mingo Trail in the area between present day Fairview, Ohio, and Zanesville, Ohio, and the Moxahala Trail in the area between present day Zanesville, Ohio, and Chillicothe, Ohio. Chillicothe was the only settlement already existent along the route before the Trace was constructed. The Trace was constructed through heavily forested, hilly terrain and was not easily traveled by wagon.

After Ohio became a state in 1803, the legislature levied a state transportation tax used in 1804 to improve the entirety of the Trace. Laborers cleared out stumps and widened the thoroughfare. Between 1825 and 1830, the segment of Zane's Trace between Wheeling and Zanesville was rebuilt as part of the new National Road.

== Crossing the rivers and streams ==
The rivers and streams along the Trace were first crossed by ford or ferry. Col. Zane ran a ferry across the Ohio River at Wheeling, where a bridge was not constructed until 1837. Ferries across Wills Creek in present-day Cambridge, Ohio, were run by Ezra Graham, George and Henry Beymer, and John Beatty. William McCulloch and Henry Crooks ran a ferry across the Muskingum River from Zanesville to Putnam, Ohio (now also a part of Zanesville). A bridge was built over the Muskingum River in 1813. A bridge was built over the Hocking River near Lancaster, Ohio, as early as 1809. Benjamin Urmston ran the ferry across the Scioto River at Chillicothe. Ferries ran across the Ohio River to Maysville, Kentucky. The town of Aberdeen, Ohio, was founded in 1816 on the Ohio side of the river. A bridge was not built connecting Aberdeen and Maysville until 1931.

== Colonel Zane's tracts ==
As part of his petition to Congress (see above), Col. Zane requested that he be given the right to buy select tracts of land at three sites where the Trace crossed a major river. The rivers were, from east to west, the Muskingum River, the Hocking River, and the Scioto River. Congress granted this request. General Rufus Putnam, surveyor general of the United States, surveyed the tracts, all of which were purchased by Col. Zane.

Col. Zane deeded the tract at the Muskingum River to his brother Jonathan Zane and to his son-in-law, John McIntire, on December 10, 1800. McIntire had already laid out a town named Westbourne in 1799, the name of which was changed by the postmaster to Zanesville in 1801.

Col. Zane divided his tract along the Hocking River into lots, and appointed his sons Noah Zane and John Zane as agents to sell the lots. A town was laid out here in 1800, and was named New Lancaster at the request of resident Emmanuel Carpenter Sr., in honor of his prior home of Lancaster, Pennsylvania. The town was renamed Lancaster in 1805 to avoid confusion with the town of New Lancaster, also in Pennsylvania.

Col. Zane's tract on the Scioto River was not as useful for development. The town of Chillicothe had already been settled on the west bank of the Scioto River, and land west of the Scioto River was reserved for Virginian veterans of the Revolutionary War. Col. Zane sold his tract of land on the eastern bank of the Scioto River to Humphrey Fullerton in 1804.
