= Diane Wakoski =

American poet (born 1937)

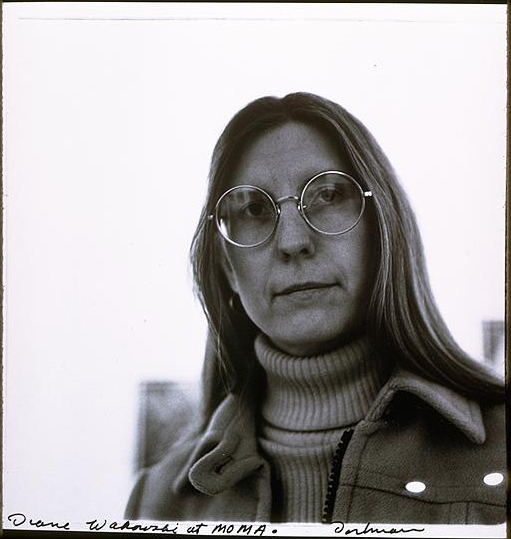
- Born: August 3, 1937 (age 89); Whittier, California, U.S.
- Occupations: Poet, essayist
- Writing career
- Genre: New American Poetry

Diane Wakoski (born August 3, 1937) is an American poet. Wakoski is primarily associated with the deep image poets, as well as the confessional and Beat poets of the 1960s. She received considerable attention in the 1980s for controversial comments linking New Formalism with Reaganism.

== Life and work ==
Wakoski was born in Whittier, California. She studied at the University of California, Berkeley where she graduated in 1960 with a Bachelor of Arts degree. During her time at Berkeley she participated in Thom Gunn's poetry workshops. It was there that she first read many of the modernist poets who would influence her writing style. Her early writings were considered part of the deep image movement that also included the works of Jerome Rothenberg, Robert Kelly, and Clayton Eshleman, among others. She also cites William Carlos Williams, Allen Ginsberg and Charles Bukowski as influences. Her poetry career began in New York City, where she moved with La Monte Young in 1960. She remained a resident of New York City until 1973. Her later work is more personal and conversational in the Williams mode. Wakoski is married to the photographer Robert Turney, and is University Distinguished Professor Emeritus at Michigan State University in East Lansing, Michigan.

Wakoski's literary works have been recognized and highlighted at Michigan State University in their Michigan Writers Series.

Her work has been published in more than twenty collections and many slim volumes of poetry. Her selected poems, Emerald Ice, won the William Carlos Williams Prize from the Poetry Society of America in 1989. In the preceding year, 1988, Wakoski was among three judges for that year's National Poetry Competition sponsored by The Chester H. Jones Foundation. She is best known for a series of poems collectively known as The Motorcycle Betrayal Poems. Many of her books have been published in fine editions by Black Sparrow Press. In 2022, Black Sparrow Press published an expanded edition of The Motorcycle Betrayal Poems titled Dancing on the Grave of a Son of a Bitch: The Complete Motorcycle Betrayal Poems. The new hardcover edition includes an introduction by Elizabeth A.I. Powell, additional poems, and an afterword by Wakoski.

== Awards ==
- William Carlos Williams Award for her book Emerald Ice.
- Guggenheim Foundation grant
- National Endowment for the Arts grant
- Fulbright Grant
- Pansy Award from The Society of Western Flowers

== Bibliography ==
=== Poetry ===
==== Collections ====
- Coins & Coffins. Hawk's Well Press. 1962.
- Discrepancies and Apparitions. Doubleday. 1966.
- The George Washington Poems. Riverrun Press. 1967.
- Inside the Blood Factory. Doubleday. 1968.
- Greed: Parts 1 & 2. Black Sparrow Press. 1968.
- Greed: Parts 3 & 4. Black Sparrow Press. 1969.
- The Magellanic Clouds. Black Sparrow Press. 1970.
- Greed: Parts 5 & 7. Black Sparrow Press. 1971.
- The Motorcycle Betrayal Poems. Simon and Schuster. 1971. ISBN 9780671210113.
- Smudging. Black Sparrow Press. 1972.
- Greed: Parts 8, 9, & 11. Black Sparrow Press. 1973.
- Dancing on the Grave of a Son of a Bitch. Black Sparrow Press. 1973. ISBN 978-0-87685-180-7.
- Trilogy: Coins & Coffins; Discrepancies and Apparitions; The George Washington Poems. Doubleday. 1974. ISBN 978-0-385-08910-4.
- The Fable of the Lion and the Scorpion. Pentagram Press. 1975.
- Virtuoso Literature for Two and Four Hands. Doubleday. 1975. ISBN 978-0-385-00532-6.
- Waiting for the King of Spain. Black Sparrow Press. 1976. ISBN 978-0-87685-293-4.
- The Man Who Shook Hands. Doubleday. 1978. ISBN 978-0-385-13407-1.
- Trophies. Black Sparrow Press. 1979.
- Cap of Darkness. Black Sparrow Press. 1980. ISBN 978-0-87685-455-6.
- The Magician's Feastletters. Black Sparrow Press. 1982.
- The Collected Greed: Parts 1-13. Black Sparrow Press. 1984. ISBN 978-0-87685-464-8.
- Why My Mother Likes Liberace: A Musical Selection. SUN/gemini Press. 1985.
- The Rings of Saturn. Black Sparrow Press. 1986. ISBN 978-0-87685-675-8.
- Emerald Ice: Selected Poems 1962-1987. Black Sparrow Press. 1988. ISBN 978-0-87685-746-5.
- Medea the Sorceress. Black Sparrow Press. 1991. ISBN 978-0876858103
- Jason the Sailor. Black Sparrow Press. 1993. ISBN 978-0-87685-902-5.
- The Emerald City of Las Vegas. Black Sparrow Press. 1995. ISBN 978-0-87685-971-1.
- Argonaut Rose. Black Sparrow Press. 1998. ISBN 978-1-57423-046-8.
- The Butcher's Apron: New & Selected Poems. Black Sparrow Press. 2000. ISBN 978-1-57423-144-1.
- The Diamond Dog. Anhinga Press. 2010. ISBN 978-1934695159
- Bay of Angels. Anhinga Press. 2013. ISBN 978-1934695326
- Lady of Light. Anhinga Press. 2018. ISBN 978-1934695586
- Dancing on the Grave of a Son of a Bitch: The Complete Motorcycle Betrayal Poems. Black Sparrow Press. 2022. ISBN 978-1-57423-255-4.

=== List of poems ===
Title	Year	First published	Reprinted/collected
"Oysters with lemon in Montmartre"	2011	Wakoski, Diane (Spring 2011). "Oysters with lemon in Montmartre". Fifth Wednesday Journal.	Henderson, Bill, ed. (2013). The Pushcart Prize XXXVII : best of the small presses 2013. Pushcart Press. pp. 469–470.

=== Non-fiction ===
- Wakoski, Diane (1980). Towards a new poetry. University of Michigan Press.
