= Betty Zane =

Soldier in the American Revolutionary War

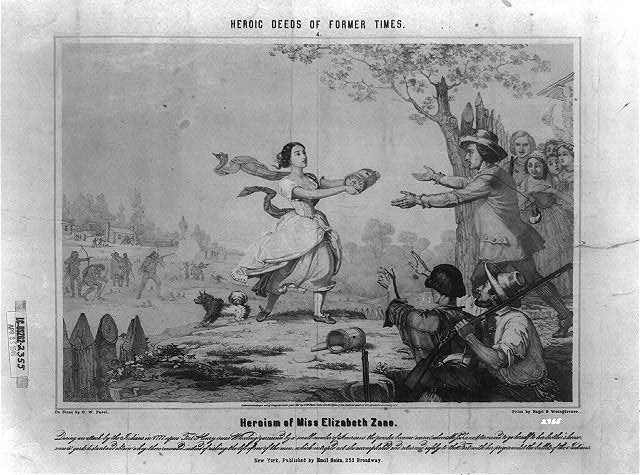
- A 19th-century depiction of Elizabeth Zane's legendary feat of retrieving powder during the 1782 siege of Fort Henry
- Born: July 19, 1765; Berkeley County, Province of Virginia, British America
- Died: August 23, 1823 (aged 58); St. Clairsville, Ohio, U.S.
- Spouses: Ephraim McLaughlin; Jacob Clark
- Children: Minerva Catherine Zane with Van Swearingen; Mary Ann "Polly", Sarah Nancy, Rebecca McLaughlin and Hannah McLaughlin with Ephraim McLaughlin; Ebenezer Clark and Catherine Clark with Jacob Clark
- Parent(s): William Andrew Zane; Nancy Ann Zane
- Relatives: Ebenezer Zane, brother Silas Zane, brother Jonathan Zane, brother

Elizabeth Zane McLaughlin Clark (July 19, 1765 – August 23, 1823) was involved in the American Revolutionary War on the American frontier. She was the daughter of William Andrew Zane and Nancy Ann (née Nolan) Zane, and sister to Ebenezer Zane, Silas Zane, Jonathan Zane, Isaac Zane and Andrew Zane.

== Biography ==
Three of the Zane brothers — Ebenezer, Silas and Jonathan — migrated from Moorefield, Hardy County, Virginia in 1769 and founded the first settlement at Wheeling, Ohio County, Virginia. The rest of the Zane family joined them later at the new settlement.

The Zane family later settled in what became Martins Ferry, Belmont County, Ohio, across the Ohio River from Wheeling, and played an important role during Ohio's formative years.

== The Siege of Fort Henry ==
In 1782 Native American and Loyalist forces attacked the small garrison of Fort Henry (modern-day Wheeling, West Virginia). Under the command of Colonel David Shepard of the Ohio Militia, the fort was defended by forty-two soldiers. According to a historical marker in Wheeling, on September 11, 1782, the Zane family fell under siege in Fort Henry by Native American allies of the British. During the siege, whilst Betty was loading a Kentucky rifle, her father was wounded and fell from the top of the fort, landing in front of her. The fort captain stated: "We have lost two men, one Mr. Zane and another gentleman, and we need black gunpowder."

Remembering a barrel of black powder in her brother's nearby home, Zane volunteered to make the trek, noting that "should she fall she'd be less missed than a man". Whether it is bravery or internalized chauvinism is unclear. She faced no difficulties retrieving the barrel, but became a prime target for gunfire on the return trip. Remarkably, she evaded all bullets and delivered the powder unscathed.

== Personal life ==
Elizabeth "Betty" Zane was married twice and was a mother of seven children.

Before her first marriage, she and a man named Capt. Van Swearingen bore a daughter: Minerva Catherine Zane, also known as Miriam. Court records in Ohio County, Virginia, show an order for Van Swearingen to deed property to Betty Zane, so the daughter would be provided for and not become a burden on the county.

Zane's first husband was Ephraim McLaughlin with whom she had four daughters; Mary Ann "Polly", Sarah Nancy, Rebecca and Hannah McLaughlin. After the death of her first husband, she married Jacob Clark with whom she had a son, Ebenezer Clark, and a daughter, Catherine Clark.

She is buried in what is now the Walnut Grove Pioneer Cemetery in Martins Ferry, Ohio. Each year during Betty Zane Pioneer Days, her heroism is honored.

== Legacy ==
The community of Betty Zane near Wheeling, West Virginia, was named after her.

More than one hundred years after her death, John S. Adams wrote a poem called "Elizabeth Zane", achieving some acclaim.

Betty Zane's great-grandnephew, the author Zane Grey, wrote a historical novel about her, titled Betty Zane, also republished as The Last Ranger. One of the main events in the story is the tale of Zane's fetching supplies from the family cabin. When Grey could not find a publisher for the book, he published it himself in 1903 using his wife's money. Grey later named his daughter Betty Zane after his aunt.

== See also ==
- Siege of Fort Henry (1782)
