= Siege of Fort Henry (1777) =

1777 battle of the American Revolutionary War

- Part of the American Revolutionary War
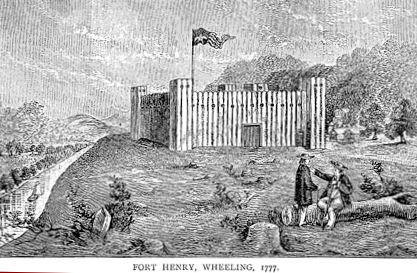
- Illustration of Fort Henry
Date	September 1 or September 21, 1777
Location	Fort Henry, Ohio Country 40°03′50″N 80°43′30″W
Result	Inconclusive

Belligerents
United States	Wyandot; Mingo; Shawnee; Lenape

Commanders and leaders
David Shepherd; Joseph Ogle; Samuel Mason	Buckongahelas; Dunquat

Strength
Under 100, plus 54 reinforcements	200 – 300 Natives

Casualties and losses
23 killed (14 militia, 9 civilians); 5 wounded	1 killed 9 wounded

The siege of Fort Henry was an attack on American militiamen during the American Revolutionary War near the Virginia outpost known as Fort Henry by a multi-tribal alliance in September 1777. The fort, named for Virginia Governor Patrick Henry, was at first defended by only a small number of militia, as rumors of an Indigenous raid had moved much faster than the warriors themselves, and a number of militia companies had left the fort. The remaining militia were successful in repulsing the attack.

== Background ==
In the summer of 1777, rumors began circulating throughout frontier areas of Virginia and Pennsylvania that Indigenous tribes living in the Ohio Country were planning attacks on frontier settlements south of the Ohio River. Fort Henry, which had been constructed in 1774 to protect the settlers in the area around what is now Wheeling, West Virginia, was one of the rumored targets.

In early August, General Edward Hand, the region's commander at Fort Pitt, warned militia Lieutenant Colonel David Shepherd and all of the local militia captains of the threat, and ordered 11 militia companies to gather at Fort Henry. At least six companies arrived totalling over 350 men. Minor skirmishes near Fort Henry took place in early August resulting in two enslaved men wounded and one Indigenous warriors killed.

For a time thereafter, militia companies stayed at Fort Henry, improving its defenses and patrolling for Indigenous warriors. However, the absence of any major threat led many of those companies to leave and return to their homes. By the end of August, only Captain Joseph Ogle's 25 man company from Buffalo Creek and the fort's local militia under Captain Samuel Mason remained.

== Prelude ==
Some sources report that the main attack happened on September 1, while others report September 21. On the night of the battle, a multi tribal alliance of a few hundred Indigenous warriors approached the fort in great stealth and secrecy. The warriors were predominantly Wyandot and Mingo, although there were also some Shawnee and Lenape). They were led by the Wyandot Chief Dunquat and the Lenape Chief Buckongahelas Local men later from Fort Shepherd (in Elm Grove) and Fort Holliday arrived to help defend the fort before it was invested. The total number of defenders on the first day varies by accounts from 42 to just under 100 militia. This is likely because accounts of the battle were recorded after the war and the local militiamen arrived sporadically alongside civilians taking refuge.

== Battle and aftermath ==
When four men left the fort early that morning, the Indigenous warriors ambushed them, killing one. The other three escaped, including two who returned to the fort to raise the alarm.

On hearing of the attack, Captain Mason marched out of the fort to search for the Indigenous warriors. However, Dunquat and Buckongahelas anticipated a sortie and had set up an ambush. One of Mason's men, Thomas Glen (sic), spotted a warrior and shot him, prompting the rest to open fire. Seeing that they were very nearly surrounded, Mason and his men retreated, with Mason suffering severe enough injuries that he was forced to hide by the path rather than go to the fort. When Ogle led some men out to assist, his party was also attacked, and he was forced to take cover. Despite taking casualties, he and Mason were eventually able to retreat to the fort.

Shortly after the siege began, calls for help went out to militias throughout the region. Captain Van Swearingen was the first to respond with fourteen men from Cross Creek, about 20 miles north, and was able to enter the fort without issue. The second to respond was Major Samuel McColloch, who led a force of 40 men from Fort Van Meter along Short Creek to assist the besieged Fort Henry. As his men approached the fort, they were also ambushed. While covering his men's safe retreat into the fort, McCollock found himself cut off.

Riding his horse, McColloch fled up Wheeling Hill, and there he found himself surrounded by the enemy on three sides, and on the other by a steep 300 feet (91 m) drop. Instead of being captured or killed, he chose to charge his horse over the edge of the cliff managing to save both himself and his horse without injury, and becoming a local folk hero for the story which has become known as McColloch's Leap.

Dunquat and Buckongahelas's warriors remained overnight outside the fort, dancing and demonstrating, but never attacked it directly. They departed the next morning after McColloch's reinforcements arrived, having suffered nine wounded and one killed, while the Americans lost 23 people (14 or 15 of whom were militia men and eight or nine were local civilians), along with five wounded. Over the course of the raid, the Indigenous force burned approximately 25 surrounding cabins and slaughtered or stole 300 cattle.

Following the Revolutionary War, Captain Samuel Mason would later turn to a life of crime as a river pirate in 1797 at Cave-In-Rock on the Ohio River and a highwayman on the Natchez Trace.
