= Fort Henry (West Virginia) =

Military base in Wheeling, West Virginia, USA

Coordinates: 40°03′50″N 80°43′30″W

Fort Henry (Fort Fincastle)
- Wheeling, West Virginia
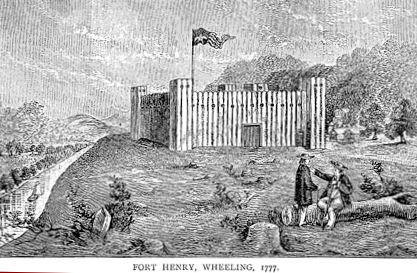

Site information
- Type: stockade
- Controlled by: Colony of Virginia and Virginia

Site history
- Built: 1774
- In use: 1774–1784
- Battles/wars: Lord Dunmore's War; American Revolutionary War: First Battle of Fort Henry (1777); Second Battle of Fort Henry (1782)

Fort Henry was a colonial fort which stood about ¼ mile from the Ohio River in what is now downtown, Wheeling, West Virginia. The fort was originally known as Fort Fincastle and was named for Viscount Fincastle, Lord Dunmore, Royal Governor of Virginia. Later it was renamed for Patrick Henry, and was at the time located in Virginia. The fort was subject to two major sieges, two notable feats (McColloch's Leap and Betty Zane's trek through the battle) and other skirmishes.

== History ==
Built in June 1774, Fort Henry was not erected by any specific plan or design, but was one of a number of similar forts built to protect settlers on the frontier in the middle years of the 1770s. The outbreak of Lord Dunmore's War, a conflict between American Indians of the Ohio Country and Virginia, was the immediate reason for its construction.

Construction was supervised by Colonel William Crawford under the orders of the Royal Governor of Virginia, Lord Dunmore.

It would appear that the need for a fortified shelter was noticed simultaneously by the residents of the area, and by the military authorities at Fort Pitt (Pennsylvania), in the spring of 1774. John Connolly wrote to the settlers at Zanesburg and urged them to fortify themselves as soon as possible.

Ebenezer Zane and John Caldwell began the fort, which was completed with the help of Captain William Crawford, Colonel Angus McDonald and 400 militia and regulars from Fort Pitt (Pennsylvania). A letter preserved in the Pennsylvania Archives shows that Connolly told Crawford "to proceed to Zanesburg and complete the fort."

A letter from Lord Dunmore dated June 20, 1774 to Connolly states that Dunmore "entirely [approved] of the measures [Connolly] have taken to build a fort at Wheeling." Dunmore, then, did not specifically order the fort to be built, but did approve of it. Connolly, according to some accounts, left Fort Pitt with 100 men to help build the fort, but was harassed by a small raiding party of Indians. He returned to Fort Pitt, and then sent out Crawford and McDonald with 400 men.

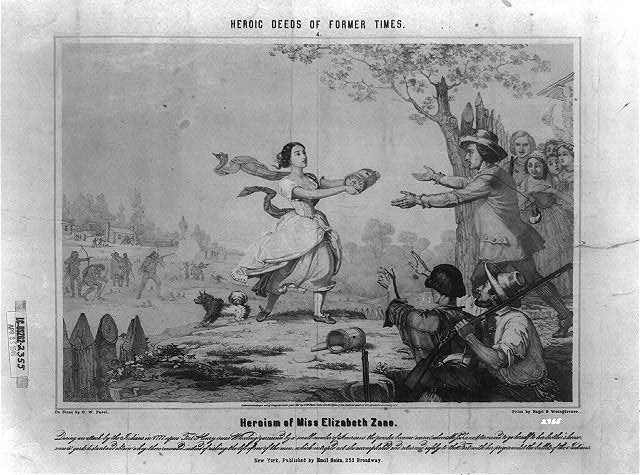
A 19th century depiction of Elizabeth Zane's legendary feat, of retrieving gunpowder, during the 1782 siege of Fort Henry

== Form ==
The fort enclosed about 0.5 acres (0.20 ha) and was defended on three sides by the topography. On the south and west (river) sides, the bluff prevented or greatly hindered assaults. On the north, the ravine provided protection. The only level ingress would have been from the east. Zane's blockhouse protected the entrance since attackers had to pass by it to attack the fort. They would have been caught in a crossfire between the fort and the blockhouse. All of the recorded attacks on Fort Henry came from the east.

The outer palisade wall was made of timbers, with blockhouses built at each of the four corners. In 1781 a two-story log structure was added near the front gate on which a cannon was mounted.

== American Revolutionary War ==
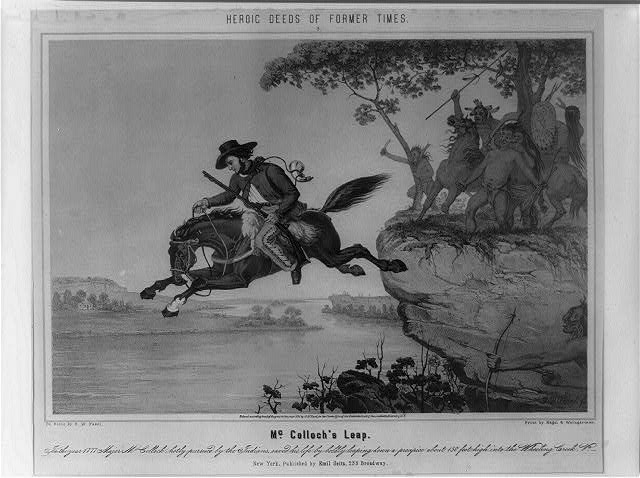
"McColloch's Leap"

The fort was besieged twice during the American Revolutionary War, once in 1777 and again in 1782.

=== First Siege of Fort Henry ===
In 1777, Native Americans of the Shawnee, Wyandot and Mingo tribes joined to attack colonial settlements along the Ohio River. Local men later joined by recruits from Fort Shepherd (in Elm Grove) and Fort Holliday defended the fort. The native force subsequently burned the surrounding cabins and destroyed livestock. Major Samuel McColloch led a small force of men from Fort Vanmetre along Short Creek to assist the besieged Fort Henry. McColloch was separated from his men and was chased by attacking Indians. Upon his horse, McColloch charged up Wheeling Hill and made what is known as McColloch's Leap 300 feet (91 m) down its eastern side to safety. The Indians rushed to the edge, expecting to see the Major lying dead in a crumpled heap at the bottom of the hill. To their great surprise they instead saw McColloch, still mounted on his white horse, galloping away from them.

=== Second Siege of Fort Henry ===
In 1782, an Indian force along with some Loyalist soldiers attempted to capture Fort Henry. During this siege, Fort Henry's supply of ammunition was exhausted. The defenders decided to dispatch one of its men to secure more ammunition from the Zane homestead. Betty Zane volunteered for the dangerous task. During her departing run, she was heckled by both the Indians and Loyalists. Upon successfully reaching the Zane homestead, she gathered a tablecloth and filled it with gunpowder. During her return, she was fired upon but was uninjured. It is believed that one bullet did, in fact, pierce her clothing. As a result of Zane's heroism, Fort Henry remained in American control. Numerous other skirmishes took place nearby.

== Disposition ==
The fort was dismantled soon after the end of the Revolutionary War, though some parts of it remained standing until 1808. In 1793, General Anthony Wayne built a blockhouse on the site for relay and storage as he moved his troops down the Ohio River prior to his Ohio Country campaign. Today the site is covered by city streets of Wheeling.

== See also ==
- Samuel Mason
