= Yellow Creek massacre =

1774 massacre of Mingo Indians in Virginia, US

- Part of Lord Dunmore's War
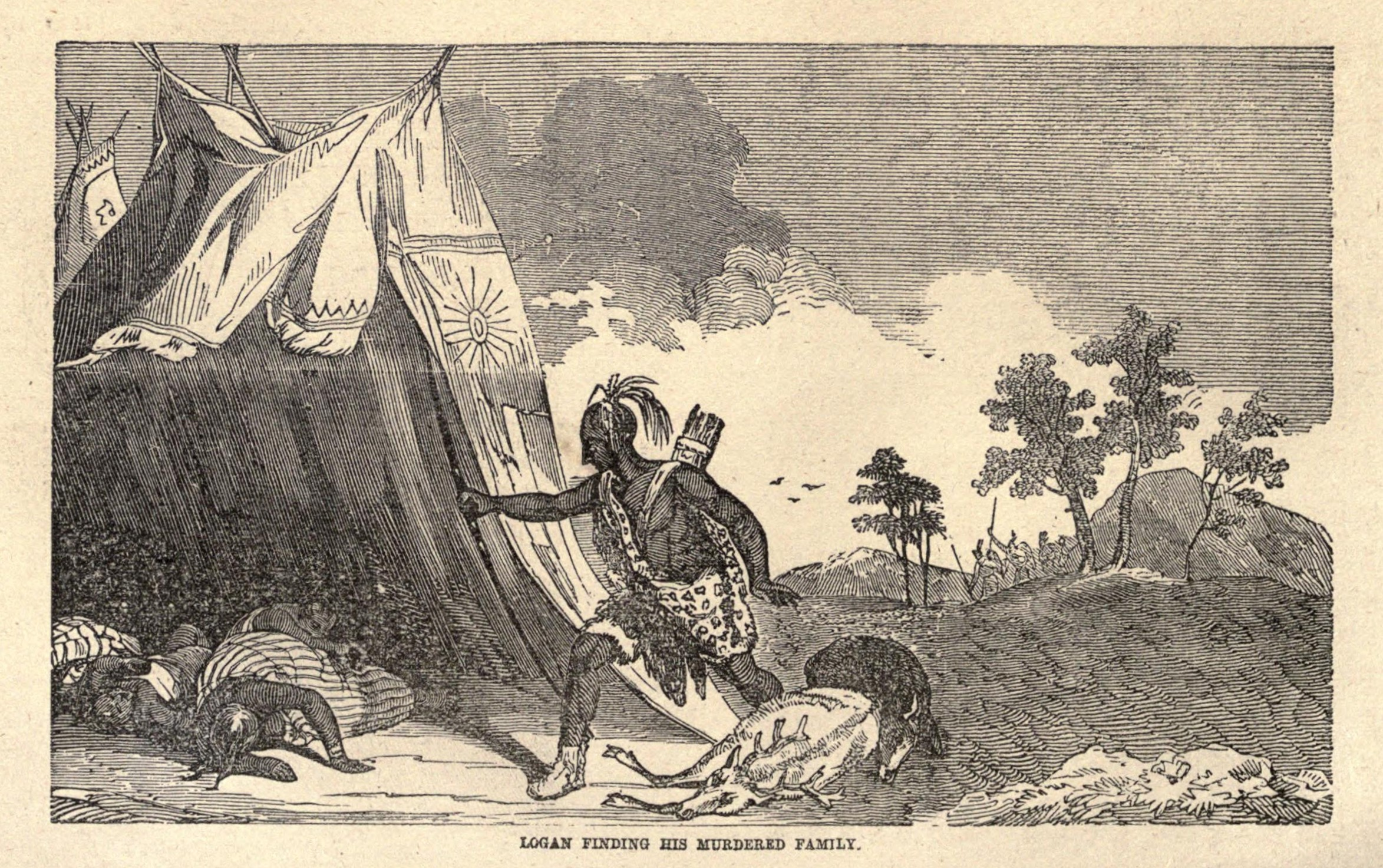
- Illustration from Frost, Pictorial History of Indian Wars (1873)
- Date: April 30, 1774
- Attack type: ambush
- Weapon: muskets
- Deaths: 9-13
- Victim: Mingo
- Assailant: Virginian settlers

The Yellow Creek massacre was a killing of several (Note: Parkinson writes that 9 were killed and another badly wounded (page 100), while Calloway says 13 were killed (pg. 107)) Mingo Indians by Virginian settlers on April 30, 1774. The massacre occurred across from the mouth of the Yellow Creek on the upper Ohio River in the Ohio Country, near the current site of the Mountaineer Casino, Racetrack and Resort. It was the single most important incident contributing to the outbreak of Lord Dunmore's War (May–October 1774). It was carried out by a group led by Jacob Greathouse and Daniel Greathouse. Daniel Greathouse died of measles the following year, and Jacob Greathouse was killed in an ambush in 1777. The other perpetrators were never brought to justice.

The ramifications of the massacre proved more severe because Mingo leader Logan maintained friendly relationships with Virginian settlers in the region. Chief Logan was away on a hunt, but his wife Mellana, his brother Taylaynee (called John Petty by the Virginian settlers), Taylaynee's son Molnah and their sister Koonay were among those killed in the massacre. Koonay was also the wife of John Gibson, a prominent American trader operating between the Virginian settlers and various Native American groups.

== Background ==
In 1774, tensions were high between the Native American nations of the Ohio valley and settlers from Pennsylvania and Virginia. Small attacks between them occurred, and rumors of open war spread. Along the Ohio River, two parties led by George Rogers Clark and Michael Cresap met on their way to Kentucky. In reaction to the rumors of war, they elected Cresap as their military captain, and made plans to hunt for Native Americans. Cresap talked them out of this plan, for fear that they would appear to have started the war.

While near Wheeling Creek, Cresap received a message from John Connolly at Fort Pitt, asking the travellers to remain in the area in case war broke out. Another message asked them to provide protection until settlers could fortify themselves, which Cresap understood to mean war had begun. Hearing that day that two residents had been killed, some of Cresap's men set out and killed two Native Americans.

Distrustful of all Native Americans and of representatives from Pennsylvania, the Kentucky-bound group set out the next day to overtake a canoe carrying 3 occupants. Led by Cresap and Ebenezer Zane, they killed a Lenape and a Shawnee who were both employed by William Butler. The 3rd occupant, a white trader named Stephens, was released, and reported the incident to Alexander McKee.

On 27 April 1774, a party of seven canoes was attacked by Cresap's men. One Native American was killed and one of Cresap's men was wounded, but Cresap was able to gather a large amount of plunder, included what Clark described as "a considerable quantity of ammunition and other warlike stores."

With two attacks committed against Native Americans within days, tensions were high. According to Clark, the party decided on 28 April that they would attack a Mingo camp at nearby Yellow Creek. Cresap was unable to dissuade this group from their plan. At a riverbank gathering of travelers, which included Angus McDonald, Matthew Elliott, and John Gibson, Cresap told Gibson that he would take his group to Red Stone "to avoid the consequences."

== Massacre ==
Different versions of the massacre spread within days of the event. By one account, Logan's sister frequently crossed the river to visit with Lucy Baker. In other accounts, the Greathouse group lured the Mingo group under Taylaynee to the house of Joshua Baker, near Yellow Creek, with a promise of liquor and a chance to play some sport. They then sprung an ambush on the Mingos and massacred them with musket fire. Another six Mingo later came looking for their missing friends, and were also killed. After the killings many of the bodies were mutilated. In a particularly brutal killing, Jacob Greathouse strung Koonay up by the wrists, sliced open her abdomen, removed her unborn baby, and impaled it on a stake. In other accounts, Greathouse scalped the fetus after cutting it from Koonay's body. The only member of the first group who was not killed was Koonay's two-month-old daughter. The child was eventually returned to the care of her father, John Gibson, after she had for a time been in the care of William Crawford.

With three massacres in just four days, war seemed imminent. According to Rev. David Zeisberger, the perpetrators "soon fled and left the poor settlers as victims to the Indians."

== Aftermath ==
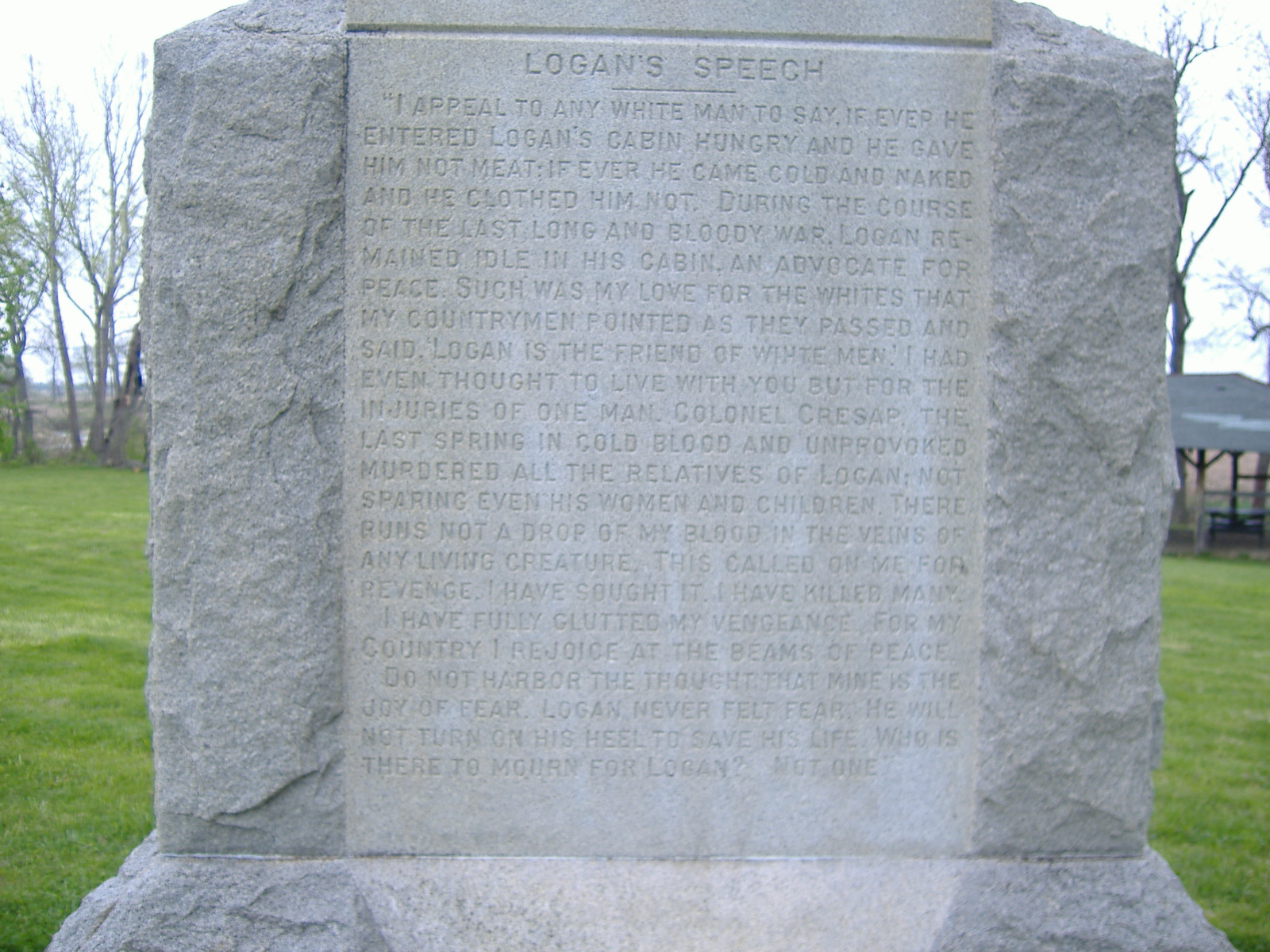
Logan's Lament

When Alexander McKee heard news of Cresap's first two attacks, he sent an urgent message to cease any further hostilities. He also invited Native American chiefs to Fort Pitt for a council to avoid a war. The day after the massacre, Virginian and Pennsylvanian settlers poured in at Fort Pitt. Commandant John Connolly called up the militia, and confiscated trade guns to arm it. He also put all inhabitants to work repairing the neglected fort.

After the massacre, some Native American leaders met to de-escalate the tensions. Within a week of the event, condolences and gifts were offered to the Haudenosaunee, Shawnee, and Lenape nations by McKee, Connolly, and George Croghan. Logan, however, claimed the right to retaliate. He led at least one retaliatory party, and several other Mingo and Shawnee parties also raided American settlers. John Murray, 4th Earl of Dunmore, Governor of Virginia, responded by launching an expedition against the Mingos and Shawnees, initiating Lord Dunmore's War.

Daniel Greathouse died of measles in 1775. Jacob Greathouse was killed in the ambush of William Foreman Company in September 1777. Their brother Jonathan Greathouse was killed 1791 while moving his family west. They were abducted by Native Americans on the Ohio River.

An article known as "Logan's Lament" was published in The Virginia Gazette in 1775. In part, it read: "Col. Cresap, the last spring, in cold blood, and unprovoked, murdered all the relations of Logan, not sparing even my women and children. There runs not a drop of my blood in the veins of any living creature. … Who is there to mourn for Logan? — Not one.” The lament was said to have been witnessed and translated by John Gibson.

The massacre, as well as Logan's Lament, was mentioned in Thomas Jefferson's Notes on the State of Virginia. Jefferson initially named Cresap as the person who murdered Logan's family, but corrected this information in an appendix of his 1800 edition. In 1798, a neighbor claimed that the Virginian party "appeared to have lost … sentiments of humanity as well as the effects of civilization."

The Yellow Creek Massacre provides the background for John Neal's 1822 fiction novel Logan.
