= Logan's War =

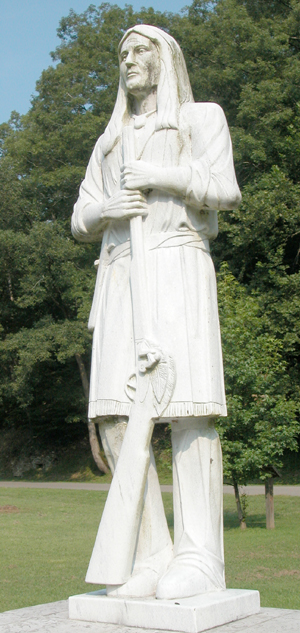
- Logan
| Date | 1774 |
| Location | Ohio River |
| Result | Lord Dunmore's War |

Belligerents
| Mingo, Shawnee | Colony of Virginia | Province of Pennsylvania |

Commanders and leaders
| Logan | John Connolly | Arthur St. Clair |

Logan's War was a 1774 retribution campaign or "mourning war" led by Mingo leader Logan in retaliation for the Yellow Creek massacre. Lord Dunmore's War was a direct result of Logan's campaign.

On 30 April 1774, several members of a Mingo village were lured to the house of Joshua Baker, near Yellow Creek in the modern state of Ohio. The Mingo were killed and scalped by Virginian settlers. Victims included the mother, brother, and pregnant sister of Logan.

The perpetrators fled to Virginia. Logan, who spoke English and was considered friendly to colonists, was unable to enact vengeance against those who killed his family, so he launched a retaliatory campaign against Virginians. Logan went to Wakatomika and asked for support; although the chiefs desired to stay neutral, Logan left with volunteers. Many settlers from Virginia and Pennsylvania fled in fear. In early June, Logan and his party attacked the farmstead of William and Lydia Spicer, killing the entire family except for two children, whom Logan left with a warning.

== Colonial Response ==
During this time, the British government and military forces in North America were preoccupied by unrest in Massachusetts, and the area around Fort Pitt was subject to a border dispute between the Colony of Virginia and the Province of Pennsylvania. Many Native Americans and Pennsylvanians blamed the Virginians for the outbreak in violence. Arthur St. Clair, Pennsylvania's representative at Fort Pitt, downplayed the danger to Pennsylvanians, and pledged his colony's support for peace with the local nations. St. Clair also directed Pennsylvania rangers to avoid disputes with Virginians.

By contrast, John Connolly, Virginia's commandant at Fort Pitt, impressed settlers to serve in the militia and repair Fort Pitt. He also seized rifles from local traders to arm the militia. Logan's party remained along the Monongahela River attacking Virginia settlers. Connolly dispatched a hundred militia members from Fort Pitt to find Logan's party. Although Logan managed to evade them, the militia recovered several captives, horses, and stolen property.

On 25 May 1774, Lenape chief White Eyes arrived at Fort Pitt from a diplomatic mission to the Ohio nations. The Lenape had pledged to remain peaceful. But Shawnee leader Cornstalk insisted that revenge against Virginia was required. He said that if the Virginians expected the Shawnee to ignore the "act of a few desperate young men" at Yellow Creek, then Virginia should similarly ignore "what our Young Men are now doing, or shall do against your People." Various nations, including Cornstalk's Shawnee, provided safe housing and escorts to white traders so they could pass safely.

A company of 40 soldiers under Captain Francis McClure was en route to join Virginian forces assembling at Wheeling, when they were ambushed by a group of Native Americans on 11 June 1774, at the top of a steep ascent near Tenmile Creek. McClure was killed, and his Lieutenant wounded. The soldiers reported that they may have wounded one of the Native Americans.

Over the course of months, Logan and his party were responsible for the deaths of 13 white settlers, and the capture of at least one 10-year-old boy and two slaves. On 24 September 1774, Logan attacked and killed the family of John Roberts, and left behind a note attached to a war club. The note was written "To Captain Cresap," whom Logan blamed for the Yellow Creek massacre. In the note, Logan took full responsibility for the attacks, since the local tribes were considered to be at peace.

== Lord Dunmore's War ==
John Connolly wrote to Governor John Murray, 4th Earl of Dunmore that the Shawnee and Mingo had declared open war on settlers. Dunmore raised Virginian forces and marched to the Ohio country, leading to the 10 October 1774 Battle of Point Pleasant.

Logan was not at the Battle of Point Pleasant, nor the negotiations that followed. Lord Dunmore sent Pennsylvanian John Gibson to find Logan. Gibson had been Logan's brother-in-law through his marriage to Logan's sister, the pregnant woman killed at the Yellow Creek massacre. When Gibson found him, Logan broke down in tears and asked him to record a message, now known as Logan's Lament.

I appeal to any White man to say if ever he entered Logan's Cabin hungry and I gave him not meat, if ever he came cold or naked and I gave him not Cloathing. During the Course of the last long and bloody War, Logan remained Idle in his Tent an Advocate for Peace; Nay such was my love for the Whites, that those of my own Country pointed at me as they passed by and said Logan is the friend of White men: I had even thought to live with you but for the Injuries of one man: Col. Cresop, the last Spring in cold blood and unprovoked cut off all the Relations of Logan not sparing even my Women and Children. There runs not a drop of my blood in the Veins of any human Creature. This called on me for Revenge: I have sought it. I have killed many. I have fully glutted my Vengeance. For my Country I rejoice at the Beams of Peace: But do not harbour a thought that mine is the Joy of fear: Logan never felt fear: He will not turn his Heal to save his life. Who is there to mourn for Logan? Not one.

The message from Logan to Lord Dunmore was printed by The Virginia Gazette in 1775, titled "Logan's Lament." It was also mentioned in Thomas Jefferson's Notes on the State of Virginia.
