= Daniel Greathouse =

American pioneer (c.1752–1775)

Daniel Greathouse (c.1752—1775) was a settler in colonial Virginia. His role in the Yellow Creek massacre in 1774 was instrumental in starting Lord Dunmore's War.

== Biography ==
Greathouse was born in Frederick County, Maryland, one of 11 children of Harmon and Mary Magdalena Stull Greathouse. The Greathouses moved from Maryland to Virginia about 1770 and Daniel owned 400 acres (1.6 km^{2}) of land at Mingo Bottom in Ohio County, Virginia. Daniel married Mary Morris, and they had two children, Gabriel and John.. Greathouse was a direct descendant of Herman Groethausen, who immigrated from Germany c.1710.

In the early 18th century, the Ohio Valley was settled by a multi-cultural group of Indians called the Mingo. They lacked a central government and, like all other Indians within the region at that time, were subject to the control of the Iroquois Confederacy (comprising the Seneca, Cayuga, Onondaga, Oneida, Mohawk, and Tuscarora people) headquartered in Upstate New York. The Mingo originally lived closer to the Atlantic Coast, but European settlement had pushed them into western Virginia and eastern Ohio. During the French and Indian War, the Mingo sided with the French. After the conclusion of the war in a French defeat, settlement of the region by American colonists led to increased tensions between them and the Mingo.

By 1774, tension between American settlers and the Indian tribes had increased; there had been killings on both sides. The rivalry between Pennsylvania and Virginia over the site of Pittsburgh increased these unsettled circumstances. Scouts returning to Fort Pitt reported that war was inevitable, and John Connolly sent word for settlers in outlying settlements to be on their guard for an attack.

Yellow Creek is a small tributary of the Ohio River located on the western (Ohio) bank about forty miles above Wheeling, Virginia (now West Virginia) and about 40 miles (64 km) west northwest of Fort Pitt (now Pittsburgh). Joshua Baker lived at the mouth of this creek and operated an inn or tavern of sorts, selling grog to both whites and Indians. Many of the inhabitants of the area had already evacuated, due to the warning sent by John Connolly. Baker was likewise preparing to leave when an Indian woman told him that Indians were preparing to murder him and his family. Baker got out word that he needed help.

Greathouse, leading a group of 21 men, came to his aid. The group reached Baker's on 30 April 1774 and were concealed by Baker in a back room. Seven Indians came across the river to Baker's place, including the brother of Logan, a prominent warrior of the Mingo tribe, and two women and a child, also related to Logan. The Indians began to drink. When Logan's brother put on a hat and coat belonging to one of the settlers, the settler shot and killed him. Greathouse's men who had been concealed in the back room rushed out and killed all the remaining Indians except for the child. As they left the tavern, they saw two canoes of Indian men painted and armed for war, coming across the river. Greathouse's group fired on them, killing most of the occupants of one of the canoes; the others turned back. It was said that Greathouse took the scalps of his Indian foes and dangled them from his belt, scalping being a declaration of war among the Indians.

This massacre, following a series of incidents, was the final break in relations between the white settlers and the Indians and is considered the immediate cause of Lord Dunmore's War of 1774. Terrible vengeance was wreaked on the white settlers by the Indians. Chief Logan incorrectly blamed Colonel Cresap for his brother's death and in turn, Cresap despised and hated Greathouse for his part in the affair.

Greathouse died of the measles in 1775 in Yohogania County, Virginia at about 23 years of age. Cresap died the same year.

== Jacob Greathouse ==
Daniel had a brother, Jacob Greathouse. According to Allan Eckert's "The Frontiersman," Jacob Greathouse was captured, tortured and killed by Indians in 1791 for participation in the Yellow Creek Massacre. However, other documentation demonstrates that Jacob Greathouse died in September 1777 with William Foreman-and that the Greathouse captured and tortured in 1791 on the Ohio river by Indians in revenge for the massacre was Jonathan Greathouse.
