= Logan (Iroquois leader) =

Native American orator and war leader (c. 1723 – 1780)

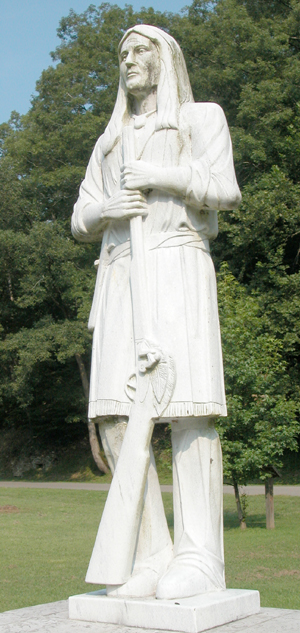
- Logan statue, Logan, West Virginia
- Born: c. 1723
- Died: 1780 (aged c. 57)
- Parent: Shikellamy

Logan the Orator (c. 1723 – 1780) was a Cayuga orator and war leader born of one of the Six Nations of the Haudenosaunee Confederacy. After his 1760s move to the Ohio Country, he became affiliated with the Mingo, a collective term for Seneca, Cayuga, Lenape and other League peoples in Ohio. He took revenge for family members killed by Virginian long knives in 1774 in what is known as the Yellow Creek Massacre. His actions against settlers on the frontier helped spark Dunmore's War later that year.

Logan became known for a speech, later known as Logan's Lament, which he reportedly delivered after the war. Scholars dispute important details about Logan, including his original name and whether the words of Logan's Lament were his.

== Identity debate ==
Scholars agree that Logan was a son of Chief Shikellamy, an important diplomat for the Haudenosaunee Confederacy. But, as anthropologist Anthony F. C. Wallace has written, "Which of Shikellamy's sons was Logan the orator has been a matter of dispute." Logan the orator has been variously identified as Tah-gah-jute, Tachnechdorus (also spelled "Tachnedorus" and "Taghneghdoarus"), Soyechtowa, Tocanioadorogon, the "Great Mingo", James Logan, and John Logan.

The name "Tah-gah-jute" was popularized in an 1851 book by Brantz Mayer entitled Tah-gah-jute: or Logan and Cresap. However, historian Francis Jennings wrote that Mayer's book was "erroneous from the first word of the title." He identified Logan as James Logan, also known as Soyechtowa and Tocanioadorogon. Historians who agree that Logan the orator was not named "Tah-gah-jute" sometimes identify him as Tachnechdorus. But Jennings identifies Tachnechdorus as Logan the orator's older brother.

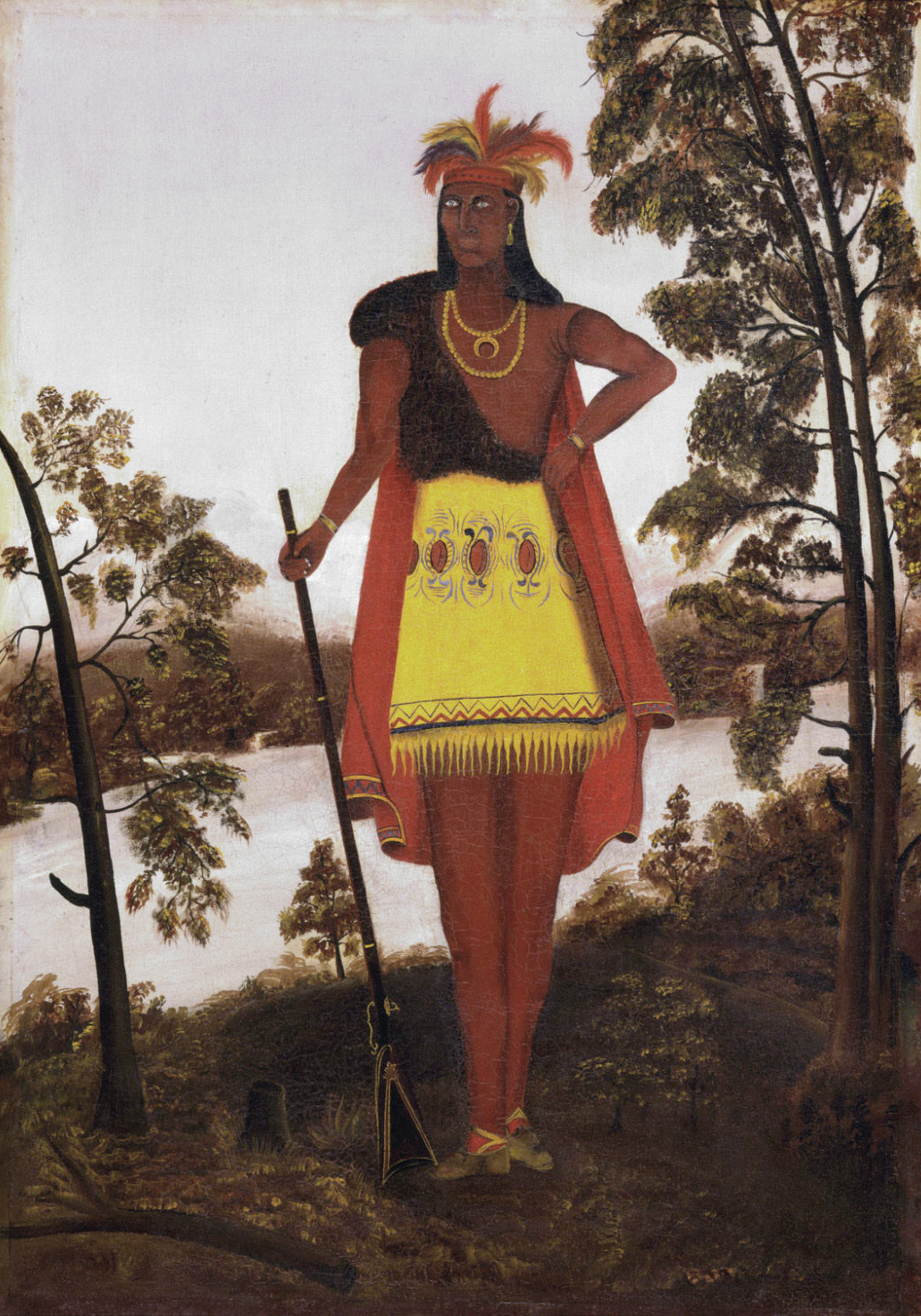
Oneida Chief Shikellamy

Logan's father Chief Shikellamy, who was Oneida, worked closely with Pennsylvania official James Logan to maintain the Covenant Chain relationship with the colony of Pennsylvania. Following a prevailing Native American practice, the young man who would become Logan the Mingo took the name "James Logan" out of admiration for his father's friend.

With the disruption of warfare, disease, and encroachment, some Seneca, Lenape, Susquehannock, and Cayuga among the Haudenosaunee were forced to flee to Ohio Country. They began to be called Mingos by European settlers. Logan the Mingo is usually identified as a Mingo "chief", but historian Richard White has written that "He was not a chief. Kayashuta and White Mingo were the Mingo chiefs. Logan was merely a war leader." The Haudenosaunee and other Native American tribes tended to have separate peace and war chiefs, or leaders. Like his father, Logan generally maintained friendly relationships with white settlers who were moving from eastern Pennsylvania and Virginia into the Ohio Country: the region that is now Ohio, West Virginia, Kentucky, and western Pennsylvania.

== Biography ==
=== Early life and family ===
John Logan's Father was the Haudenosaunee Chief, Shikellamy of the Oneida Tribe. His mother was Neanoma a Cayuga, and step-mother was Tutelo. Shikellamy and Neanoma were married in New York State. A historical marker in Danby, New York, designates the "possible birthplace of Chief Logan (Tah-Gah-Jute)," and then quotes Logan's famous speech.

John Logan was also known as Tachnechtoris, "The Spreading Oak" or John Shikellamy. He had 3 known brothers and one sister. John was the oldest of the siblings. His next brother was known as Tah-gah-jute, Sayughtowa, "The Beetling Brow", or James Logan. James later in life was referred to as "Logan, the Mingo." His brother, Arahhot or "Unhappy Jake" was killed in the war with the Catawbas in 1744. John Petty or Sogogeghyata, was the youngest of his brothers and bore the name of a Shamokin Indian Trader. John Logan's sister was known as the widow of Cajadies who was known as "the best hunter among all of the Indians" who died in November 1747.

Children, by tradition, took the clan or tribe of the mother. The Shikellamy children were of the Cayuga Tribe.

Statement of Jesse Logan, aged 106 years old and Great Grandson of Chief Shikellamy Cornplanter Reservation, Penn October 9, 1915:

I was born on the West Bank of the Allegheny River, in the Cornplanter Reservation, in 1809, the same year as Abraham Lincoln. My father was John Logan, Jr., a Cayuga, the only surviving child of Captain John Logan, the oldest son of Shikellamy. My mother was a daughter of the Seneca Chief Cornplanter. My father after retiring from the war path, settled at Cold Spring, in the Allegheny Reservation, in New York State, where he died in 1944 aged 100 years. Early in life he married Annie, a daughter of Cornplanter, who bore him fine children, three daughters and two sons. The last were names Lyman and Jesse. When my grandfather was old he came to this Reservation, where he lived with my father until his death. To the best of my knowledge, he died in this reservation, and is buried near the grave of Chief Cornplanter. I married Susan, a Seneca maid, and we had one child, James Logan, who died at the age of thirty. He was named for my great-uncle, the immortal Cayuga orator. Physically, my father and my son were small men, much smaller than my grandfather and my great-uncle. I took after my grandfather, as I am of large stature. I remember Cornplanter, my maternal grandfather, very well. He was a large, strong man, not dark in color, and with grey eyes. He was a great man for work. Every morning, winter or summer, rain or shine, at six o'clock he would come out of his house and ring a big dinner bell as a signal for all to get busy. He wore a red cap much the same as the white hunters do now. I remember Philip Tome, the great elk and panther hunter, who lived a mile up the river. I hunted elk with the famous Jim Jacobs many times. I was taught to hunt by my grandfather, who died in 1820. He was a very old man when I was very young, but I recall what he looked like. I killed hundreds of elk, many bear and deer, and quite a few panthers, the last in 1860. I have always been fond of sports. I walk two miles to town (Corydon) every time there is a baseball game. As a boy I excelled at the Indian games of long ball and snow snake. I love a joke and enjoy a good dinner. I use tobacco and liquor sparingly. I attribute my long life to my love of outdoor exercise and hunting and fishing. In my old age I am well cared for by my Indian friends, but regret that 'my blood flows not in any living person,' to use the language of my great-uncle James. There are many Logans in the Reservations in Pennsylvania and New York; some are descended from my brother and sisters, others adopted the name because of the honor attached to it. I wish I had been invited to attend the unveiling of my great-grandfather's [Shikellamy's] monument in Sunbury next week, but I guess that the world has forgotten Logan. I tried to fight for the white man in the Civil War, but when I got to Harrisburg I was sent back as too old. But I was a dead shot, and can still beat men one-quarter of my age with the gun and bow and arrow. Next summer, if I live I hope to visit Logan Valley, where my grandfather resided, and view the scenes that my father loved to talk about. I would also like to visit Mrs. Gross, at Fort Augusta, who has done so much to honor Shikellamy's memory. I have lived a long while, but I am not tired of life, and each day seems new and pleasant to me.

=== Yellow Creek massacre ===
Logan's friendly relations with white settlers changed after the Yellow Creek massacre of April 30, 1774. A group of Virginia Long knives led by Daniel Greathouse murdered a number of Mingo, among them Logan's brother (commonly known as John Petty) and at least two other close female relatives, one of them pregnant and caring for an infant daughter. Her children's father was John Gibson, a prominent trader in the region. These Mingo had been living near the mouth of Yellow Creek, and had been lured to the cabin of Joshua Baker, a settler and rum trader who lived across the Ohio River from their village. The Mingo in Baker's cabin were all murdered, except for the infant mixed-race child, who was spared with the intention of giving her to her father. At least two canoes were dispatched from the Yellow Creek village to aid their members, but they were repelled by Greathouse's men concealed along the river. In all, approximately a dozen Mingo were murdered in the cabin and on the river. Logan was not present in the area when the massacre took place, and was summoned to return by runners.

=== Logan's revenge ===
Influential tribal chiefs in the region, such as Cornstalk (Shawnee), White Eyes (Lenape), and Guyasuta (Seneca/Mingo), attempted to negotiate a peaceful resolution lest the incident develop into a larger war, but by Native American custom Logan had the right to retaliate for the murders. Several parties of mixed Mingo and Shawnee warriors soon struck the frontier, including one led by Logan. They attacked settlers in several frontier regions, both killing and taking captives. One known as the Spicer Massacre in Greene County, Pennsylvania. The Royal Governor of Virginia, Lord Dunmore, responded by launching an expedition against the Mingo and Shawnee, in the conflict known as Dunmore's War.

=== Logan's Lament ===
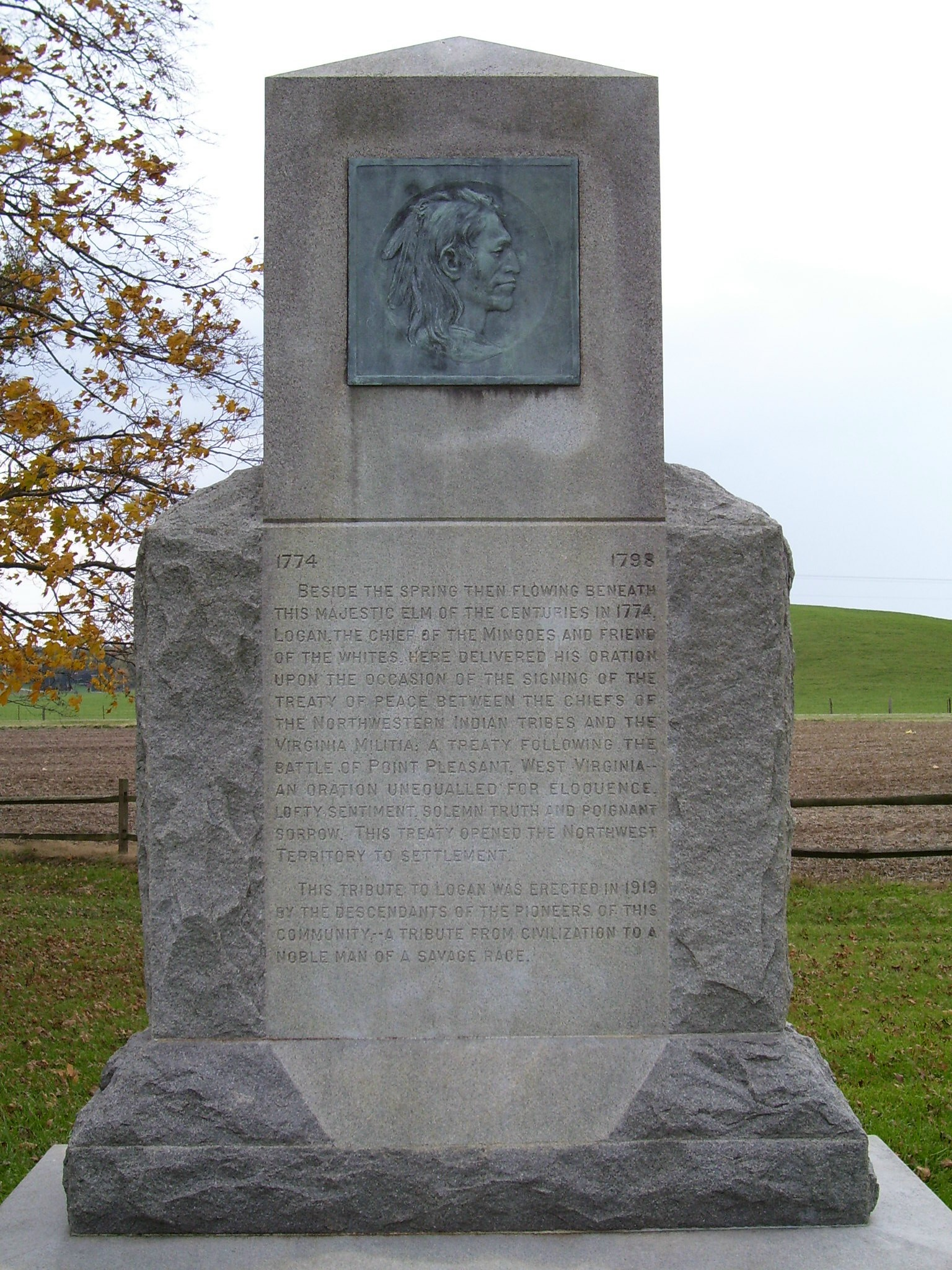
Monument to Logan at the Logan Elm State Memorial in Pickaway County, Ohio. The text of "Logan's Lament" is inscribed on the other side of the monument.

Logan was not at the Battle of Point Pleasant (October 10, 1774), the only major battle of Dunmore's War. Following the battle, Dunmore's army marched into the Ohio Country and compelled the Ohio Indians to agree to a peace treaty.

According to tradition, Logan refused to attend the negotiations and instead made a speech that became legendary:

I appeal to any white man to say, if ever he entered Logan's cabin hungry, and he gave him not meat; if ever he came cold and naked, and he clothed him not. During the course of the last long and bloody war, Logan remained idle in his cabin, an advocate for peace. Such was my love for the whites, that my countrymen pointed as they passed, and said, Logan is the friend of the white men. I have even thought to live with you but for the injuries of one man. Col. Cresap, the last spring, in cold blood, and unprovoked, murdered all the relations of Logan, not sparing even my women and children. There runs not a drop of my blood in the veins of any living creature. This has called on me for revenge. I have sought it: I have killed many: I have fully glutted my vengeance. For my country, I rejoice at the beams of peace. But do not harbor a thought that mine is the joy of fear. Logan never felt fear. He will not turn on his heel to save his life. Who is there to mourn for Logan? Not one.

First published in The Virginia Gazette in 1775, the speech was more widely popularized when Thomas Jefferson reprinted it in his book Notes on the State of Virginia (1782). In 1822 the speech inspired the John Neal novel Logan, which also featured Logan as a main character. The American elm tree in Pickaway County, Ohio under which Logan was said to have given the speech became known as the Logan Elm. It grew to great size before dying in 1964.

=== Logan's Letter ===
To Captain Cressap – What did you kill my people on Yellow Creek for. The white People killed my kin at Coneestoga a great while ago, & I thought nothing of that. But you killed my kin again on Yellow Creek, and took my cousin prisoner then I thought I must kill too; and I have been three time[s to war since but] the Indians is not Angry only myself.

— Captain John Logan

=== Later life and death ===
The remainder of Logan's life is shrouded in obscurity. Logan continued his attacks on white settlers and associated himself with British-allied Mohawks during the American Revolution. He died in an altercation near Lake Erie in 1780. He was reportedly assassinated by his own nephew, urged on by other Mingo who were concerned at Logan's erratic behavior. Years later, the nephew stated that he had agreed to kill Logan "Because he was too great a man to live."

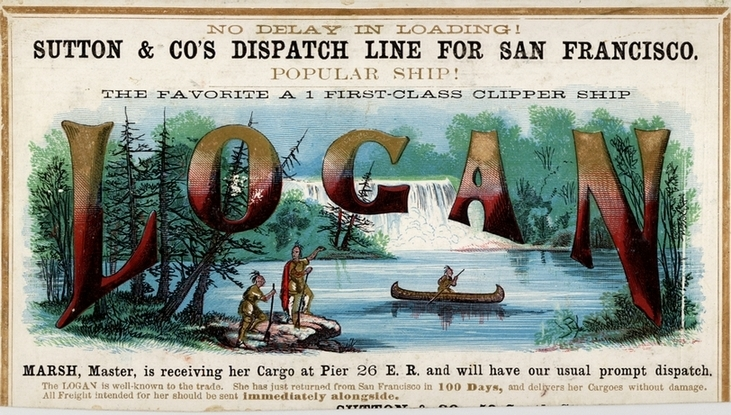
Clipper ship Logan

== Legacy ==
Numerous places carry Logan's name, including:

- Logan, Ohio
- Logan County, West Virginia (None of the 9 other "Logan" counties in the USA is named for the Mingo leader.)
  - Logan, West Virginia
  - Chief Logan State Park, West Virginia
- Logan Elm State Memorial, Ohio
  - Logan Elm High School is located near the state memorial
- Fort Hill Cemetery in Auburn, New York, an area traditional to the Cayugas, has a large monument to him.
- Chief Logan Reservation – a camp property in Ray, Ohio opened in 1963 by the Chief Logan Council of the Boy Scouts of America. The Chief Logan Council was consolidated in 1994, and the camp management was passed on to the newly created Simon Kenton Council, who closed the camp permanently after the 2019 season.
- Logan Honors Program - at Fort Steuben Scout Reservation in Freeport, Ohio, managed by the Mountaineer Area Council of the Boy Scouts of America.
- Logan Branch of Spring Creek in Centre County, Pennsylvania.
- Logan and Michael Cresap resolved their differences after Cresap proved that he was innocent of the massacre of Logan's people. Cresap named a son after Logan and, since then, three generations of Cresap male descendants have been named Logan. The tradition has been continued in the 21st century.
- Mingoville lies on Logan's Path and was named for Logan.
- Indianola Junior High School in Columbus, Ohio, has a sculpture detail of Logan with the carved caption TAHGAHJUTE

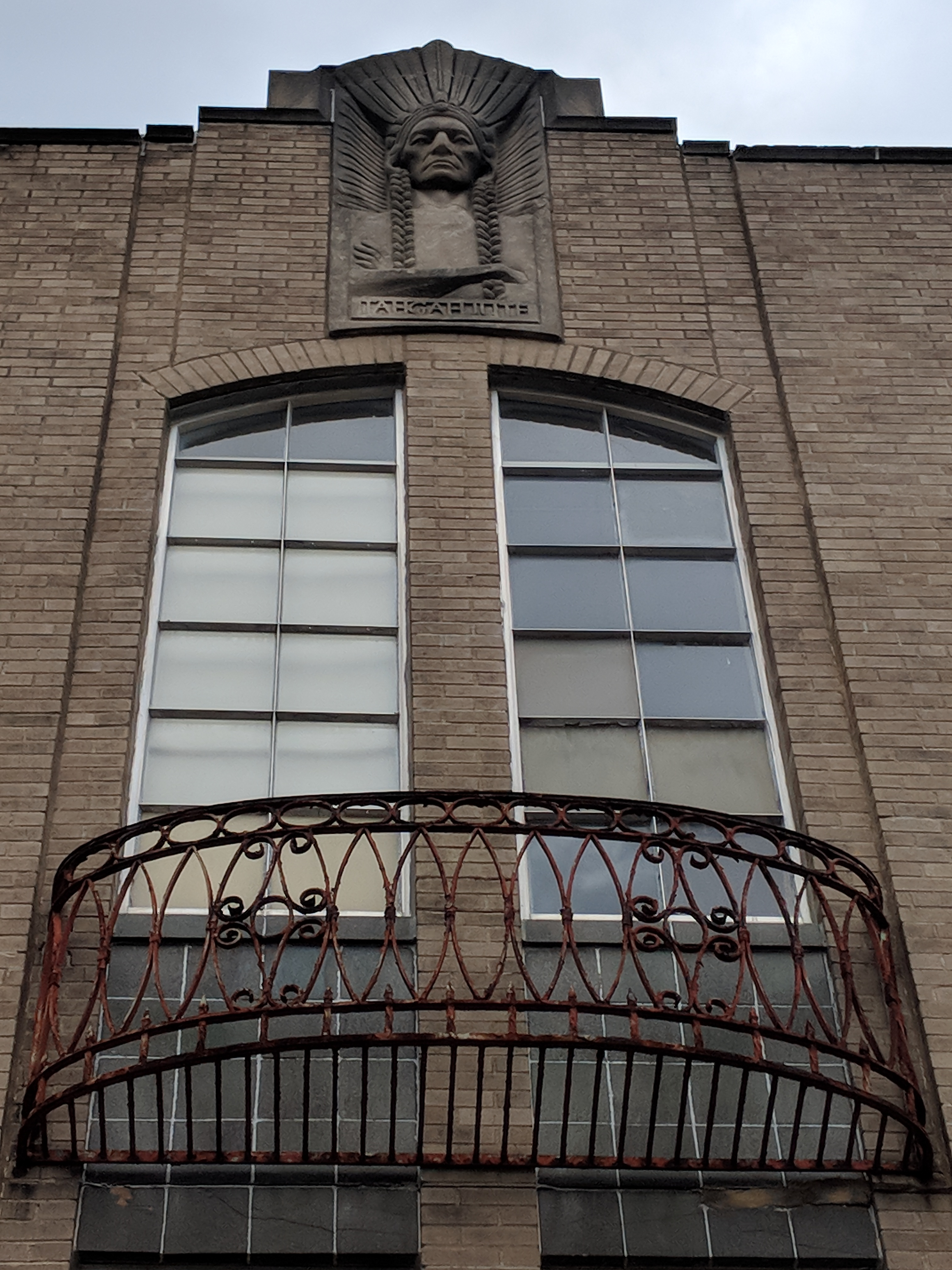
Indianaola Junior High School window detail with the caption TAHGAHJUTE

== Bibliography ==
- Logan –The Mingo Chief, 1710-1780, Ohio Archæological and Historical Society Publications: Volume 20 [1911], pp. 137–175.
