= John Gibson (American soldier) =

American politician (1740–1822)

Secretary of the Indiana Territory
- In office July 4, 1800 – November 7, 1816
- Governor: William Henry Harrison; Thomas Posey
- Preceded by: (office created)
- Succeeded by: Robert A. New (as Secretary of State)

Acting Governor of the Indiana Territory
- In office September 17, 1812 – March 3, 1813
- Preceded by: William Henry Harrison; Territorial Governor
- Succeeded by: Thomas Posey; Territorial Governor

Personal details
- Born: May 23, 1740 Lancaster, Pennsylvania
- Died: April 10, 1822 (aged 81) Pittsburgh, Pennsylvania
- Profession: Soldier; Merchant; Public servant

Military service
- Allegiance: Kingdom of Great Britain; United States of America
- Battles/wars: French and Indian War; Battle of Fort Duquesne; Lord Dunmore's War; American Revolutionary War; Battle of White Plains; Battle of Fort Washington; Siege of Fort Laurens; War of 1812; Battle of Fort Harrison

John Gibson (May 23, 1740 – April 10, 1822) was a veteran of the French and Indian War, Lord Dunmore's War, the American Revolutionary War, Tecumseh's War, and the War of 1812. A delegate to the first Pennsylvania constitutional convention in 1790, and a merchant, he earned a reputation as a frontier leader and had good relations with many Native American in the region. At age sixty he was appointed the Secretary of the Indiana Territory where he was responsible for organising the territorial government. He served twice as acting governor of the territory, including a one-year period during the War of 1812 in which he mobilized and led the territorial militia to relieve besieged Fort Harrison.

== Early life ==
John Gibson was born in Lancaster, Pennsylvania, on May 23, 1740, the son of George and Elizabeth de Vinez Gibson. Gibson's father was born in County Antrim, Ireland and came to Pennsylvania in 1730. The elder Gibson was a trader, who exchanged goods with the Conestogas who often met near his tavern in Lancaster, Pennsylvania. John Gibson's mother Elizabeth was born in France and left that country because she was a Huguenot

Most of Gibson's early life was spent along the Allegheny frontier where he was a merchant trader. He held local office in several counties as a judge, clerk, and sheriff. Although there is no record of his schooling, he was reputed to be well educated for his times.

In 1758, at age seventeen, he participated in the Forbes Expedition under General John Forbes against the French at Fort Duquesne as part of the French and Indian War. He remained at Fort Pitt after the war to engage in trade with Native Americans. He was captured by Lenape during Pontiac's Rebellion while trading in the west and was condemned to be burnt, but escaped death when he was adopted by an old Native American woman whose son had died in battle. He remained with the Lenape tribe for some time. Later Gibson was freed as a result of the Boquet Expedition. After this Gibson returned to being an Indian trader. He built a house at Logstown which in 1772 was described as the "only house there" by the Reverend David McClure. Gibson married a relative of Mingo leader Logan and also learned to speak the Mingo language. Gibson's wife and several other Mingo were murdered by a group of settlers in May 1774. Gibson's daughter survived this incident, and was put into his care and he saw to her education. In 1774, he participated in Dunmore's War and produced a written translation of Logan's famous speech suing for peace: "I appeal to any white man to say if he ever entered Logan's cabin hungry and he gave him not meat."

== Revolutionary War ==
In 1775, Gibson was made the Indian agent at Pittsburgh to represent the interests of Virginia, acting for John Connolly who in turn acted under Lord Dunmore. With war between the Colonists and England likely to start soon, Dunmore sent a letter to Connolly to contact White Eyes to convince him to join the British cause and fight the colonists. Connolly gave the letter to Gibson to take to White Eyes. However Gibson decided that the local committee of correspondence ought to see the letter, and with their receiving the letter processes were put in place that led to Connolly's arrest on November 13, 1775, close to Hagerstown, Maryland. Gibson was also appointed a magistrate for Fincastle County, Virginia, which was at that time considered to include Pittsburgh by Connolly in 1775.

On May 16, 1775, Gibson was elected the colonel over the 6th Virginia.

In the early stages of the American Revolutionary War, Gibson was active in negotiations with Native Americans. In early negotiations, Netawatwees requested that traders be sent to his village for him and his fellow Lenape to sell furs to. He specifically requested that Gibson be included among these men, describing Gibson as a "good man". From October 1778 until January 1779 Gibson served as the agent to the tribes in what is today Ohio for the Continental Congress government.

Gibson commanded a regiment during the battles in New York and stayed in the theater until after the retreat through New Jersey. He was then reassigned to command the army on the western front and left in command of forces at Fort Laurens during the harsh winter of 1778–1779, during which the fort was subjected to a siege by British and native forces. In the summer of 1779, Gibson was made the second in command to Daniel Brodhead. For a few months after Broadhead was removed in May 1781 Gibson was the commanding officer at Fort Pitt. Gibson had intended to send troops to support George Rogers Clark but the negative effects of Broadhead's actions prevented Gibson from doing so.

In August 1781, Broadhead returned to claim control at Fort Pitt. He arrested Gibson accusing him of having usurped his authority. George Washington sent orders to Broadhead to step down from his command, and so he released Gibson and let him take over command again. Civilian authorities in the area then arrested Broadhead. In November 1781, David Williamson brought in some Moravian Lenapes captured in Salem, Schoenbrunn and Gnadenhutten, Ohio, to Fort Pitt. It is unclear if Gibson or William Irvine was in command when these Lenapes were released, but it seems that Gibson was at least blamed for this release. The problem was that after the release there were attacks on western Pennsylvania settlements. The fact that these were probably done by Half-King and his fellow Wyandots and not by the released Lenape was not factored into account by those who felt to denounce Gibson for this occurrence.

In January 1782, Irvine went to Philadelphia to meet with congress and left Gibson in charge. The enlisted men at Fort Pitt then threatened to mutiny, which may have contributed to the conditions that led to the Gnadenhutten Massacre, although it was only one of many factors involved in the situation. Irvine wrote "a thousand lies are propagated against [Gibson] … occasioned by his unhappy connection with a certain trube, which leads people to imagine that he has an attachment to Indians in general."

== Life in Pennsylvania ==
After the war Gibson returned to being a merchant but he went bankrupt, partly due to debts he had incurred in supporting the campaign of George Rogers Clark.

Gibson was a judge in Allegheny County from 1791 to 1800. He was also major-general and commanding officer of the militia for Allegheny County, and a member of Pennsylvania's constitutional convention in 1790. Gibson was also involved with the purchase of the area of the Erie Triangle from the Iroquois for the state of Pennsylvania.

== Indiana Territory ==
U.S. President John Adams appointed Gibson to be secretary of the Indiana Territory in 1800, despite him being sixty years old. Gibson arrived in the territory in July of that year and took up his duties. For nearly a year he was the only government official in the territory and began organizing the government by appointing officers for the territorial militia. Governor William Henry Harrison did not arrive in the territory until January 1801 in which time Gibson served as acting-governor. One of his first acts as secretary was to conduct a census of the territory. It took him a full year of investigation to find that the population was slightly less than five thousand. After Harrison arrived in the territory, Gibson took on several more positions after being appointed justice of the peace, Knox County recorder, and a judge of the low court that tried misdemeanors and petty crimes. Gibson's relationship with the local tribes proved invaluable to Harrison during the numerous treaty negotiations in the early part of his term. Gibson, who spoke several of the native languages, was the first to become aware of Tecumseh's attempt to massacre the citizens of Vincennes in 1810 and was able to quickly and secretly gather together soldiers to prevent the situation from escalating.

Gibson became acting-governor again in the summer of 1811, while Harrison was out of the territory. The American Indian Confederacy led by Tecumseh began to make aggressive movements and attacked Fort Harrison. Gibson called up the territorial militia and the Indiana Rangers, and organized several regiments to go to its aid. He was also instrumental in negotiating treaties with the Lenape and other tribes and preventing them from entering the war against the United States. Gibson remained acting governor once war was officially declared while Harrison led the army against the British and their native allies in the War of 1812. His final act as acting-governor was to oversee the move of the territorial capitol from Vincennes to Corydon following the reorganization of the territory by Congress. He returned to his secretary's position in May 1813 when Thomas Posey arrived in the territory to assume the governorship. Gibson continued in the office of secretary until Indiana achieved statehood in 1816.

After completing his term in government, at age seventy-six Gibson and his wife Ann returned to private life, briefly remaining in Vincennes. He returned to live with his daughter and son-in-law, George Wallace, in Braddock's Field near Pittsburg, where he died on April 10, 1822, at age eighty-two, having suffered two years from an "incurable cataract". Gibson County, Indiana, was named in his honor.

Political offices
Preceded by William Henry Harrison; Territorial Governor	Acting Governor of Indiana Territory; 1812–1813	Succeeded by Thomas Posey; Territorial Governor
