= Piscataqua =

Piscataqua, believed to be an Abenaki word meaning rapid waters, may refer to:

- Piscataqua River, a fast-moving estuarine river dividing coastal New Hampshire and Maine in the United States
- Piscataqua River (Presumpscot River), a tributary of the Presumpscot River in Maine

== See also ==
- Piscataquis County, Maine
- Piscataquis River, a tributary of the Penobscot River in Maine
- Piscataquog River, a tributary of the Merrimack River in New Hampshire
- Piscataway (disambiguation)
