= Lord Dunmore's War =

1774 conflict in the Colony of Virginia

- Part of the American Indian Wars
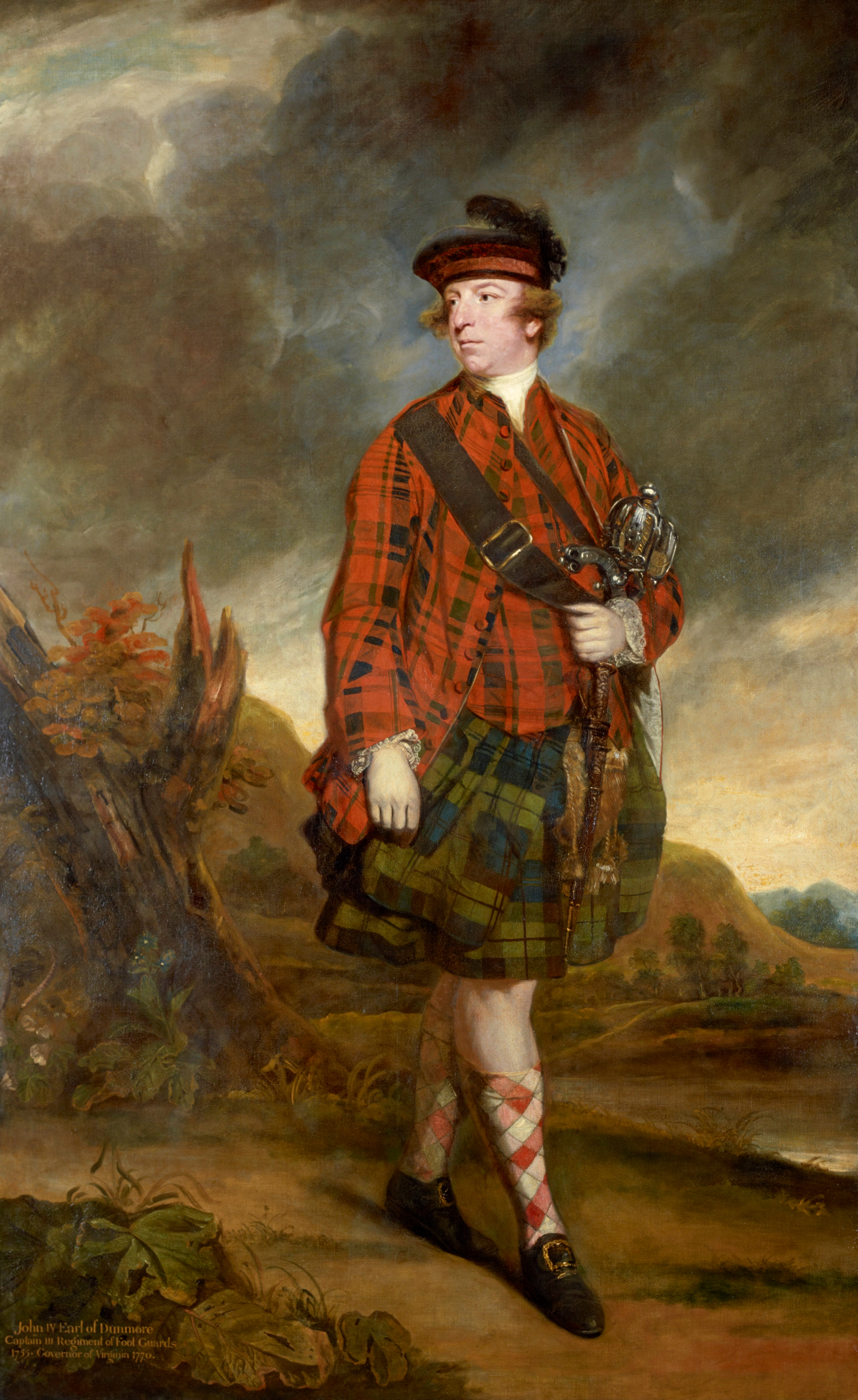
- Portrait of Lord Dunmore by Joshua Reynolds, 1765. John Murray, 4th Earl of Dunmore, for whom the war is named
Date	April 27, 1774 – October 10, 1774 (5 months, 1 week and 6 days)
Location	Upper Ohio Valley 39.918°N 80.8048°W
Result	Virginian victory

Belligerents
Shawnees; Mingos	Colony of Virginia

Commanders and leaders
Cornstalk; Talgayeeta (Logan)	Lord Dunmore; Andrew Lewis; Angus McDonald; William Crawford

Lord Dunmore's War, also known as Dunmore's War, was a brief conflict in the fall of 1774 between the British Colony of Virginia and the Shawnee and Mingo in the trans-Appalachia region of the colony south of the Ohio River. The war lasted from May to October 1774. The governor of Virginia during the conflict was John Murray, 4th Earl of Dunmore, who in May 1774, asked the House of Burgesses to declare a state of war with the Shawnee and Mingo and call out the Virginia militia.

The conflict resulted from escalating violence between white settlers, who, in accordance with previous treaties, especially the Treaty of Fort Stanwix (1768), were exploring and moving into land south of the Ohio River (modern West Virginia, southwestern Pennsylvania, and Kentucky), and the Ohio Country Shawnee who had historical hunting rights in the south of Ohio lands of the Haudenosaunee Confederacy. Resulting cross-river attacks by the Shawnee caused war to be declared "to pacify the hostile Indian war bands". The war ended soon after Virginia's victory in the Battle of Point Pleasant on October 10, 1774. In the ensuing Treaty of Camp Charlotte, the Native Americans surrendered their hunting rights south of the Ohio, and agreed to cease attacks upon travelers on the river and recognize the river, running nearly north–south at its eastern end, as the boundary between the Indigenous lands of the Ohio Country to the west, and the British colonies to the east. This was a major resetting of the Appalachian boundary defined by the Royal Proclamation of 1763 which ended the French and Indian War.

Although the Indigenous leaders signed the treaty, conflict within the Indigenous tribes soon broke out. Some tribesmen felt the treaty sold out their claims and opposed it, and others believed that another war would mean only further losses of territory to the settlers. When the American Revolutionary War broke out between the American settlers and the British in 1775, the war factions of the Indian nations quickly gained power. They encouraged the various Indigenous nations to ally with the British during the war, initiating the Cherokee-American wars that lasted nearly two decades.

== Settlement and resistance in the Kentucke country ==
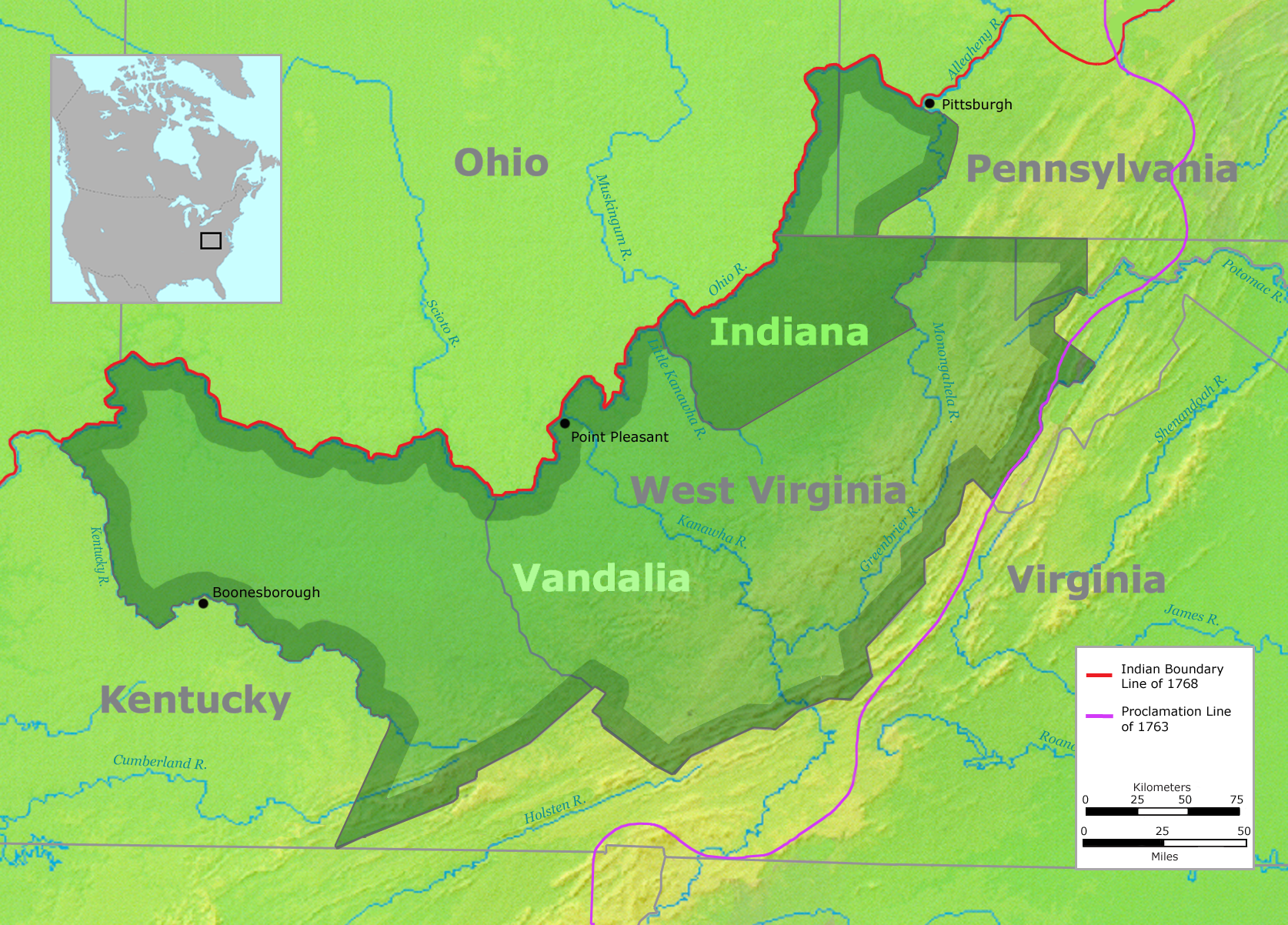
Trans-Appalachian Virginia Colony, beyond the Monongahela River, including Kentucke country (west of Kanawha River and including land west of the Kentucke River, lower left). Virginia claimed Kentucke lands to the Mississippi River.

The area south of the Ohio River and west of the Kanawha River (long referred to as Kentucke country after a region around the namesake river in what is today eastern Kentucky) had been claimed by the Haudenosaunee Confederacy since their conquest in the 17th-century Beaver Wars. Although they were the most powerful Indian nation in the Northern Colonies, other tribes also made claims to the area and often hunted the region.

When, in accordance with the Treaty of Fort Stanwix (1768), British officials acquired the land south of the Ohio River from the Haudenosaunee, many other Ohio Indians who had hunted in these lands refused to accede to the treaty and prepared to defend their hunting rights.

At the forefront of this resistance were the Shawnee, the most powerful among the allied Algonquin tribes of the Ohio Valley. They soon organized a large confederacy of Shawnee-Ohio Confederated Indians who were opposed to the British and the Haudenosaunee in order to enforce their claims. British officials worked to isolate the Shawnee diplomatically from other Indian nations. When full-blown hostilities broke out within a few years, the Shawnee would find that they faced the Virginia militia with few allies.

Following the 1768 treaty, colonial explorers, surveyors, and settlers began pouring into the region. This immediately brought them into direct contact with Native Americans of the upper Ohio Valley, especially the Allegheny River. George Washington wrote in his journal for November 17, 1770, "The Indians who are very dexterous, even their women, in the Management of Canoes, have there Hunting Camps & Cabins all along the River for the convenience of Transporting their Skins by Water to Market."

=== The Boone incident ===
In September 1773, noted frontiersman Daniel Boone led a group of about 50 emigrants up the Powell River valley in Tennessee in the first attempt by white colonists to establish a settlement in Kentucke. On October 9, 1773, just south of the Cumberland Gap, Boone's oldest son James, age 16, and a small group of men and boys who were retrieving supplies were attacked by a band of Lenape, Shawnees, and Cherokees. They had decided "to send a message of their opposition to settlement..." James Boone and Henry Russell, a teenage son of future Revolutionary War officer William Russell, were captured and tortured to death. The brutality of the killings shocked the settlers along the frontier, and Boone's party abandoned their expedition. By December, the incident had been reported in Baltimore and Philadelphia newspapers.

The deaths among Boone's party were among the seminal events that culminated in Lord Dunmore's War. For the next several years, Indian nations opposed to the treaty continued to attack settlers, ritually mutilated and tortured to death the surviving men, and took the women and children into slavery.

Boone's expedition was the first of several as part of a scheme with land speculator Richard Henderson to establish the Transylvania Colony in Kentucke.

=== Early Allegheny settlements ===
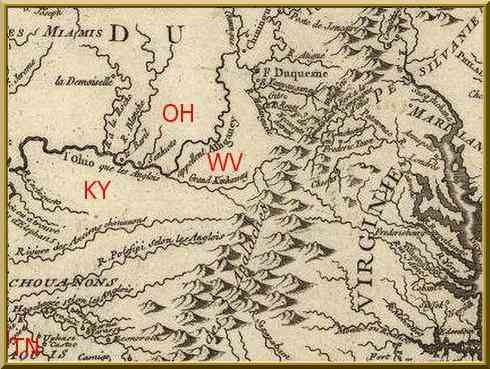
From the Great Kanawha River upstream, what is now the Ohio was called the Allegheny; map, 1755.

Starting in 1769, Ebenezer Zane, afterwards a famed "Indian fighter" and guide, known for Zane's trace, had established a settlement on Wheeling Creek just over the Pennsylvania border on the Allegheny he named "Zanesburg" (now Wheeling, West Virginia). Later, Fort Fincastle was sited there.

Among the early settlers of the Allegheny valley beyond Pennsylvania was Captain Michael Cresap, the owner of a trading post at Redstone Old Fort (now Brownsville, Pennsylvania) on the Monongahela River. Under authority of the colonial government of Virginia, Cresap had taken control of extensive tracts of land at and below the mouth of Middle Island Creek (now St. Marys, West Virginia.) He went there in the early spring of 1774 with a party of men to settle his holdings.

=== The Clark Expedition to Kentucky ===
In spring of 1774, a group that included George Rogers Clark, who later became a general during the Revolutionary War, had gathered at the mouth of the Little Kanawha River (now Parkersburg, West Virginia). They were waiting there for the arrival of other Virginians expected to join them before they moved downriver to settle lands in Kentucky. Clark's group began to hear reports that hostile Indians were robbing and occasionally killing traders, surveyors and others traveling down the Ohio. So they invited another settler, Captain Michael Cresap, who also intended to go to Kentucky, and who had combat experience, to join the group.

Cresap understood that any provocations might result in war, so he suggested the group return upstream to Zane's small settlement at "Zanesburg" (the future Wheeling) and wait to see if Indian hostilities would decline. However, when they arrived, they found the whole area in an uproar. People were panicked by the stories of the survivors of the Indian attacks. They were upset by the Indian brutality towards captured settlers. Fearing for the lives of women and children, colonists living on the frontier flocked to the town for protection. A message from John Connolly, the garrison commander at upstream Fort Pitt, indicated that the local tribes including Shawnee and Lenape (Delaware), intended war.

Cresap called a council on April 26. After he read Connolly's letter aloud, the assembly declared war against the Indians. After spotting some Indian canoes on the river the next day, settlers chased them fifteen miles (24 km) downriver to Pipe Creek. There settlers engaged them in battle, with a few casualties on each side. The following day, Clark's party abandoned the original idea of proceeding to Kentucky. Expecting retaliation, they broke camp and retreated with Cresap's men to his headquarters at Redstone Old Fort.

=== The Yellow Creek massacre ===
Immediately after the Pipe Creek attack, settlers killed relatives of the Mingo leader Logan. Up until this point, Logan had expressed peaceful intentions toward the settlers. He and his hunting party were camped on the west bank of the Ohio at Yellow Creek, about 30 miles (48 km) above Zanesburg (near present day Steubenville, Ohio) and across the river from Baker's Bottom. On April 30 some members of the hunting party (Logan was not among them) crossed the river to the cabin of Joshua Baker, a settler and rum trader. The visiting Mingo included Logan's younger brother, commonly known as John Petty, and two closely related women. The younger woman was pregnant and also had an infant girl with her. The father of both these children was John Gibson, a well-known trader. Once the group was inside Baker's cabin, some 30 frontiersmen, led by Daniel Greathouse, suddenly crowded in and killed all the visitors except the infant.

When Logan heard of the massacre, he was led to believe that Cresap, not Greathouse, was the man responsible for the attack. However, many people familiar with the incident (including Clark) knew that Greathouse and his men were the ones who had killed the party. Settlers along the frontiers realized that these killings were likely to provoke the remaining Indian nations of the Ohio Country to attack. Settlers remaining on the frontier immediately sought safety, either in blockhouses or by fleeing eastward across the Monongahela River. Many even traveled back across the Allegheny Mountains. Their fear was well founded. Logan and small parties of Shawnee and Mingo soon began striking at frontier settlers in revenge for the murders at Yellow Creek.

=== Prelude to war ===
The following month, a field surveyor named William Preston sent a letter of report to the head engineer of the frontier fort construction, namely George Washington, which indicates his understanding of circumstances just prior to the outbreak of Dunmore's War:

FINCASTLE May 27. 1774.
DEAR SIR

Agreeable to my Promise I directed Mr. Floyd an Assistant to Survey your Land on Cole River on his Way to the Ohio, which he did and in a few Days afterwards sent me the Plot by Mr. Thomas Hog. Mr. Spotswood Dandridge who left the Surveyors on the Ohio after Hog Parted with them, wrote me that Mr. Hog and two other Men with him had never since been heard of. I have had no Opportunity of writing to Mr. Floyd Since. Tho' I suppose he will send me the Courses by the first Person that comes up, if so I shall make out the Certificate and send it down. This I directed him to do when we parted to prevent Accidents. But I am really afraid the Indians will hinder them from doing any Business of Vallue this Season as the Company being only 33 and dayly decreasing were under the greatest Apprehension of Danger when Mr. Dandridge parted with them.

It has been long disputed by our Hunters whether Louisa or Cumberland Rivers was the Boundary between us and the Cherokees. I have taken the Liberty to inclose to you a Report made by some Scouts who were out by my Order; and which Sets that matter beyond a Doubt.

It is say'd the Cherrokees claim the Land to the Westward of the Louisa & between Cumberland M [mutilated] and the ohio. If so, and our Government gives it up we loose all the most Valluable part of that Country. The Northern Indians Sold that Land to the English at the Treaty of Lancaster in 1744, by the Treaty of Logs Town in 1752 and by that at Fort Stanwix in 1768. At that Time the Cherrokees laid no Claim to that Land & how the[y] come to do it now I cannot imagine...

== Dunmore's expedition ==
=== Mobilization and movements ===
Early in May 1774, Dunmore received word that fighting had begun at Yellow Creek and other points on the Ohio. He requested the legislature to raise regular military forces to quell the threat of growing violence. The House of Burgesses preferred temporary militia forces. The legislature spent their time in session showing support to Boston and discussing the border dispute with Pennsylvania, but failed to renew the expiring militia act. Dunmore dissolved the House of Burgesses on 26 May 1774 and used his executive power under the expiring Invasions and Insurrections Act to mobilize Virginia's county militias.

According to historians Eric Hinderaker and Peter C. Mancall in At the Edge of Empire (2003):

With the new forces, Dunmore advanced toward the Ohio where he split his force into two groups: one would move down the Ohio from Fort Pitt (now Pittsburgh), 1,700 men led by him, and another body of 800 troops under Colonel Andrew Lewis would travel from Camp Union (now Lewisburg, West Virginia) with the two forces rendezvousing at the mouth of the Great Kanawha River. Under this general plan, Dunmore traveled to Fort Pitt and duly proceeded with his forces down the Ohio. On September 30, he arrived at Fort Fincastle (later Fort Henry), recently built at Zanesburg at his direction.

The force under Lewis, now 1,100 strong, proceeded from Camp Union to the headwaters of the Kanawha. From there, he continued downriver to the appointed rendezvous, reaching the river's mouth (October 6) where he established "Camp Pleasant" (soon to be known as Point Pleasant). Not finding Dunmore there, he sent messengers up the Ohio to meet him and tell him of the arrival. On October 9 Dunmore sent a dispatch announcing his presence at the mouth of the Hocking River, and that he would proceed to the Shawnee towns on the Scioto. He ordered Lewis to cross the Ohio and meet him at the Shawnee towns.

=== Fort Fincastle ===
Dunmore encouraged the county militia lieutenants to build small forts to protect inhabitants, and also for use by militias. Connolly sent William Crawford to build Fort Fincastle in June 1774, to oversee the mouth of Wheeling Creek. From here, Connolly planned to launch offensive operations.

=== McDonald's Expedition ===
In the first battle of the war, on July 26, 1774, forces under Angus McDonald crossed the Ohio River to attack the villages of Wakatomika. McDonald commanded a battalion of about 400 men divided into eight companies, including Michael Cresap, George Rogers Clark, and Daniel Morgan as three of the company commanders.

After making first contact on July 31 with 3 Native Americans on horseback, McDonald suspected a decoy initiated ambush, and organized the companies into three columns. The following day, they indeed encountered three Native American scouts who ran through a swamp, leading McDonald's battalion to an ambush. Prepared for this tactic, McDonald's battalion flanked the Native Americans, who conducted a fighting withdrawal. The battalion reported two dead and five wounded, with one Native American confirmed killed.

The Virginians continued to the Muskingum River, where they exchanged musket fire with village defenders, killing one while suffering no losses. During the exchange, a Virginian named Joseph Nicholson and a Lenape man recognized one another, and the Lenape man crossed the river to speak with McDonald. He told McDonald that the Pennsylvanians had warned the area villages of the "cruel" Virginian's approach, and that the Lenape were friendly towards white settlers. The Lenape man left and returned the next day with two more Lenape men and one Mingo. After some discussion, McDonald sent them with a message that he would spare the nearby villages if they released two white women that had recently been captured, and offered three warriors to be held by the Virginians until the chiefs could meet in a council.

While awaiting their response, McDonald sent two companies to cross the river downstream. When the Lenape did not return on August 2, 1774, McDonald ordered an attack. Along the way, they found the Mingo man from the previous day, who said the villages had refused their terms. McDonald kept the man as hostage. The two companies that had crossed the river, meanwhile, met an ambush of defenders. The Virginians outflanked their position and believed that they had killed or wounded several. The entire battalion entered the villages, which they found abandoned. They plundered and burned one Mingo and five Shawnee villages, but spared the Lenape villages since they were considered neutral.

Shawnee defenders killed two Virginians and wounded several more, but McDonald was able to sack multiple villages and destroy their fields. They returned to Wheeling with three Shawnee captives and three scalps. Native American attacks continued; McDonald's campaign accomplished little, but convinced Governor Dunmore that more than overwhelming force was needed.

=== Battle of Point Pleasant ===
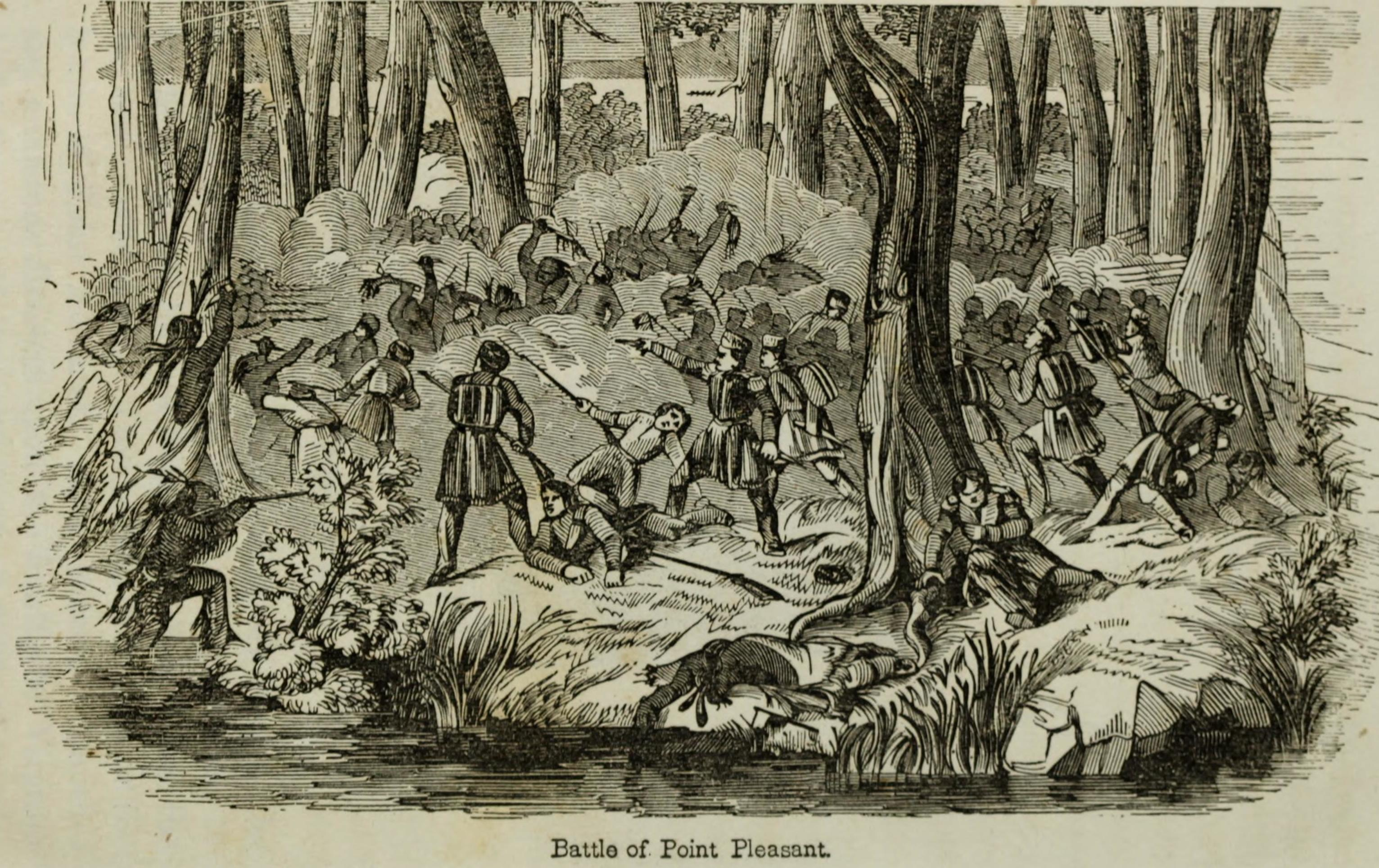
1854 illustration of the battle

On October 10, before Lewis began crossing the Ohio, he and his force were surprised by warriors under Chief Cornstalk. The Battle of Point Pleasant (at what is today its namesake Point Pleasant, WV on the WV/Ohio border) raged nearly all day and descended into hand-to-hand combat. Lewis's army suffered about 215 casualties, of whom 75 were killed, including Lewis's brother, and 140 wounded. His forces defeated the Ohio Confederacy warriors, who retreated across the Ohio, having lost about 40 warriors. Captain George Mathews of the Virginia militia was credited with a flanking maneuver that initiated Cornstalk's retreat.

=== Treaty of Camp Charlotte ===
After victory at the Point, Dunmore and Lewis advanced from their respective camps into Ohio to within eight miles (13 km) of the Shawnee towns at Pickaway Plains (present Pickaway County, Ohio) on the Scioto. Here they erected the temporary Camp Charlotte on Scippo Creek and met with Cornstalk to begin peace negotiations. By the terms of the Treaty of Camp Charlotte (October 19, 1774), the Shawnee agreed to cease hunting south of the Ohio and to discontinue harassment of travellers on the river. Although Chief Logan said he would cease fighting, he would not attend the formal peace talks. It was here that an agent of Chief Logan (possibly Simon Girty) recited a speech by Logan which became one of the most famous speeches in Indian and Ohio history, dubbed, Logan's Lament.

After the Mingo refused to accept the terms, Major William Crawford attacked their village of Seekunk (Salt Lick Town, now Columbus, Ohio). His force of 240 men destroyed the village. These operations, and the submission of the Shawnee at Camp Charlotte, virtually closed the war.

The treaty was reaffirmed in talks the following year at Fort Pitt, where commissioners from the Continental Congress urged representatives from the Iroquois, Shawnee, Lenape, Wyandot, and Odawa to remain neutral in the growing conflict with Great Britain.

=== Fort Gower Resolves ===
In early November 1774, the army of Virginians arrived back at the point of land formed by confluence of the Ohio and Hocking Rivers and to the makeshift base camp they had established several weeks earlier named Fort Gower (for Earl Gower, a British Lord). There they were informed that the Continental Congress in Philadelphia had enacted a boycott of English goods in response to the Coercive Acts. Recognizing the significance of what was essentially an act of rebellion, the Virginians, in a declaration of the increasing spirit of independence among the colonists, addressing King George and their fellow Virginians, wrote and had published what came to be known as the Fort Gower Resolves. Among the soldiers present were many Virginians that later became famous in the revolution: William Campbell, George Rogers Clark, William Crawford, Simon Kenton, Andrew Lewis, Daniel Morgan, William Russell, Adam Stephen and many others.

At a Meeting of the Officers under the Command of his Excellency the Right Honourable the EARL of DUNMORE, convened at Fort Gower*, November 5, 1774, for the Purpose of considering the Grievances of BRITISH AMERICA, an Officer present addressed the Meeting in the following Words:

GENTLEMEN: Having now concluded the Campaign, by the Assistance of Providence, with Honour and Advantage to the Colony, and ourselves, it only remains that we should give our Country the strongest Assurance that we are ready, at all Times, to the utmost of our Power, to maintain and defend her just Rights and Privileges. We have lived about three Months in the Woods, without any intelligence from Boston, or from the Delegates at Philadelphia. It is possible, from the groundless Reports of designing Men, that our Countrymen may be jealous of the Use such a Body would make of Arms in their Hands at this critical Juncture. That we are a respectable Body is certain, when it is considered that we can live Weeks without Bread or Salt, that we can sleep in the open Air without any Covering but that of the Canopy of Heaven, and that our Men can march and shoot with any in the known World. Blessed with these Talents, let us solemnly engage to one another, and our Country in particular, that we will use them to no Purpose but for the Honour and Advantage of America in general, and of Virginia in particular. It behooves us then, for the Satisfaction of our Country, that we should give them our real Sentiments, by Way of Resolves, at this very alarming Crisis.

Whereupon the Meeting made Choice of a Committee to draw up and prepare Resolves for their Consideration, who immediately withdrew; and after some Time spent therein, reported, that they had agreed to, and prepared the following Resolves, which were read, maturely considered, and agreed to nemine contradicente, by the Meeting, and ordered to be published in the Virginia Gazette:

Resolved, that we will bear the most faithful Allegiance to his Majesty King George III, whilst his Majesty delights to reign over a brave and free People; that we will, at the Expense of Life, and every Thing dear and valuable, exert ourselves in Support of the Honour of his Crown and the Dignity of the British empire. But as the Love of Liberty, and Attachment to the real Interests and just Rights of America outweigh every other Consideration, we resolve that we will exert every Power within us for the Defence of American Liberty, and for the Support of her just Rights and Privileges; not in any precipitate, riotous, or tumultous Manner, but when regularly called forth by the unanimous Voice of our Countrymen.

Resolved, that we entertain the greatest Respect for his Excellency the Right Honourable Lord Dunmore, who commanded the Expedition against the Shawanese; and who, we are confident, underwent the great Fatigue of this singular Campaign from no other Motive than the true Interest of this Country.

Signed by Order, and in Behalf of the whole corps,

BENJAMIN ASHBY,

Clerk.

The Resolves were published in the Virginia Gazette December 22, 1774.

It was the first time colonists had asserted that they were prepared to use force of arms against the Crown to secure their rights—acts which, if executed, would be treason.

These resolves were virtually a declaration of independence in Ohio by Virginia backwoodsmen six months before the shot in Concord "heard round the world" and fully a year and a half before the peal of the Liberty Bell announced the freedom of the colonies.

Dunmore's militia then retreated over the Alleghenies proceeding by Redstone Old Fort and the Great Crossings of the Youghiogheny River to Fort Cumberland, and then to the capitol at Williamsburg.

== Aftermath ==
The peace did not stay for long following the treaty, however. On March 24, 1775, a band of Shawnee who apparently did not recognize the Ohio river boundary attacked Daniel Boone in Kentucky along the Wilderness Road. Nonetheless, by the time of colonial victories at Lexington and Concord, there were several permanent settlements in Kentucke country: Harrod's Town, Boone's Station, Logan's Fort, and Lexington. In May 1776, as the American Revolution got underway, the Shawnee joined dissident Cherokee chief Dragging Canoe in again declaring war on the Virginia colonists. These were the Cherokee–American wars of 1776–1794. Kentucke country would go on to become its own county (1776) and eventually the U.S. state of Kentucky (1792); the northern portion, including Point Pleasant, would become the state of West Virginia.

Fort Gower was abandoned after Dunmore's war. Its present location is believed to be underwater just beyond Hockingport, Ohio. Fort Fincastle, renamed Fort Henry by the colonial militia, along with Fort Pitt and the downstream Fort Harmar in Ohio (1785) became major stepping stones for advancement of the trans-Appalachian frontier during the Cherokee-American and Northwest Indian wars. A series of forts were established at the Point during and after the Revolutionary War; all were abandoned. Settlement along the Allegheny was inhibited until the end of the Indian wars. About that time, a settlement grew up on the Point and was chartered Point Pleasant in 1794.

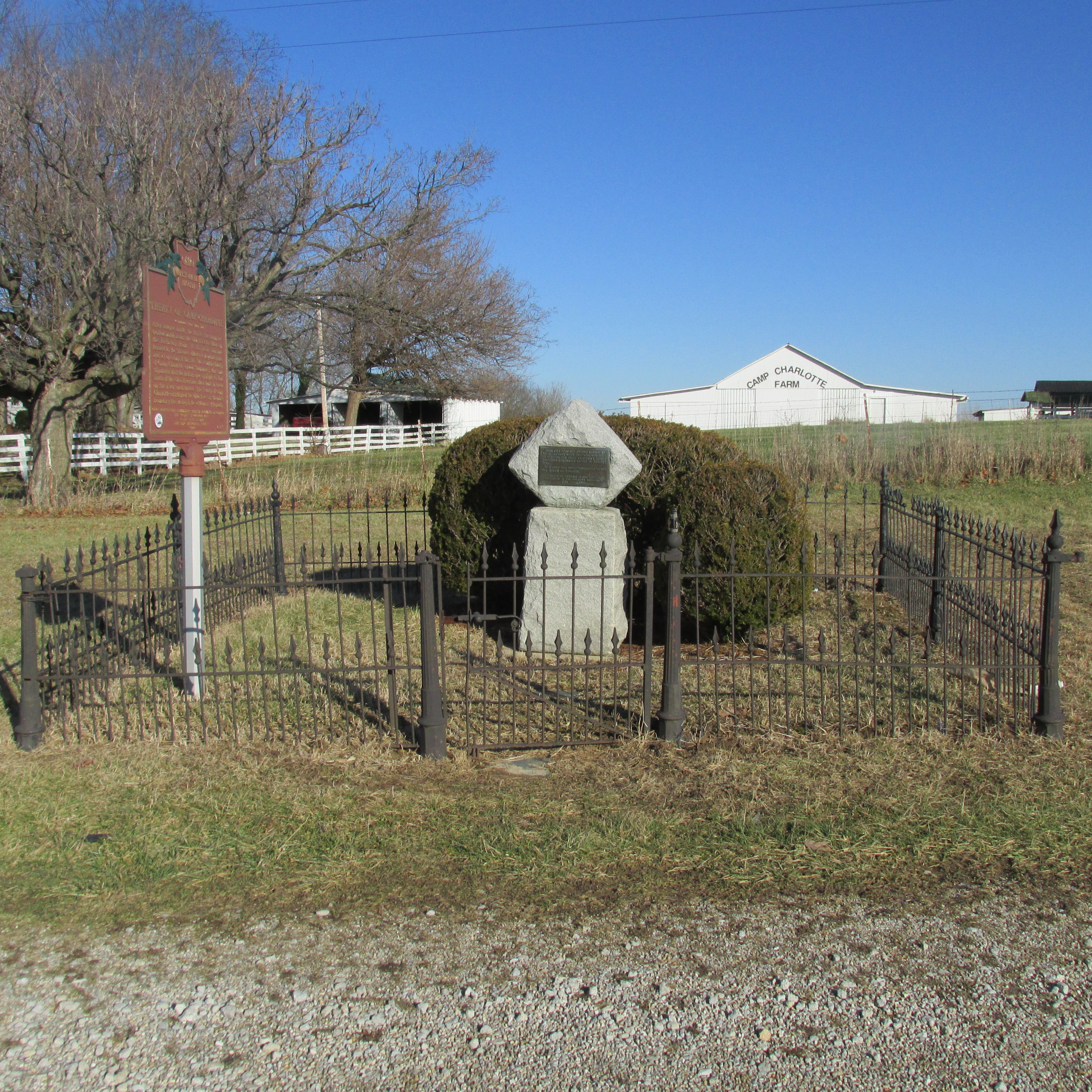
Treaty of Camp Charlotte location spot.

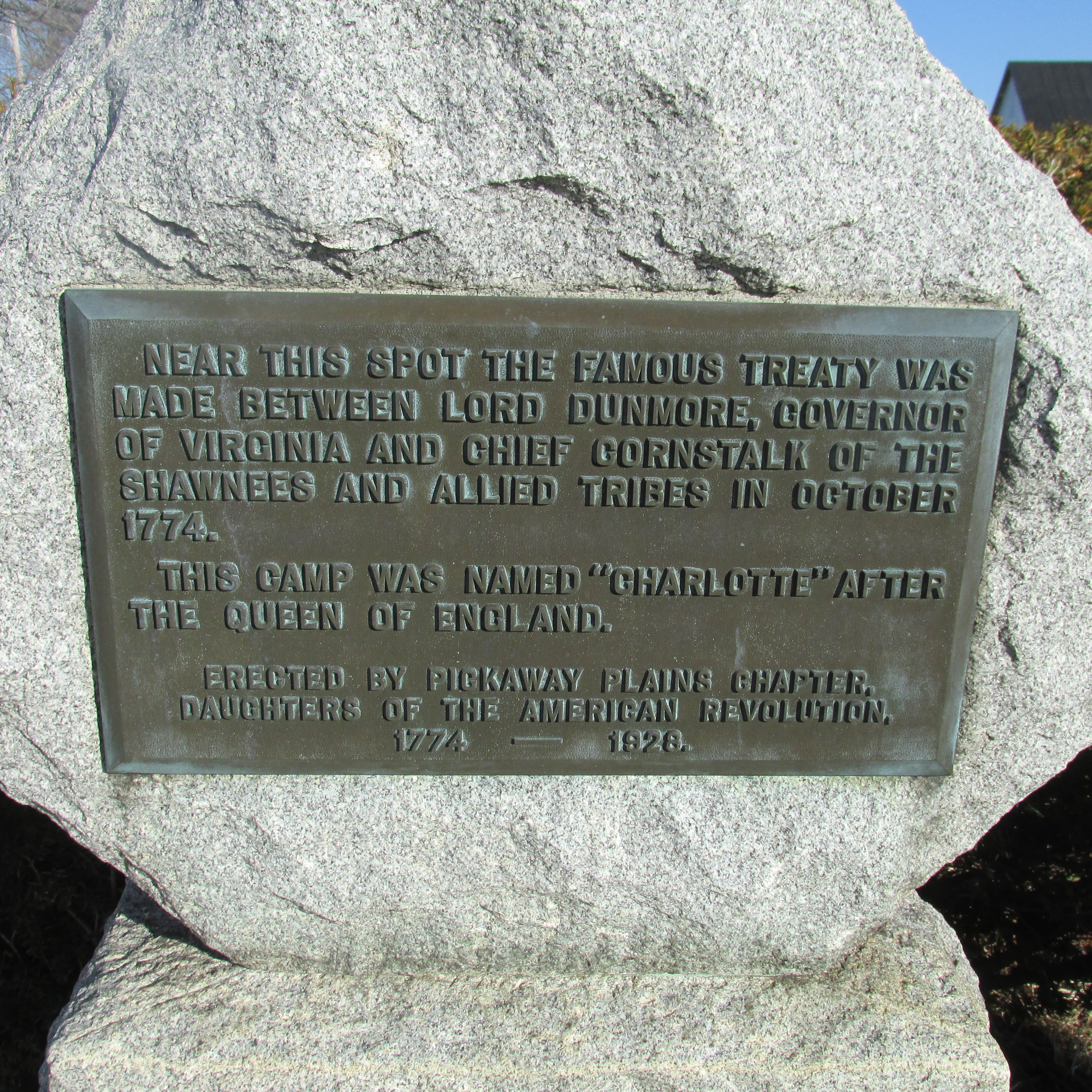
Treaty of Camp Charlotte location plaque.

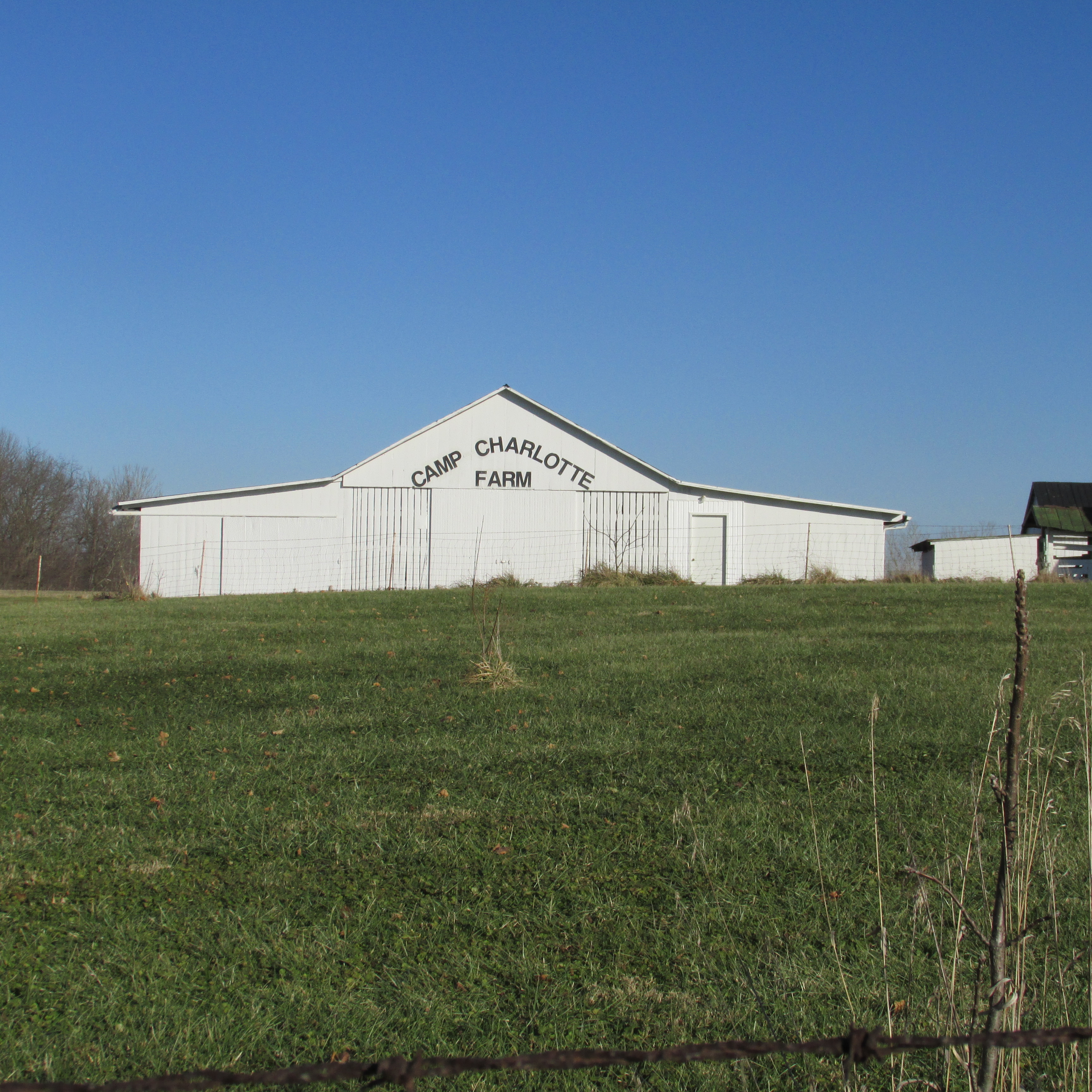
Camp Charlotte Farm.

== See also ==
- Pontiac's War, an earlier rebellion of Native tribes against British forces in the Great Lakes region.
- Dunmore's Proclamation, a Revolutionary war offer of amnesty to slaves who agreed to serve in the British army
- List of American Indian Wars
- Western theater of the American Revolutionary War
- American Indian Wars#Colonial periods (1609–1774)
- Transylvania Colony, a 1775 failed attempt to colonize Kentucke country
- Vandalia (colony), a post-1768 land speculation in the Allegheny Valley
- Fincastle County, trans-Appalachian Virginia including Kentucke country
