= Long knives =

Term for European Americans

"Long knives" was a term used by the Haudenosaunee and later by the Mingo and other indigenous peoples of the Ohio Country to designate white settlers from Virginia, in contradistinction to those of New York and Pennsylvania.

It is a literal translation of the treaty name that the Haudenosaunee first bestowed on Governor Lord Howard in 1684, Assarigoe (variously spelled Assaregoa, Assaragoa, Asharigoua), meaning "cutlass" in Onondaga. This word was chosen as a pun on Howard's name, which sounds like Dutch houwer meaning "cutlass" (similar to the Haudenosaunee choice of the name Onas, or "quill pen", for the Pennsylvania Governors, beginning with William Penn.) This is the very explanation included within official diplomatic correspondence addressed by the Haudenosaunee leaders themselves to then-governor Spotswood in 1722.

George Rogers Clark spoke of himself and men as "Big Knives" or Virginians, in his speeches to the Indians in 1778 after the capture of Illinois. In the latter part of the American Revolutionary War, down to and during the War of 1812, the term was used to designate "Americans".
