= Savivo =

Danish educational software company

Savivo A/S
- Company type: Privately held company
- Industry: Education, e-Learning; Entertainment
- Founded: 2006
- Headquarters: Copenhagen, Denmark
- Area served: Worldwide
- Key people: Stephan Stephensen (CEO)
- Products: English e-Learning Internet application, games
- Members: over 2.000.000
- Parent: Laessoee (Læssøe Holding)
- Website: savivo.com

Savivo is a Danish e-learning company based in Copenhagen. The company was founded in 2006, and is known for their educational games, which has millions of users around the world.

Savivo started out developing content for web browsers, and has since embraced smartphones and tablets running on Android and iOS.

== History ==
Savivo was founded in 2006 by company CEO Stephan Stephensen. The name itself reflects the philosophy of the company. Savivo is a portmanteau of the words savvy and vivo, the Spanish word for life.

The company's first project was the first educational game, Mingoville English, which purpose is to help children learn English. Mingoville English was designed and developed as part of a project initiated by Denmark's IT Center for Education and Research under the auspices of the Danish Ministry of Education.

In 2008 Savivo developed SkoleMat, a series of math games. SkoleMat is designed to cover the entire Danish Folkeskole from pre-school up to lower secondary education. In 2012 the first part of SkoleMat, called Mondiso which covers first to third grade, was released in English.

In 2009 the Portuguese government appointed Savivo to integrate Mingoville English on half a million of Intel’s Classmate PCs in Portugal. 1.000 Classmate PCs were also sent to Botswana.
The same year, Savivo joined the Chilean government's Chile habla Ingles campaign, to combat English illiteracy in Chile. Within two weeks of the campaign, more than 200,000 Chileans signed up for Mingoville English.

In 2011, Savivo approached all major telephone companies in Denmark, e.g. TDC, Telenor, 3 and Telia to enable their Math app for mobile phones to be streamed for free to all school children in Denmark.

In 2012, Savivo entered a partnership with the Danish publishing house Gyldendal, a partnership where the two companies will develop new digital learning content and gain a larger presence abroad.

In 2013, Savivo saw international success. The iPad version of Mingoville Preschool was well received in China, where it held the first place in the highly competitive Chinese app market.
In the beginning of September, Mingoville Preschool started a similar rise to the top in Latin America. The app occupied the top 3 positions in iTunes' education category in a number of countries, e.g. Argentina, Venezuela and Colombia.

== Stephan Stephensen ==
With a background in business, Stephan Stephensen's first foray into e-learning was a program designed to teach refugees Danish. He is responsible for the company's learning philosophy and proponent of e- and m-learning in all their incarnations. The potential of m-learning in various areas of the world, like Africa, is something he continues to explore.

== Learning philosophy ==
Savivo utilizes various teaching approaches in their apps. Besides using gamification elements to increase the time children play the games, Savivo is a proponent for learning through play. Savivo's approach is structured and uses both dialogue and visual elements to stimulate learning.

According to a report created by a series of consultants and Copenhagen Municipality, students feel challenged by Mingoville English and think they learn more English from playing the game. The strong focus on dialogue between child and game are used to explain topics and subjects in a dynamic way.

== Products ==
Year	Title	Platform(s)		
Year	Title	Win/Mac	iOS	Android
2006	Mingoville English	Yes	Yes	Yes
2008	SkoleMat	Yes	Yes	Yes
2012	Mingoville Fun Clock	Yes	Yes	Yes
2012	Mondiso	Yes	Yes	Yes
2013	Mingoville Preschool	Yes	Yes	Yes
2013	Mingoville Storytelling	Yes	Yes	Yes

=== Mingoville English ===
Mingoville English is Savivo's biggest program, with over 2.000.000 users around the world. It combines a set of 10 missions, totaling hundreds of English exercises and games, with a virtual world where children can talk and play together. In the virtual world, the safety of the children is guaranteed thanks to Savivo's Safe Chat-system, which only allows pre-approved words to be used.

Mingoville English features voice acting with voice actors from both North America, Australia and the UK. Native voice actors ensure that the children are exposed to as authentic an English experience as possible. Mingoville English was developed with the assistance of English teachers and the program has a comprehensive system for handling lesson plans, homework and grading.

While Mingoville English is the flagship of Savivo, the universe and activities have spun off several other games and apps. Most notably the Mingoville Preschool app, which shortly after release climbed the Chinese App Store and claimed the first place.

Though Mingoville English was developed for web browsers, a new and enhanced version of Mingoville English is being developed for both web, iOS and Android.

=== Mingoville Fun Clock ===
Mingoville Fun Clock is an app designed to teach children how to tell time. Mingoville Fun Clock features voice actors in English, Chinese, French, Italian, Spanish, German, Dutch, Danish, Swedish and Norwegian.

=== Mingoville Preschool ===
Mingoville Preschool is designed to introduce children aged 4–8 to their first English words and phrases. The activities included in Mingoville Preschool range from variations of memory games to word puzzles.

=== Mingoville Storytelling ===
Mingoville Storytelling is a storytelling app, in which children are encouraged to listen to stories set in the Mingoville universe, retell them and finally write their own stories using any of the unlocked pictures and their own voice.

=== SkoleMat ===
SkoleMat comprises three parts, Mondiso, Hexaville and Pitropolis. Each part has a unique theme to engage the children and which ties into the exercises.

==== Mondiso ====
Mondiso, which is for students ages 6–8 years, introduces children to basic math such as addition, subtraction and multiplication. The game is set on the island of Mondiso, which is inhabited by strange and colorful monsters.

Mondiso is available in both Danish and English.

==== Hexaville ====
Hexaville covers the curriculum for ages 10–13 and teach children about geometry, equations and coordinates. Hexaville takes place at a Harry Potter-inspired school with witches, ghosts and magic.

Hexaville is only available in Danish.

==== Pitropolis ====
Pitropolis, for the 13- to 16-year-old, expands of the two previous parts and teaches about economy, Pythagoras and fractions. In Pitropolis the player follow the young people Alex and Monica, and their everyday lives.

Pitropolis is only available in Danish.

== Awards and conferences ==
- 2007 Stephan Stephensen attended the New Media Days in Copenhagen. The topic of his talk was "Can internet advertising provide education to children?".
- 2011 Stephan Stephensen attended the Learning Without Frontiers' Sunday Service, where the topic of his talk was "Learning English in a Virtual World".
- 2011 Savivo was awarded the Danish Mobile Award, in recognition for making an extraordinary impact on mobile technology.
- 2013 Savivo won the “Best MoBiz and innovative Enterprise Award” at the Global Mobile Internet Conference.
- 2013 Savivo will attend the Language Show Live in London. The topic of their talk will be "The impact of gamification on education".
- 2013 Stephan Stephensen wil speak at the Media & Learning conference in Brussels.
