= Michael Cresap =

Continental Army officer (1742–1775)

- Born: 17 April 1742; Maryland, British America
- Died: 18 October 1775 (aged 33) New York City, New York, Great Britain
- Buried: New York City, New York, United States
- Allegiance: United Colonies
- Service years: 1775

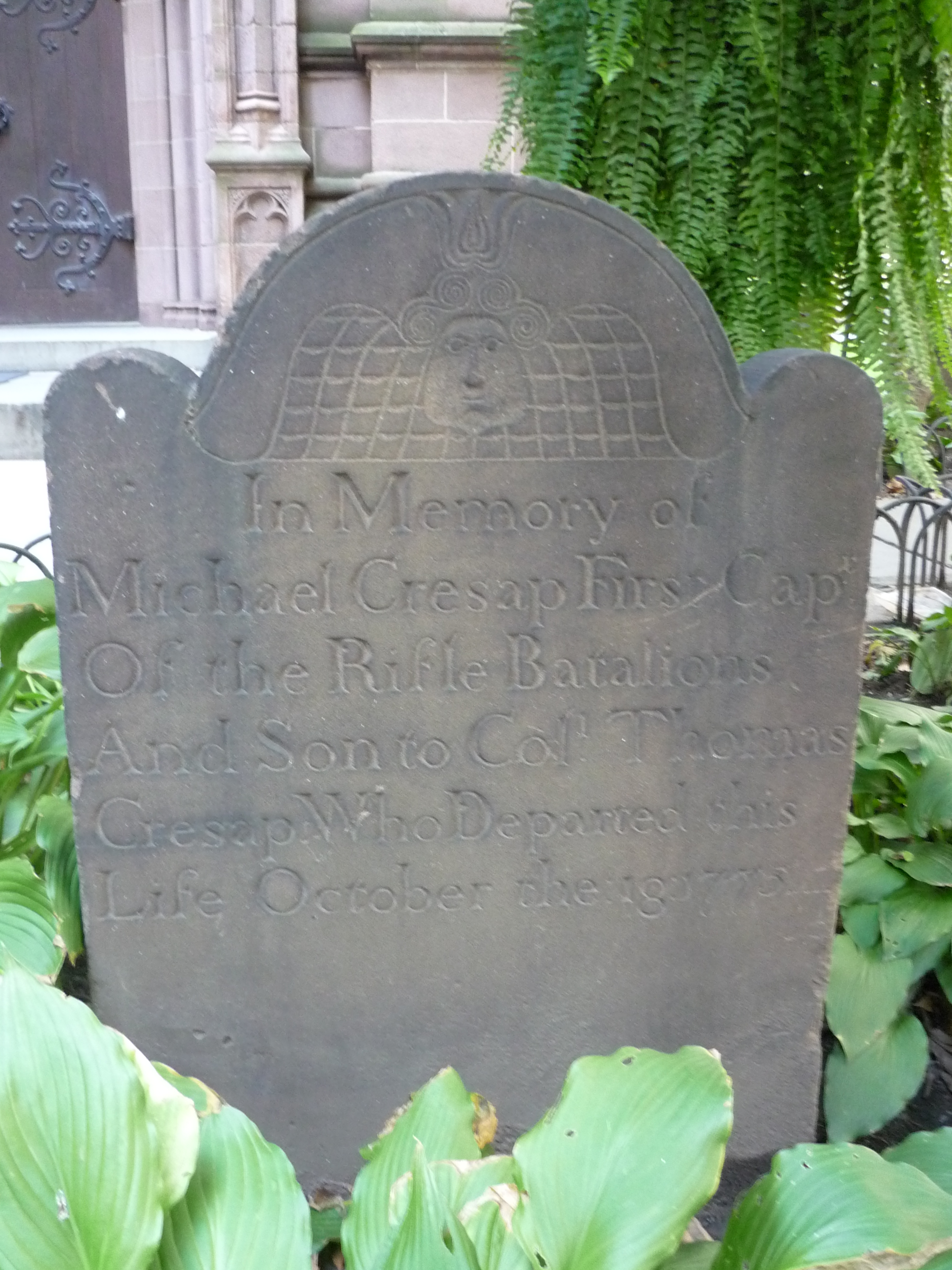
Michael Cresap's gravestone at Trinity Church Cemetery, New York City.

Michael Cresap (April 17, 1742 – October 18, 1775) was a frontiersman born in Maryland, British America.

== Biography ==
Cresap was the son of the pioneer Colonel Thomas Cresap. He spent part of his adult years in the Ohio Country as a trader and land developer. He led several raids against Native Americans who were hostile to white settlement. In April 1774, rumors spread that members of the Cherokee tribe had murdered several settlers along the frontier. Cresap, believing the rumors, was apparently involved in a reprisal raid, and he or some of his followers killed two or three Mingo in the vicinity of Captina Creek, in present-day Ohio. None of the natives killed were in fact Cherokee. The war leader Logan of the Mingo, accused Cresap of murdering his family. Logan's wife and pregnant sister were among those murdered. In fact, the killings were almost certainly perpetrated by Daniel Greathouse, yet Cresap was immortalized in the famous speech, Logan's Lament attributed to the chief — quoted in Thomas Jefferson's Notes on the State of Virginia (1785) — as the murderer of Logan's family.

As a result of the murders, Logan waged war on the settlements along the Ohio and in western Pennsylvania, killing, perhaps, nearly thirty men, women and children. Lord Dunmore, the Governor of Virginia, raised an army and appointed Cresap to the rank of Captain. The decisive battle of Lord Dunmore's War was the Battle of Point Pleasant in Virginia (now West Virginia). Dunmore's forces defeated a band of Shawnee led by Cornstalk.

After Lord Dunmore's War, Cresap returned to Maryland and subsequently raised a company of riflemen for the Continental Army during the American Revolution. He died from illness in New York City while in the service of the army; he is interred there in Trinity Church Cemetery.

== Legacy ==
- The Michael Cresap House (c. 1764) — Cresap's stone and brick house in western Maryland — was listed on the National Register of Historic Places in 1972.
- The Cresap Rifle Club, a non-profit shooting range in Frederick, Maryland, has been open for almost a century and bears the surname of Michael Cresap.

== See also ==
- Captina Creek
