= Piscataway =

Piscataway may refer to:

- Maryland (place)
  - Piscataway, Maryland, an unincorporated community
  - Piscataway Creek, Maryland
  - Piscataway Park, historical park at the mouth of Piscataway Creek
  - Siege of Piscataway, siege of Susquehannock fort south of Piscataway Creek
- Maryland (people)
  - Piscataway people, an Indigenous tribe from the southern Mid-Atlantic States
  - Piscataway language
  - Piscataway-Conoy Tribe of Maryland, state-recognized tribe in Maryland
  - Piscataway Indian Nation and Tayac Territory, state-recognized tribe in Maryland
- New Jersey
  - Piscataway, New Jersey, a township
- Virginia
  - Piscataway Creek (Virginia), about 55 miles south of Piscataway Creek, MD

== See also ==
- Piscataqua (disambiguation)
