= John Connolly (loyalist) =

- Born: c. 1741; Lancaster County, Pennsylvania
- Died: 1813; Montreal, Lower Canada
- Known for: Loyalist during the American Revolution

John Connolly (c. 1741–1813) was an American Loyalist during the American Revolution.

Connolly, a man of English descent, was born in Lancaster County, Pennsylvania to an Irish Catholic father who served in the British Army. He is best known for a plan he concocted with Virginia Governor Lord Dunmore to raise a regiment of loyalists and Natives in Canada called the Loyal Foresters and lead them to Virginia to help Dunmore put down the rebellion. In the early 1770s Connolly was the leading figure at the Forks of the Ohio in present-day Western Pennsylvania in Virginia's claims to the region surrounding Pittsburgh. He was even arrested by the Westmoreland County, Pennsylvania Sheriff for inciting pioneers to ally with Virginia and released on the condition that he would return for trial and stop his crusade only to capture Fort Pitt and declare it for Virginia. Connolly was traveling from Williamsburg, Virginia to Fort Detroit to carry out this plan when he was captured in Hagerstown, Maryland on 20 November 1775.

In 1780 his property was seized by the revolutionaries and became Louisville, Kentucky. Later that year he was released in a prisoner exchange, but was again captured in 1781. In 1782 he was released following the end of the war, sailed to England, then crossed the Atlantic again, settling in Montreal. In 1788 he returned to Louisville as a British secret agent and unsuccessfully attempted to convince the locals to secede from the United States. He was advised to return to Canada at once if he valued his life, and did so. He died there in 1813.
