= Mingo =

Native American grouping from Ohio

Ohio Seneca chief Deep Lake, by George Catlin

The Mingo are a grouping of Haudenosaunee, primarily Seneca and Cayuga, who migrated west from New York to the Ohio Country in the mid-18th century, and their descendants. Some Susquehannock people were also included. Anglo-Americans called these migrants mingos, a corruption of mingwe, an Eastern Algonquian name for Iroquoian-language groups in general. The Mingo have also been called "Ohio Iroquois" and "Ohio Seneca".

Most were forced to move from Ohio to Indian Territory in the early 1830s under the federal Indian Removal program. At the turn of the 20th century, they lost control of communal lands when property was allocated to individual households in a government assimilation effort related to the Dawes Act (1887) and extinguishing Indian claims to prepare for the admission of Oklahoma as a state (1907).

In the 1930s, Mingo descendants reorganized as a tribe with self-government. They were recognized by the federal government in 1937 as the Seneca–Cayuga Tribe of Oklahoma.

== Etymology ==
The name Mingo derives from the Delaware (Lenape) word, mingwe or Minque, as adapted from their Lenape language, meaning "sneaky" or "stealthy". The terms Minqua or Minquaa were used interchangeably to refer to the five nations of the Haudenosaunee League, to the Susquehannock and to Iroquoian-speaking peoples in general. "Mingo" has been described as an ethnic slur by Phyllis E. Wms. Bardeau and criticized as inaccurately dividing the Haudenosaunee of the Ohio Country from the rest of the League.

Their endonym may have been the Seneca language term Gá:hgwa’gé:onö’, resulting in the uncommon alternative English name Gahgwa. However the term may instead refer to the Erie, Wenro, Meskwaki or Neutral Confederacy.

== History ==
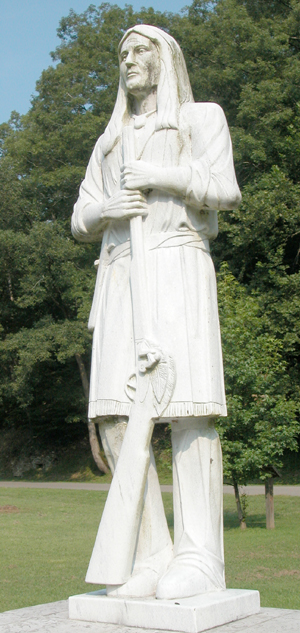
Statue of Chief Logan, a notable Mingo leader, in Logan, West Virginia

The people who became called by European settlers as Mingo migrated to the Ohio Country along the Ohio River in the mid-eighteenth century, part of a movement of Haudenosaunee league members away from European encroachment in Pennsylvania. The region had been sparsely populated for decades but controlled as a hunting ground by the Haudenosaunee. The "Mingo dialect" that dominated the Ohio Valley from the late 17th to early 18th centuries is considered a variant of Seneca language.

After the French and Indian War (1754-1763), France was defeated and ceded its lands east of the Mississippi River to Great Britain. Many Cayuga people of the Five Nations also moved to Ohio, where the British granted them a reservation along the Sandusky River. They were joined there by the Algonquian-speaking Shawnee of Ohio. Their villages were increasingly a mosaic of Seneca, Cayuga and other league members, including many League adoptees such as the Wyandots, Susquehannock, Tutelo, Piscataway, Shawnee and Lenape.

The Haudenosaunee Confederacy had claimed hunting rights and sovereignty over much of the Ohio River Valley since the late 17th century, these peoples in Ohio often had to act independently due to their unique geopolitical situation. When Pontiac's Rebellion broke out in 1763 against the British at the end of the French and Indian War, many Mingo joined with other nations in an attempt to drive the British out of the Ohio Country. At that time, most of the six Haudenosaunee nations based in New York (who then numbered six, as the Tuscarora had joined them from the South about 1722) were closely allied to the British because of their lucrative fur trading. Guyasuta (c. 1725–c. 1794), a Royaner of the Seneca, was one of the leaders in Pontiac's War.

Another famous Cayuga leader was Chief Logan (c. 1723–1780), who had good relations with European settlers. He was not a war chief, but a village leader. In 1774, as tensions between settlers and natives were on the rise due to a series of violent conflicts, a band of European outlaws murdered his family. Local leaders counseled restraint, but acknowledged his right to revenge. He conducted a series of raids against settlers with a dozen followers.

Logan did not participate in the resulting Lord Dunmore's War. He was not likely to have been at the climactic Battle of Point Pleasant. Rather than take part in the peace conference, he expressed his thoughts about the encroachment by Europeans in "Logan's Lament." His speech was printed and widely distributed. It is one of the most well-known examples of Native American oratory.

Good Hunter, an Ohio Seneca warrior, painted by George Catlin

By 1830, the Mingo were flourishing in western Ohio, where they had improved their farms and established schools and other civic institutions. After the US passed the Indian Removal Act in that same year, the government pressured the Mingo to sell their lands and migrate west of the Mississippi River to Kansas, which they did in 1832. In Kansas, the various nations that were called Mingo had to share the Neosho Reservation and consolidate.

In 1869, after the American Civil War, the US government pressed for Indian removal of these tribes from Kansas to Indian Territory (present-day Oklahoma). They moved to present-day Ottawa County, Oklahoma. In 1881, a group of Cayuga from Canada joined the Seneca in Indian Territory. In 1902, several years before Oklahoma Territory was admitted as a state, 372 members of the joint tribe received individual land allotments under a federal program to extinguish communal tribal land holdings so that statehood could take place, and to encourage assimilation to the European-American model. This resulted in a considerable loss of their lands in the following decades.

In 1937 after the Oklahoma Indian Welfare Act was passed, the descendants of the Seneca and Cayuga reorganized to re-establish self-government. They named themselves the Seneca-Cayuga Tribe of Oklahoma and became federally recognized.

Today, the tribe numbers over 5,000 members. They continue to maintain political affiliation with the League, which have been based largely in Ontario, Canada since after the American Revolutionary War. At the time, Great Britain ceded its territory south of the Great Lakes and east of the Mississippi River to the newly independent American states, including most of the lands controlled by the Haudenosaunee in New York and Pennsylvania. Some of the Six Nations also have bands with reservations in New York State, their original homeland. In the US, these governments are recognized as separate tribes.

== In popular culture ==
Logan and the Mingo in the period following Lord Dunmore's War are featured prominently in the Gothic novel Logan (1822) by John Neal. The story can be read as issuing an indictment of American imperialism by depicting Indigenous genocide as central to the American story.
