= Logan Elm Village, Ohio =

- CDP
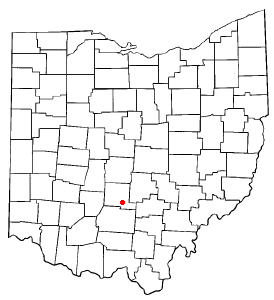
- Location of Logan Elm Village, Ohio

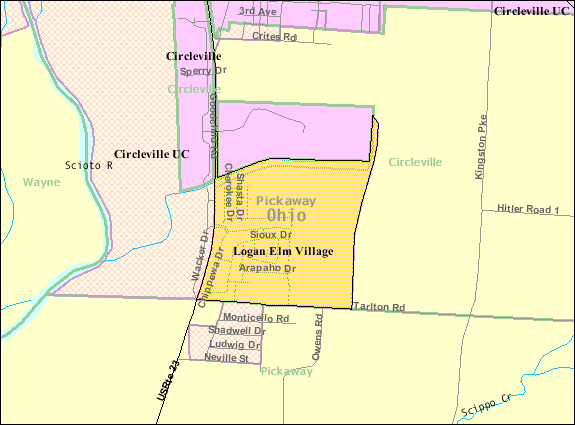
- Detailed map of Logan Elm Village
- Coordinates: 39°34′13″N 82°56′50″W
- Country: United States
- State: Ohio
- County: Pickaway
- Township: Circleville

Area
  - Total: 0.36 sq mi (0.94 km^{2})
  - Land: 0.36 sq mi (0.94 km^{2})
  - Water: 0 sq mi (0.00 km^{2})
- Elevation: 692 ft (211 m)

Population (2020)
  - Total: 1,045
  - Density: 2,877.9/sq mi (1,111.17/km^{2})
- Time zone: UTC-5 (Eastern (EST))
  - Summer (DST): UTC-4 (EDT)
- FIPS code: 39-44636
- GNIS feature ID: 2393106

Logan Elm Village is a census-designated place (CDP) in Pickaway County, Ohio, United States, near the site of the Logan Elm. As of the 2020 census, Logan Elm Village had a population of 1,045.

"Logan elm" originally referred to a large individual elm tree where Logan the Orator gave a speech.

== Geography ==
According to the United States Census Bureau, the CDP has a total area of 0.5 square miles (1.3 km^{2}), all of it land.

== Demographics ==
Historical population
Census	Pop.	Note	%±
2020	1,045		—
U.S. Decennial Census

As of the census of 2000, there were 1,062 people, 425 households, and 295 families residing in the CDP. The population density was 2,073.2 inhabitants per square mile (800.5/km^{2}). There were 438 housing units at an average density of 855.0 per square mile (330.1/km^{2}). The racial makeup of the CDP was 96.70% White, 1.79% African American, 0.09% Native American, 0.75% Asian, 0.09% from other races, and 0.56% from two or more races. Hispanic or Latino people of any race were 0.75% of the population.

There were 425 households, out of which 27.1% had children under the age of 18 living with them, 56.2% were married couples living together, 10.6% had a female householder with no husband present, and 30.4% were non-families. 28.2% of all households were made up of individuals, and 17.6% had someone living alone who was 65 years of age or older. The average household size was 2.32 and the average family size was 2.79.

In the CDP the population was spread out, with 21.6% under the age of 18, 5.6% from 18 to 24, 23.3% from 25 to 44, 28.0% from 45 to 64, and 21.6% who were 65 years of age or older. The median age was 44 years. For every 100 females there were 82.5 males. For every 100 females age 18 and over, there were 74.3 males.

The median income for a household in the CDP was $39,250, and the median income for a family was $48,558. Males had a median income of $39,911 versus $25,208 for females. The per capita income for the CDP was $17,584. About 7.4% of families and 10.6% of the population were below the poverty line, including 20.0% of those under the age of 18 and 11.0% of those 65 and older.
