= Logan Elm =

One of the largest known American elm trees

Coordinates: 39°30′35″N 82°57′22″W

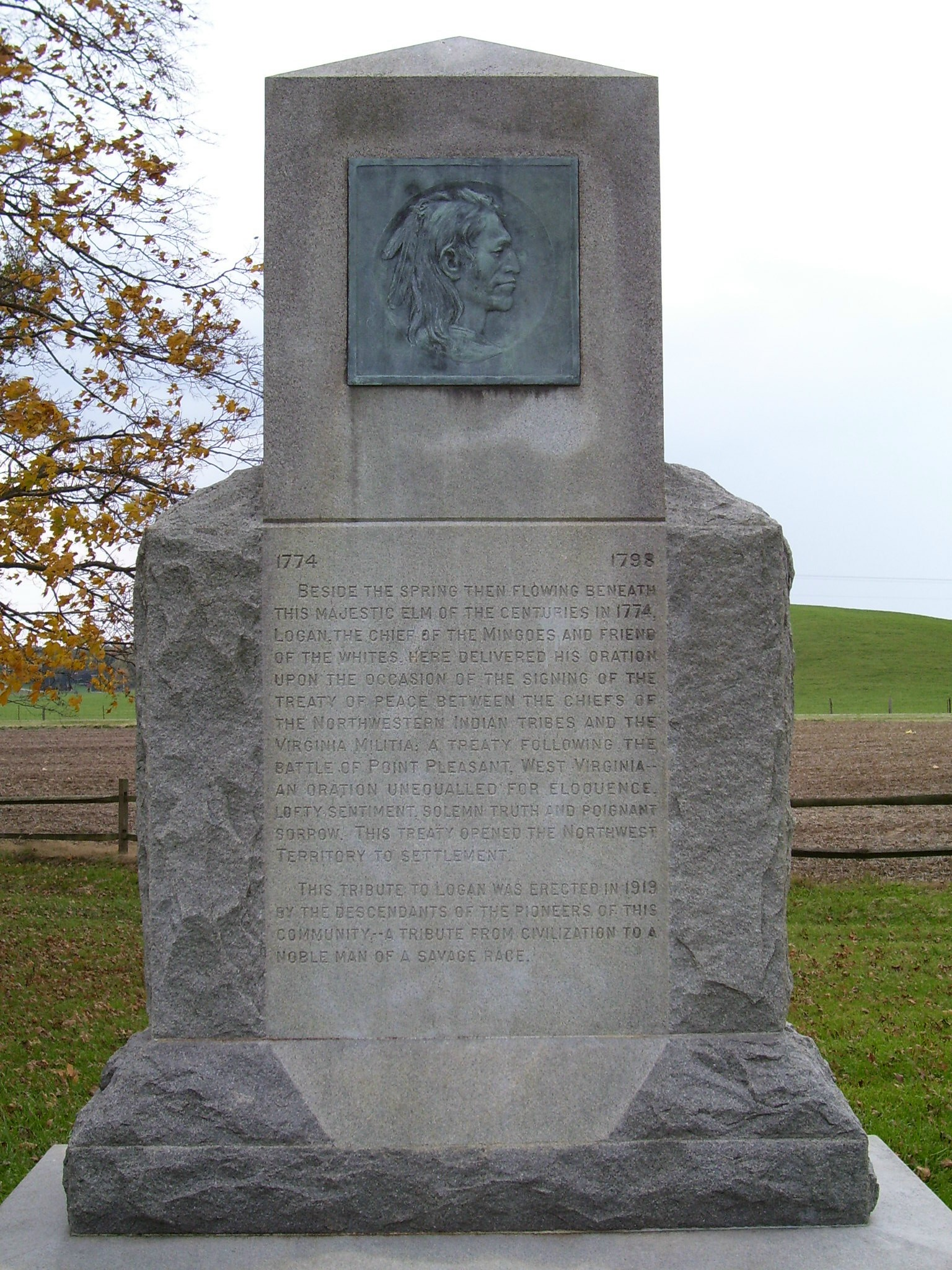
Monument to Logan at the Logan Elm State Memorial in Ohio. The text of "Logan's Lament" is inscribed on the other side of the monument.

The Logan Elm that stood near Circleville in Pickaway County, Ohio, was one of the largest American elm trees (Ulmus americana) recorded. The 65-foot-tall (20 m) tree had a trunk circumference of 24 feet (7.3 m) and a crown spread of 180 feet (55 m). Weakened by Dutch elm disease, the tree died from storm damage in 1964. The Logan Elm State Memorial commemorates the site and preserves various associated markers and monuments. The memorial is owned by the Ohio History Connection.

According to tradition, Chief Logan of the Mingo tribe delivered a passionate speech at a peace-treaty meeting under this elm in 1774, said to be the most famous speech ever given by a Native American, now known as "Logan's Lament":

I appeal to any white man to say, if ever he entered Logan's cabin hungry, and he gave him not meat; if ever he came cold and naked, and he clothed him not. During the course of the last long and bloody war, Logan remained idle in his cabin, an advocate for peace. Such was my love for the whites, that my countrymen pointed as they passed, and said, Logan is the friend of the white men. I have even thought to live with you but for the injuries of one man. Col. Cresap, the last spring, in cold blood, and unprovoked, murdered all the relations of Logan, not sparing even my women and children. There runs not a drop of my blood in the veins of any living creature. This has called on me for revenge. I have sought it: I have killed many: I have fully glutted my vengeance. For my country, I rejoice at the beams of peace. But do not harbour a thought that mine is the joy of fear. Logan never felt fear. He will not turn on his heel to save his life. Who is there to mourn for Logan? Not one.

The village of Logan Elm and the Logan Elm High School are located nearby.

The 29th annual celebration of the Logan Elm was held on October 5, 1941. Among those in attendance was poet, Frank Grubbs, who recited the poem that he wrote for the occasion. He is referred to in the article as the poet laureate of Ohio.

THE LOGAN ELM

In stately majesty it stands,
Its sturdy branches spread
As if to cloister in its folds
The living and the dead;
Time and the ruthless hands of men
It mates have known,
Until it rears its hoary head
In solitude alone.
O, ancient elm! When Logan stood
Beneath thy kindly shade,
He little dreamed his eloquence
For him a shrine had made;
Tho' many moons have waxed and waned
Since he, his story told,
The great tree flourishes as green
As in the days of old.
'Tis said when Indian Summer blooms
Are tinting hills and downs,
The spirit of the warrior comes
Back from his "hunting grounds"
To smoke once more "the pipe of peace"
Beneath this ancient tree,
That stands a land-mark and a shrine
To the Mingo's memory.

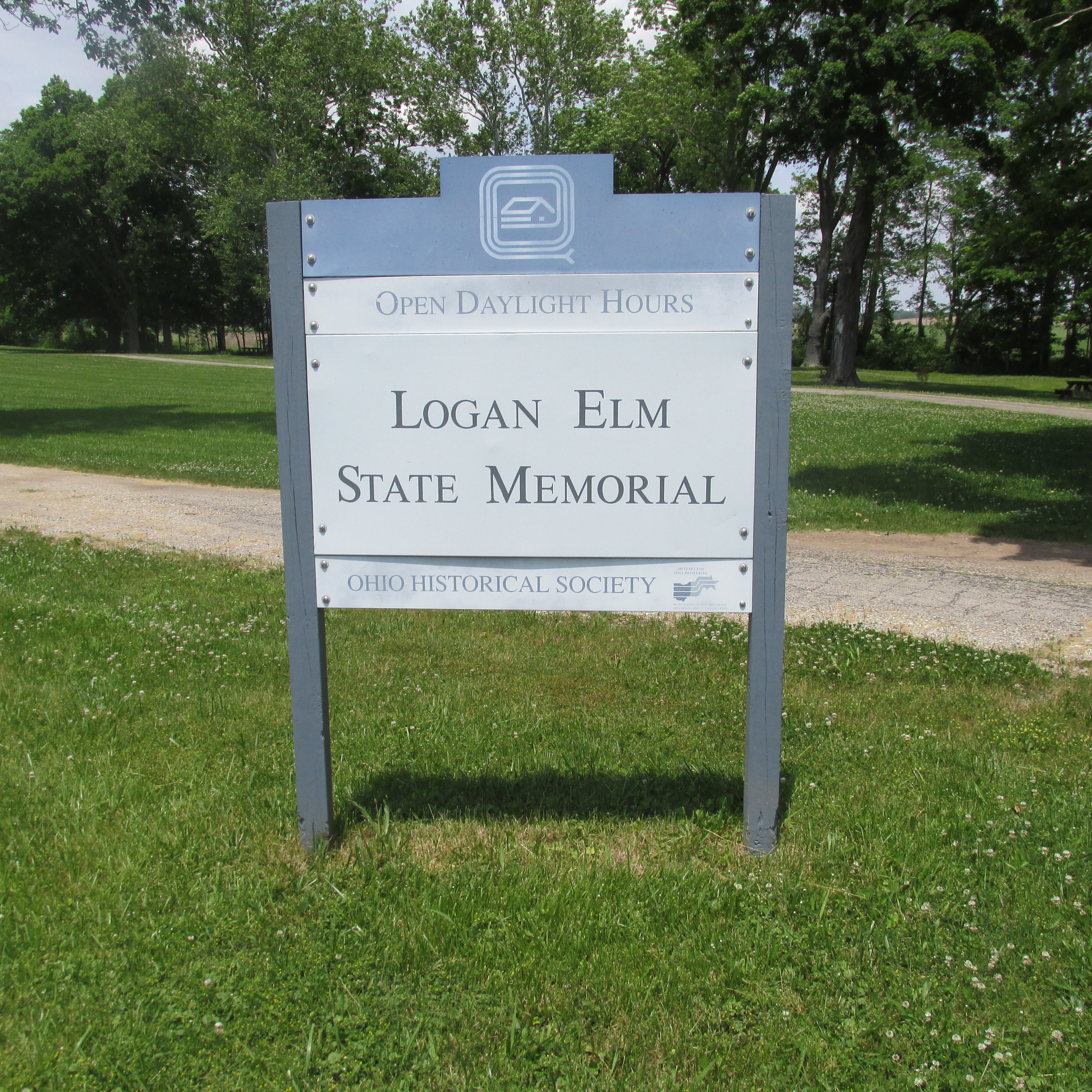
Logan Elm State Memorial

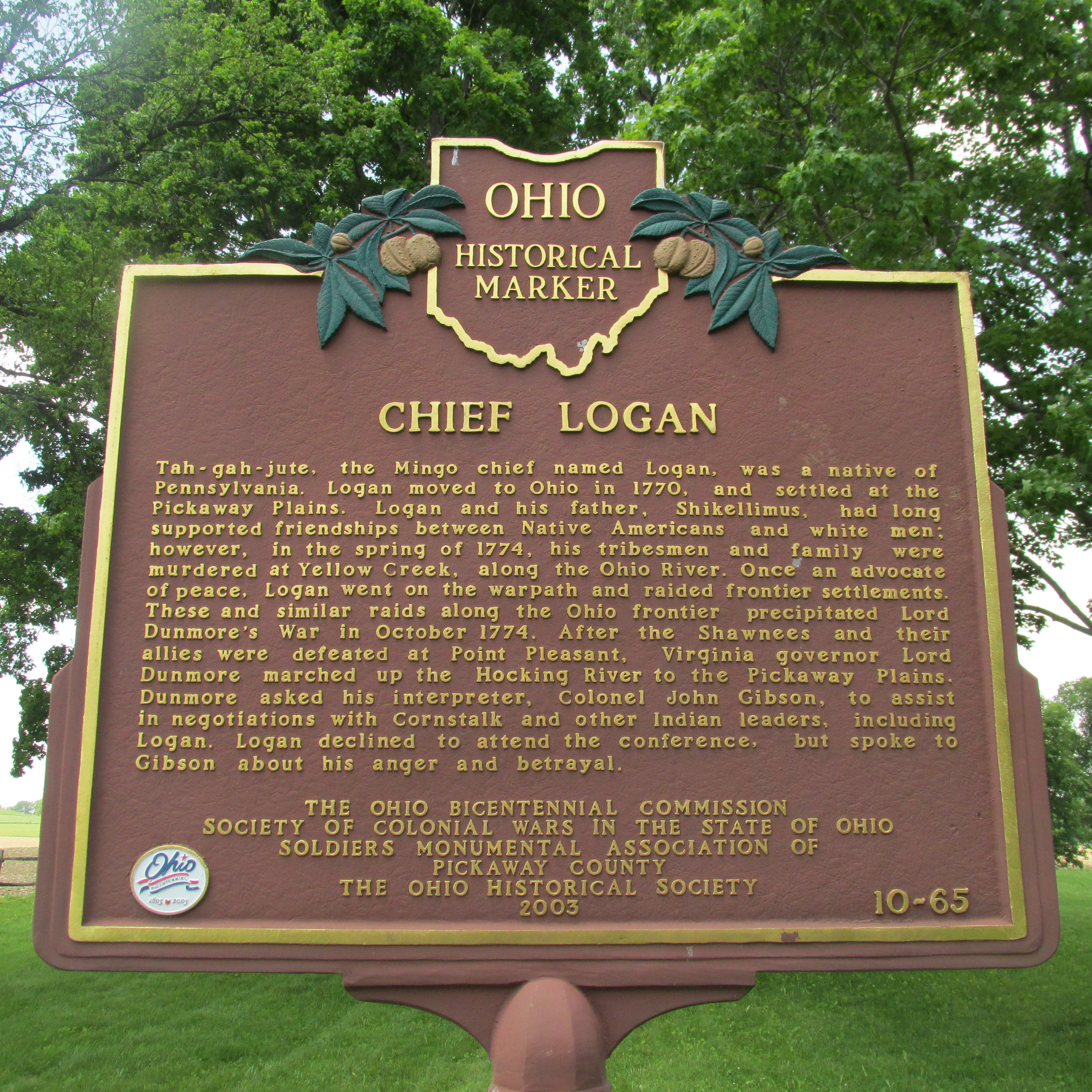
Chief Logan Ohio Historical Marker

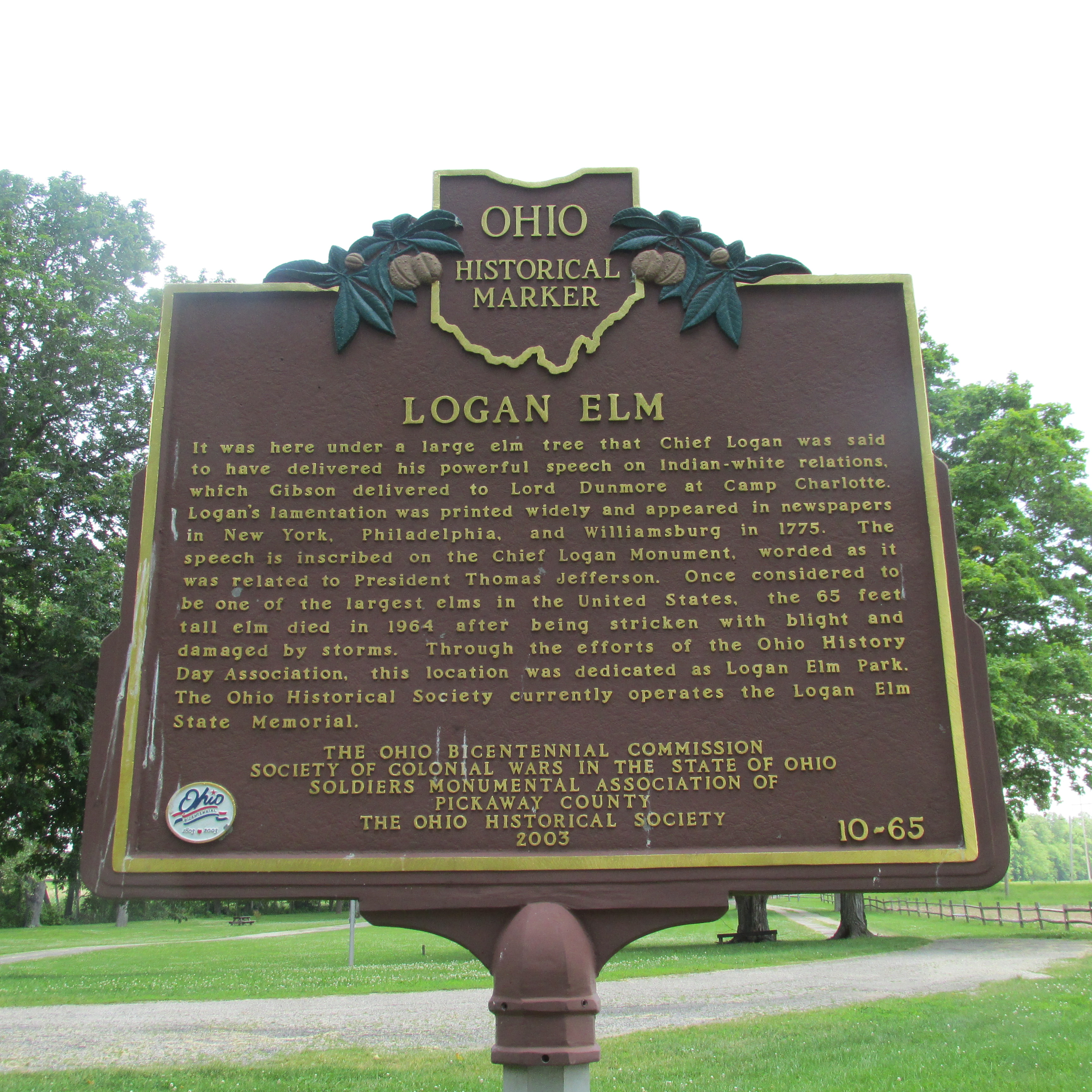
Logan Elm Ohio Historical Marker

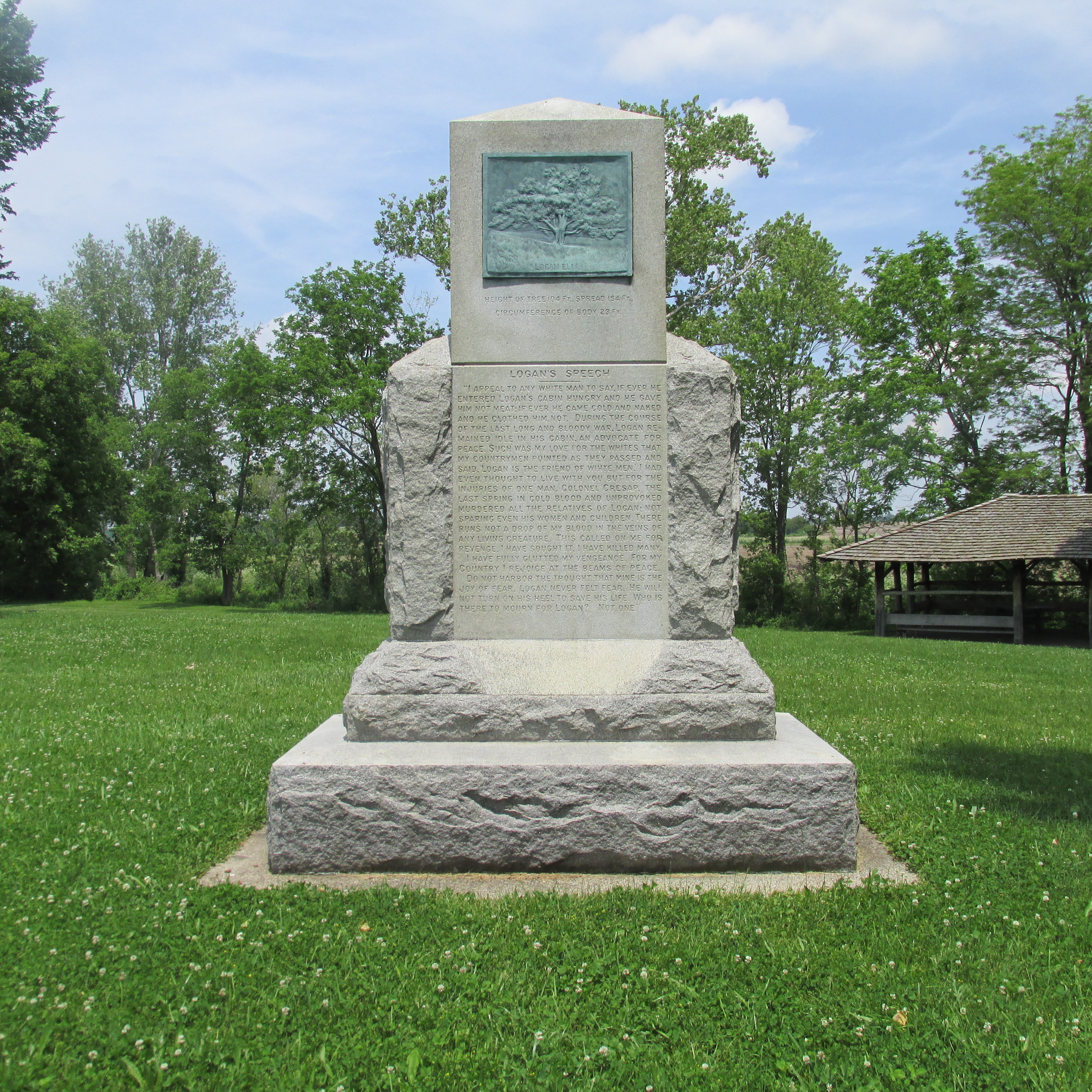
Logan monument

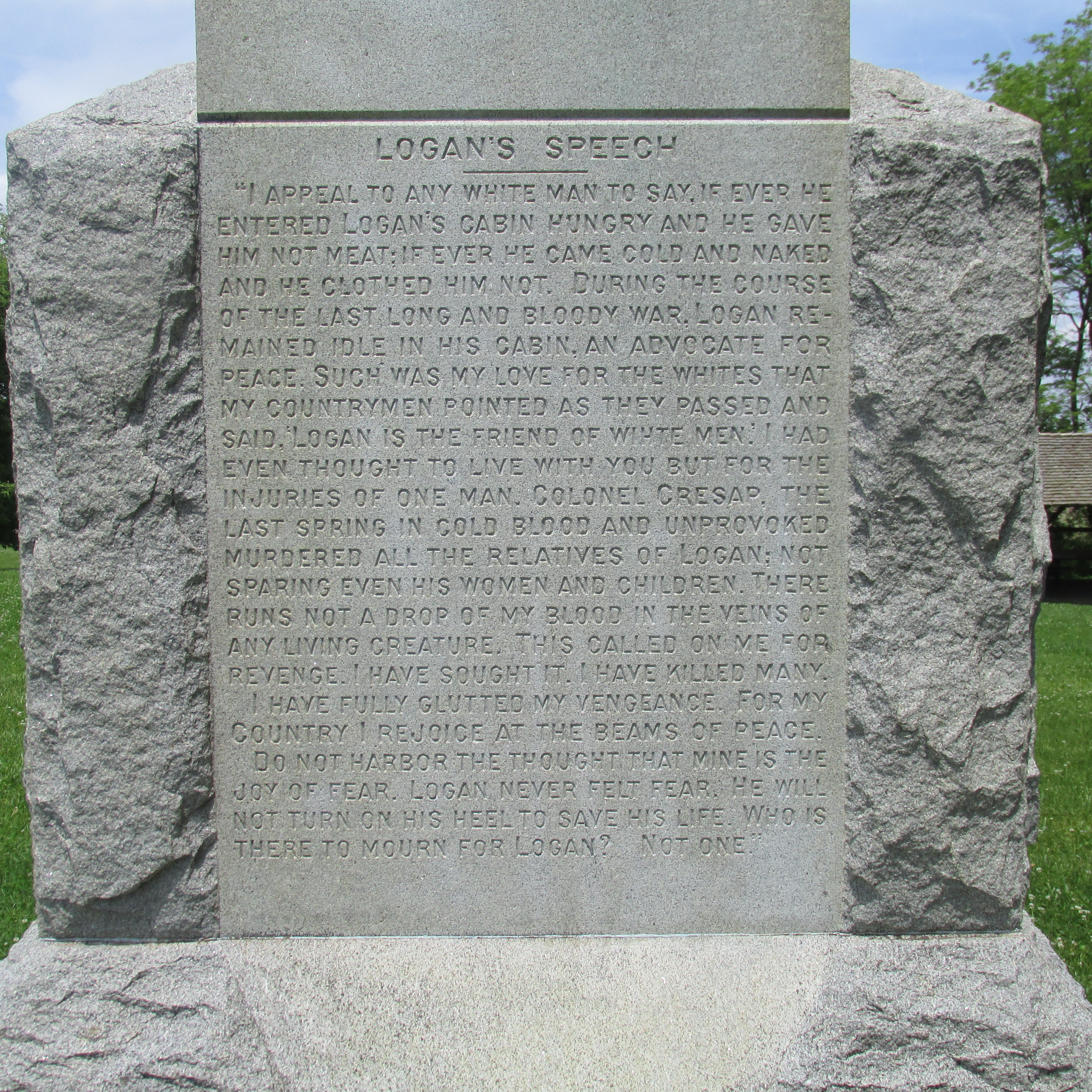
Logan monument

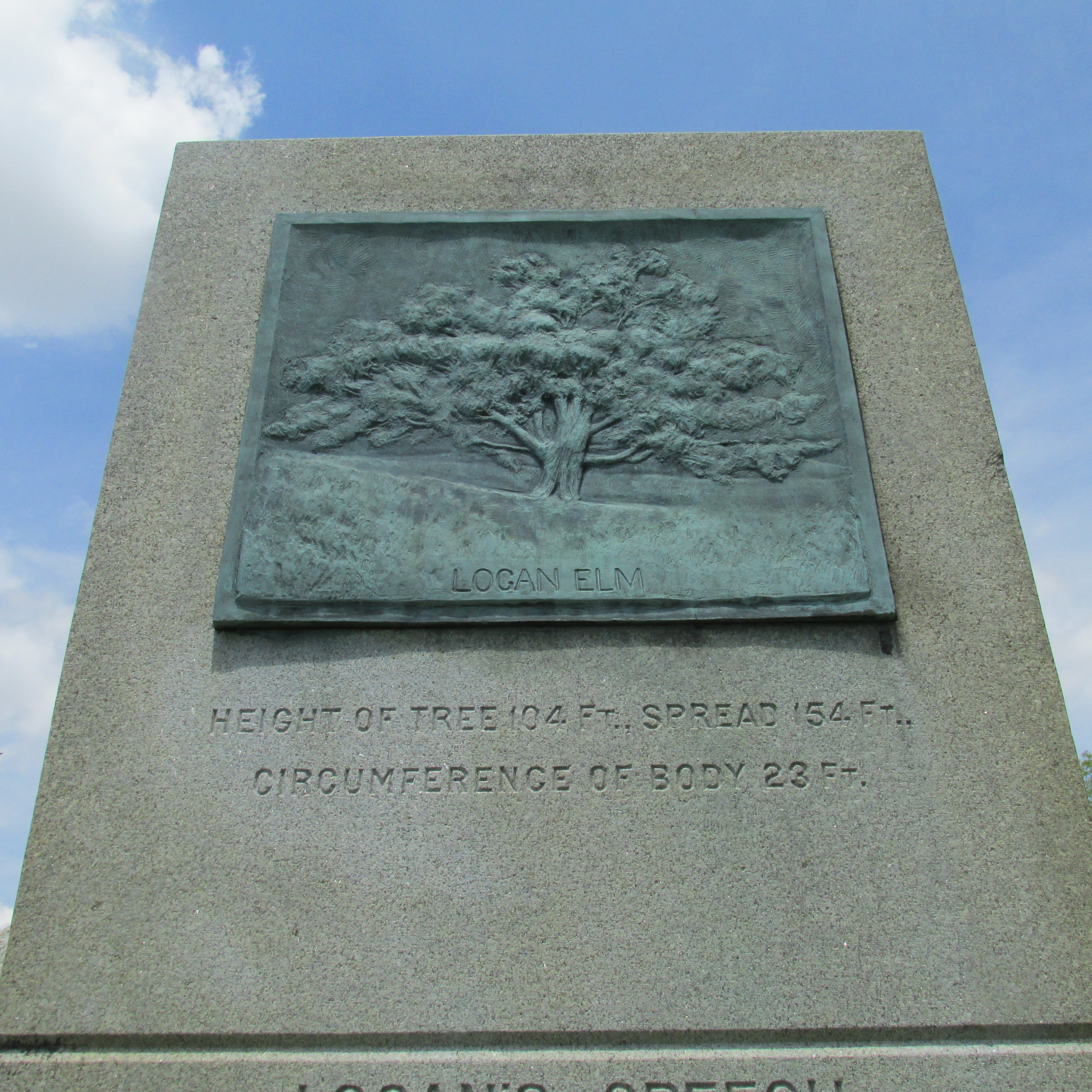
Logan monument

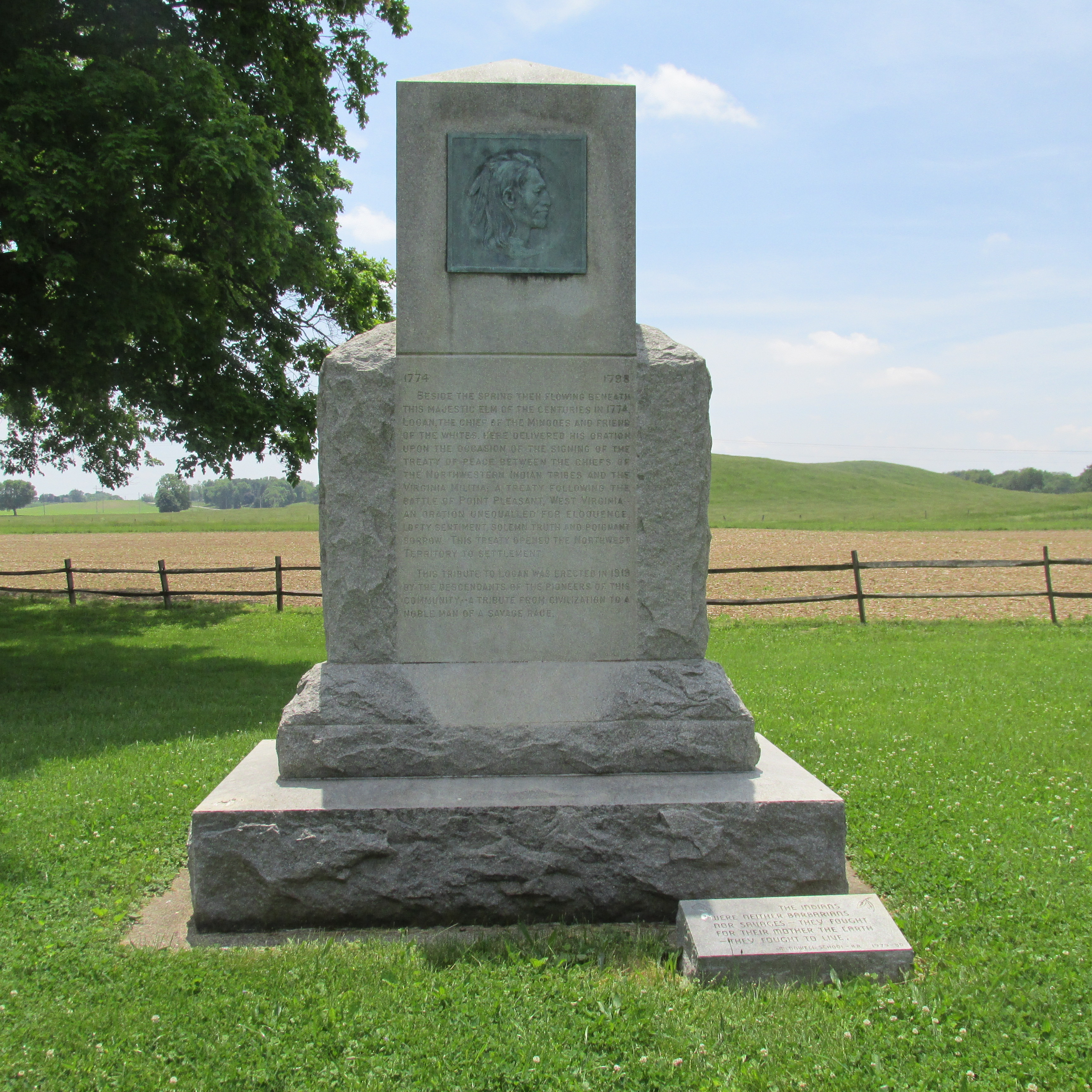
Logan monument

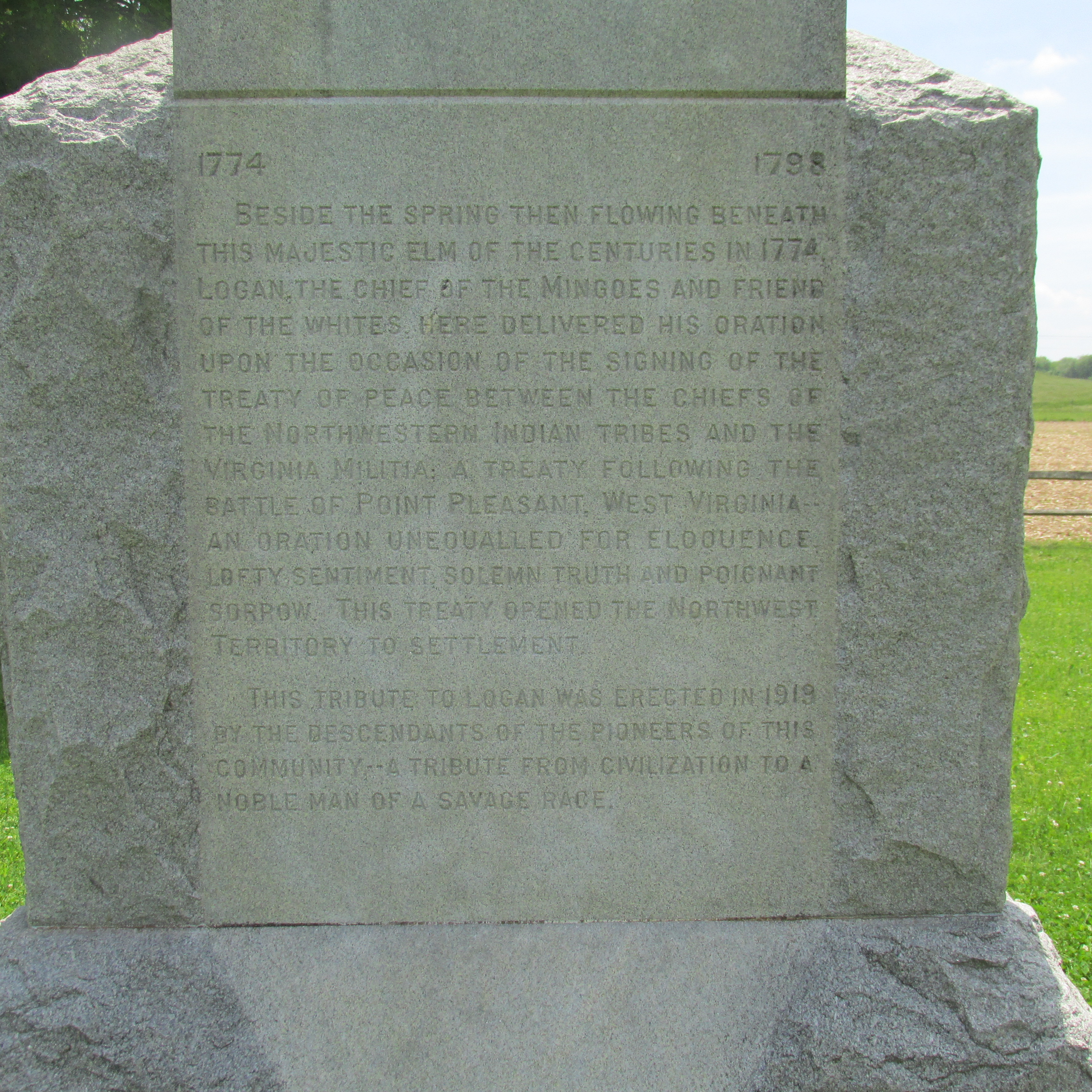
Logan monument

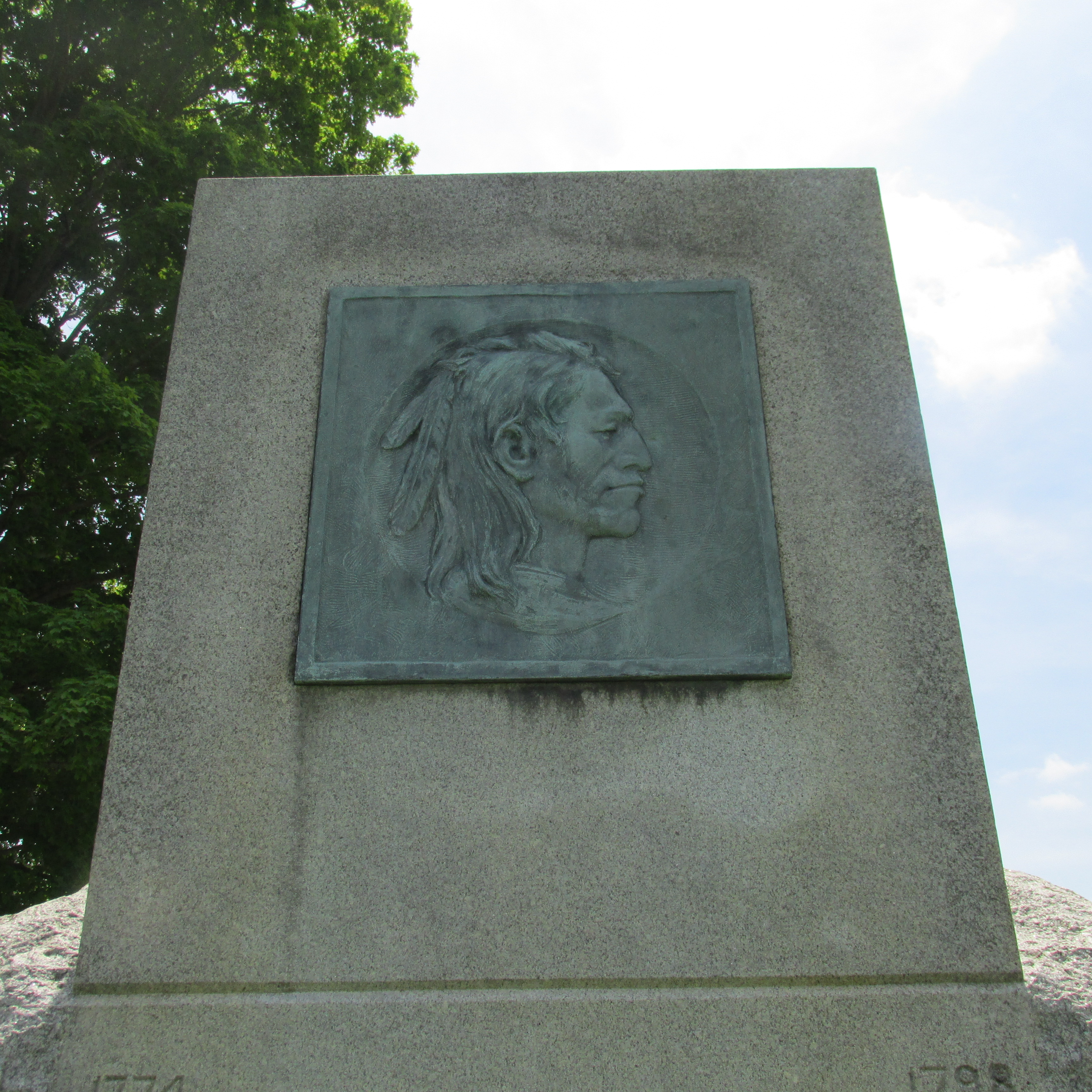
Logan monument

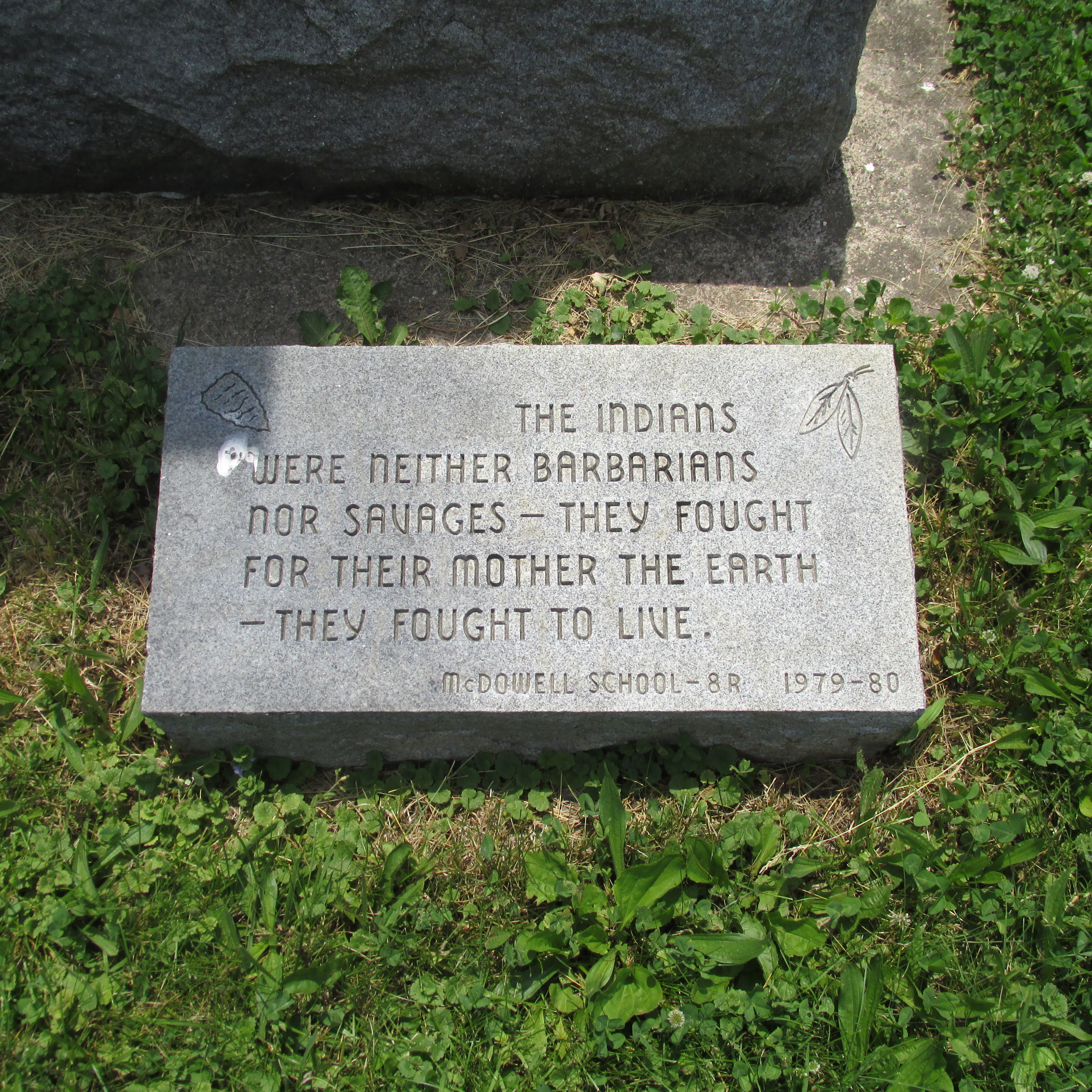
Logan monument

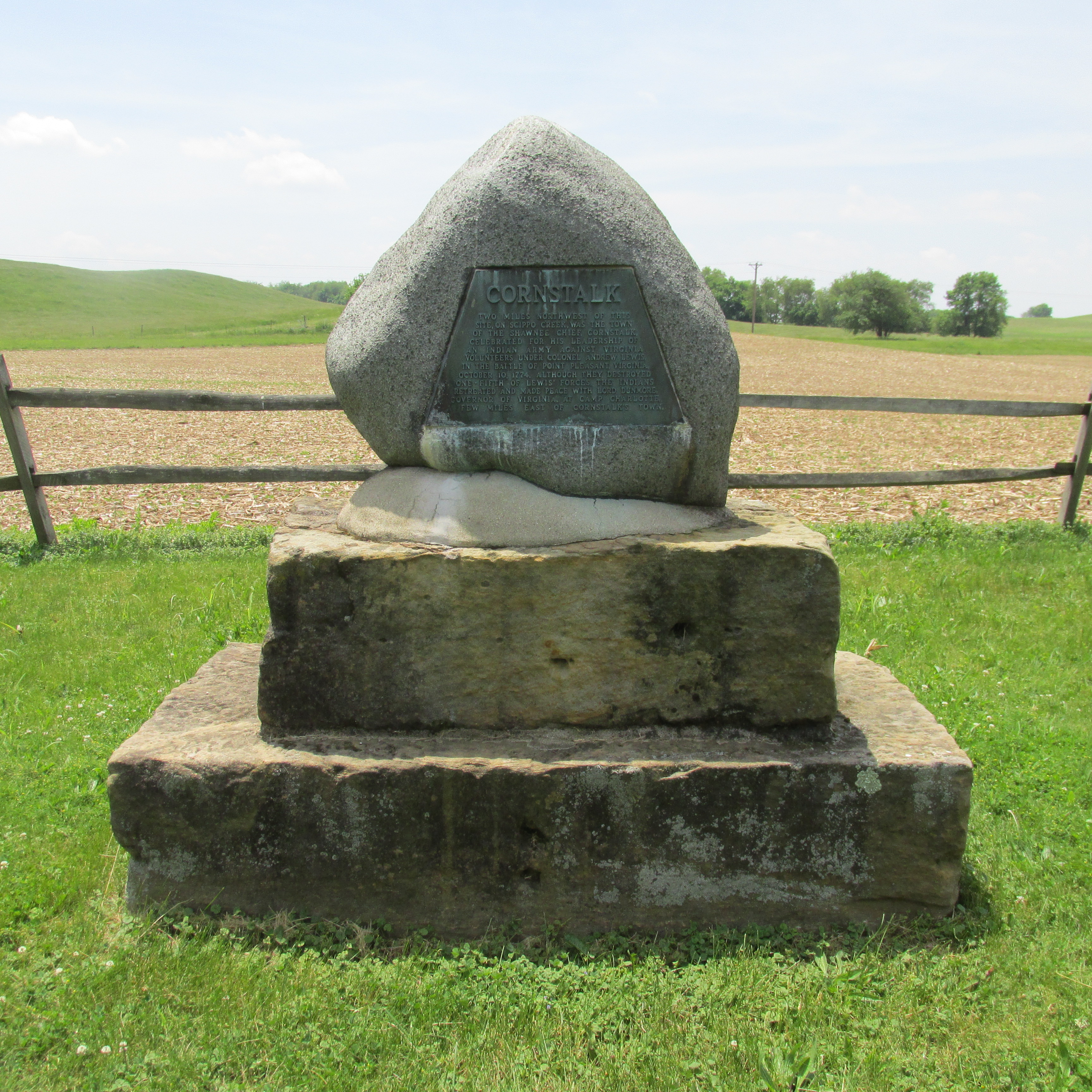
Cornstalk monument

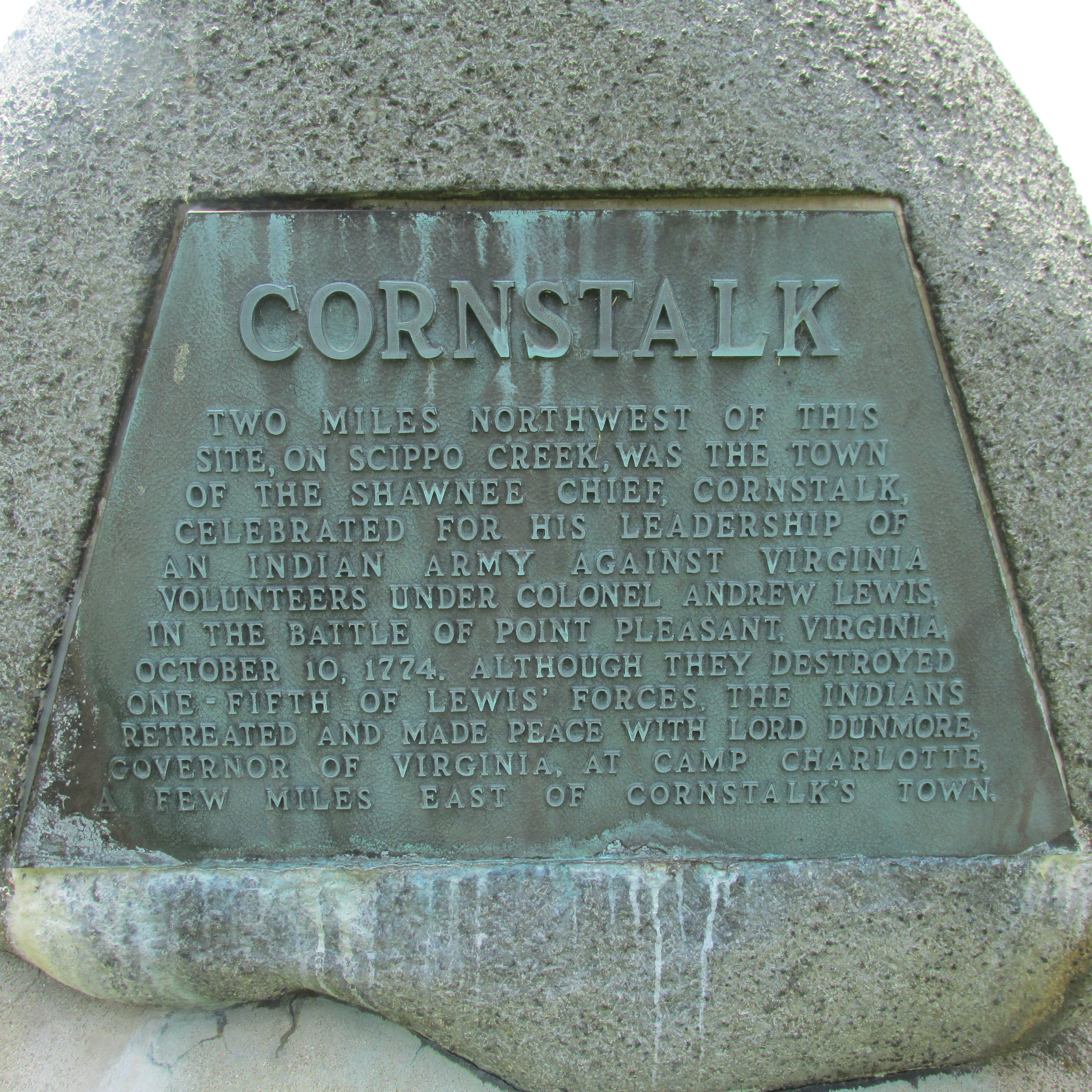
Cornstalk monument

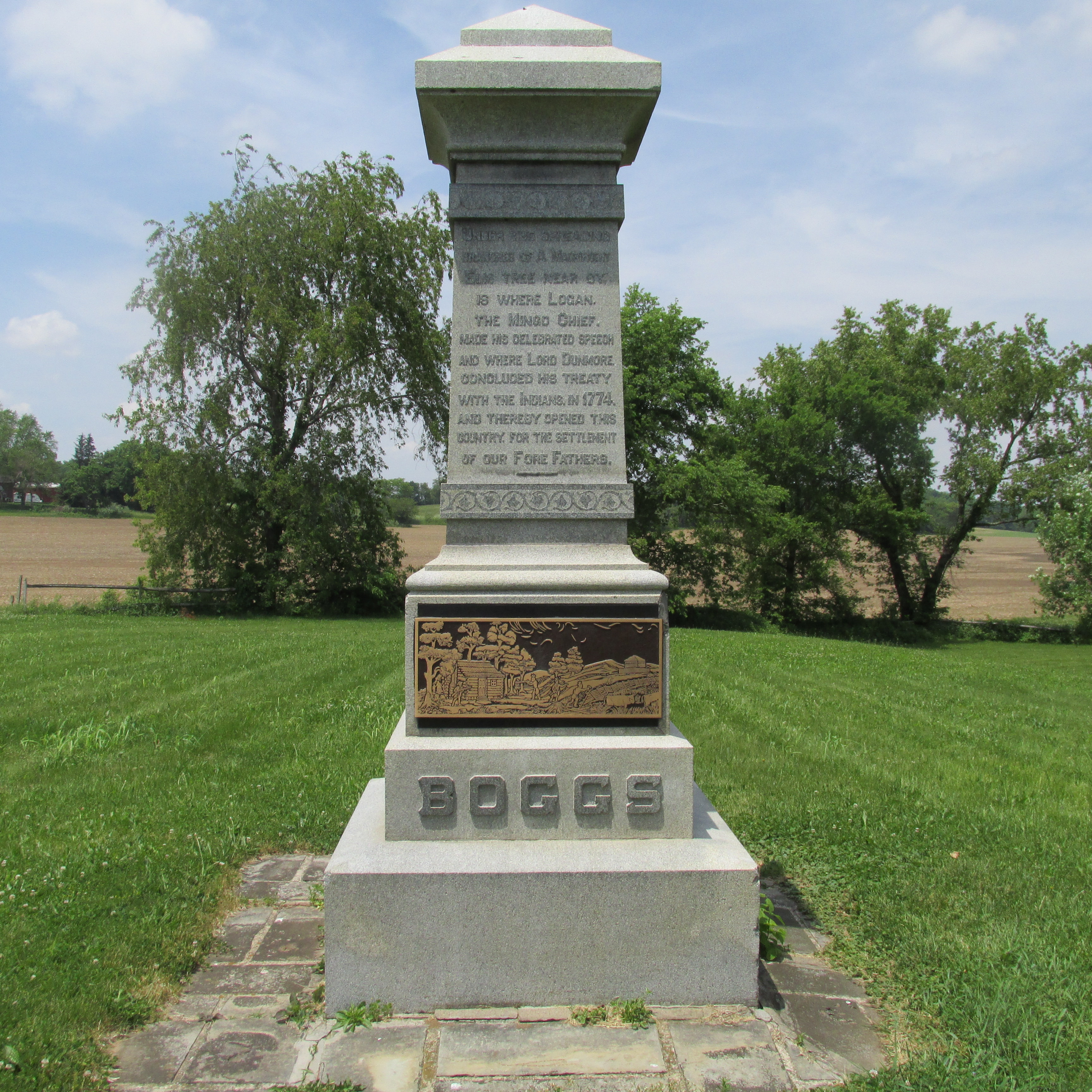
Boggs monument

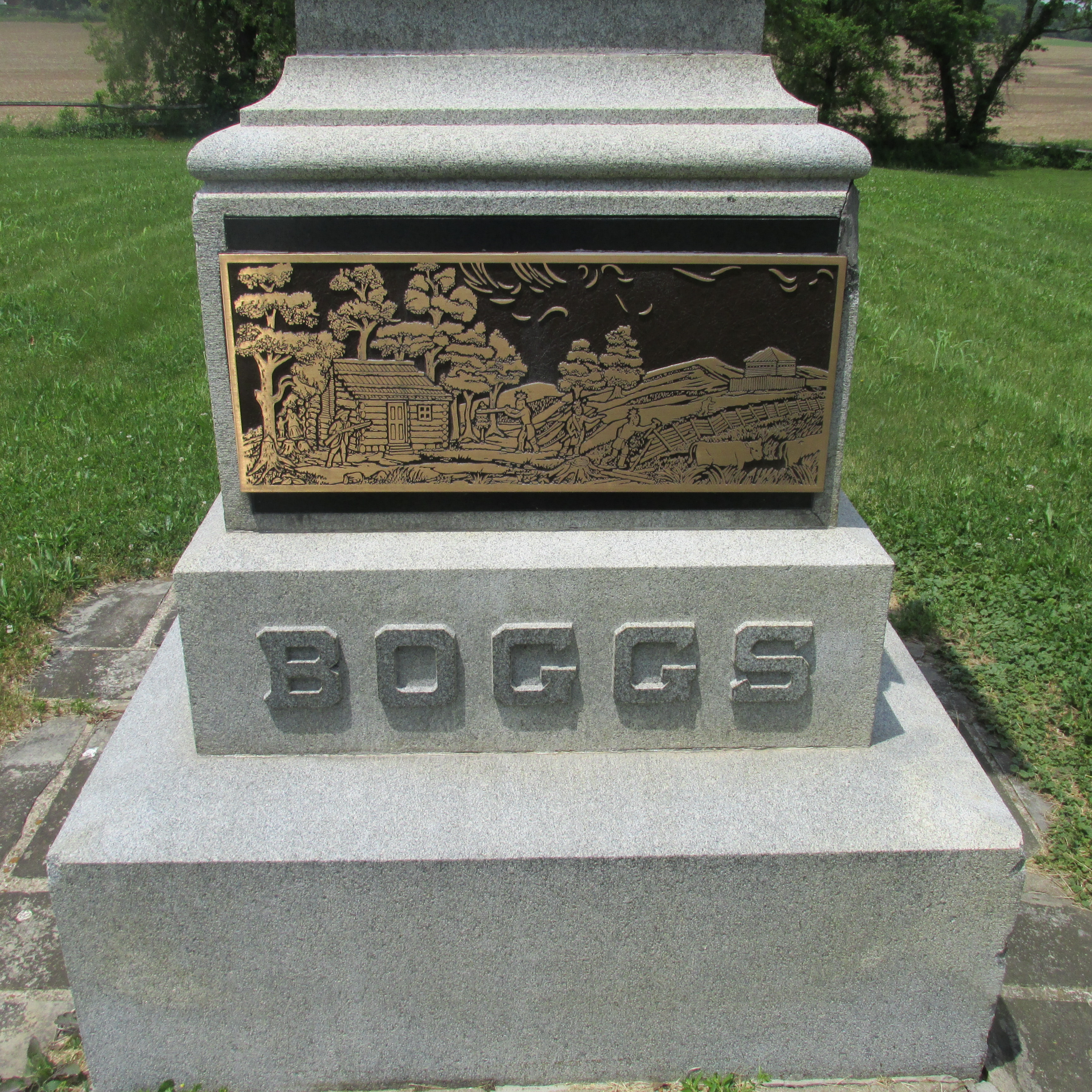
Boggs monument

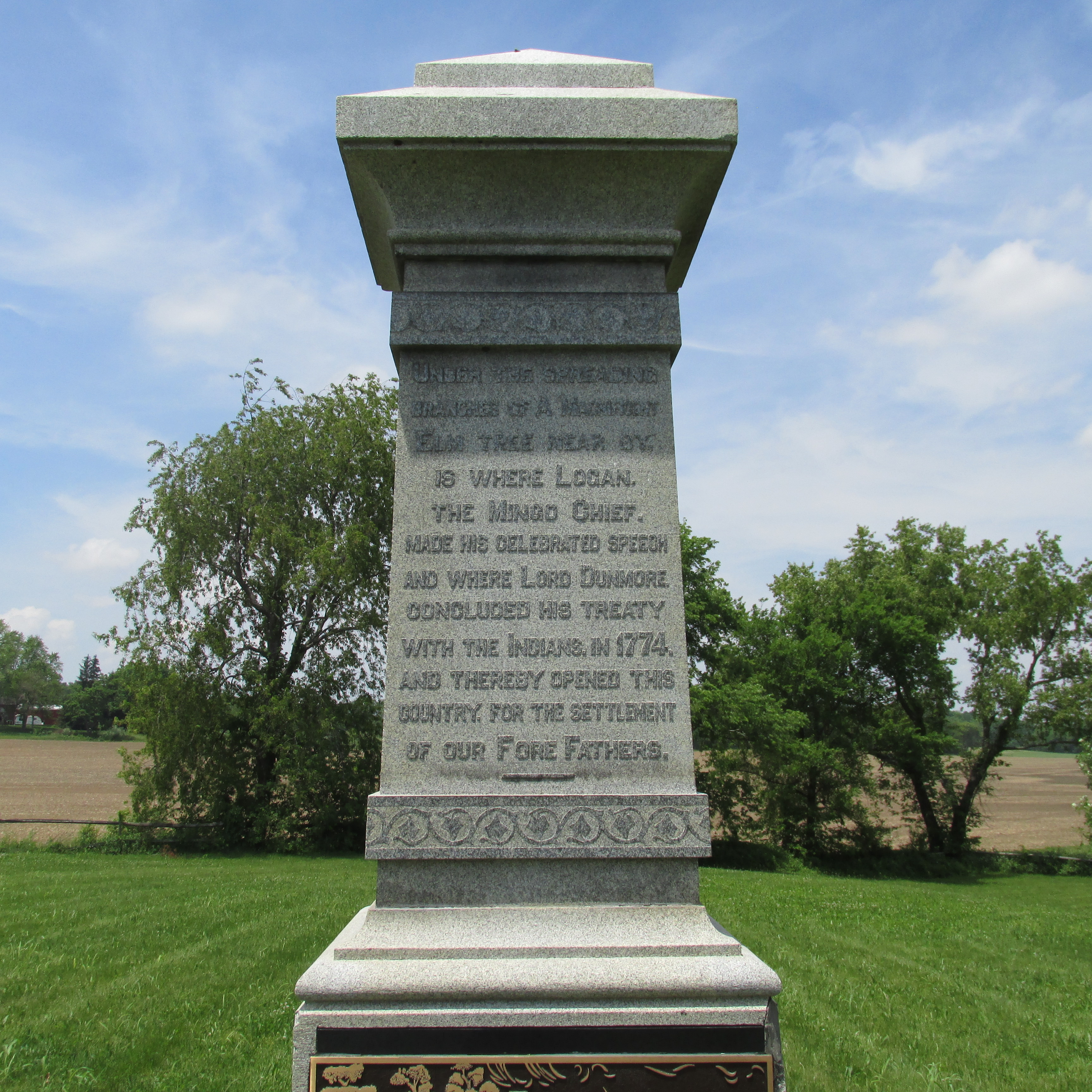
Boggs monument. Inscription reads "Under the spreading branches of a magnificent elm tree near by is where Logan the Mingo chief made his celebrated speech and where Lord Dunmore concluded his treaty with the Indians in 1774 and thereby opened this country for the settlement of our fore fathers."

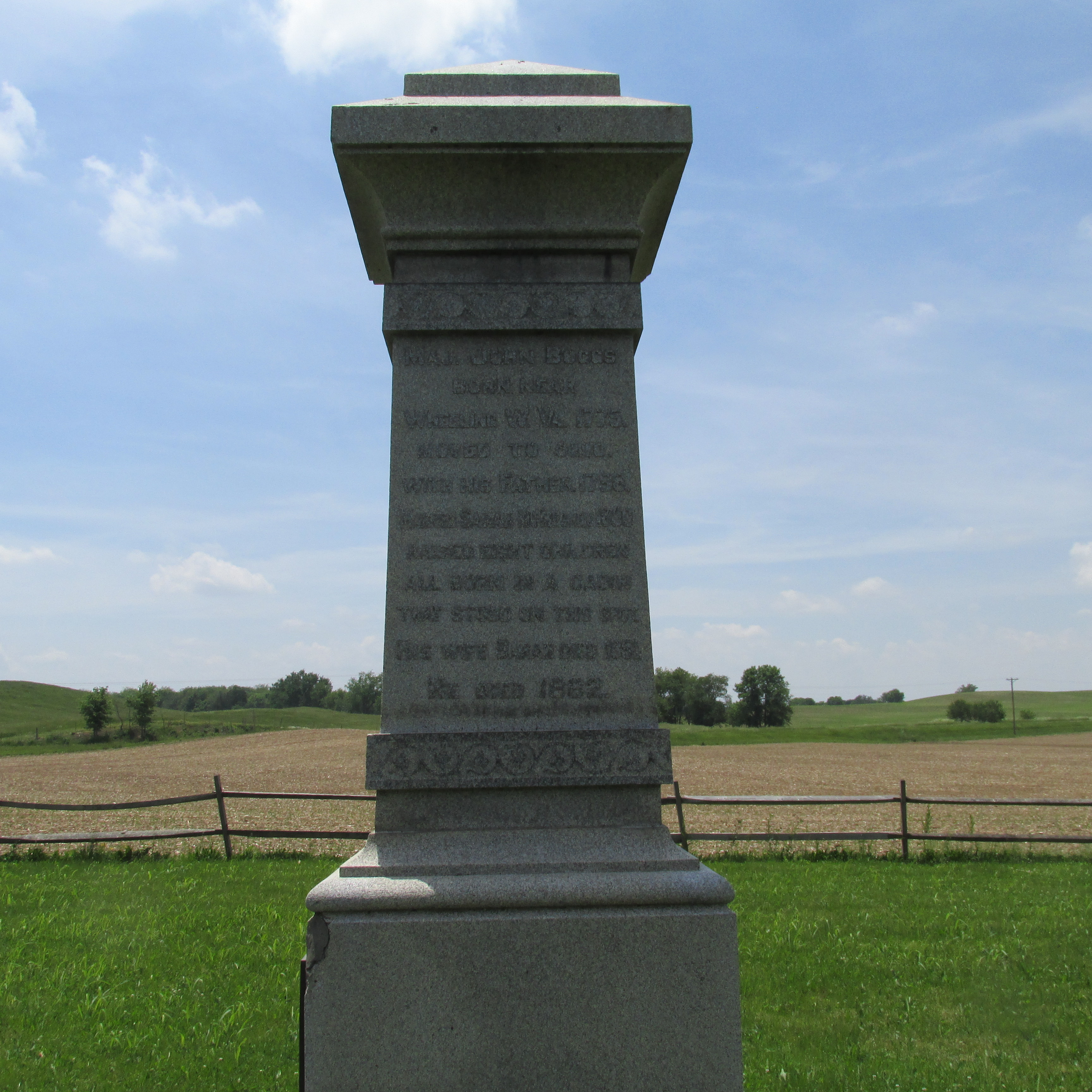
Boggs monument. Inscription reads "Maj. John Boggs born near Wheeling, W. Va 1775 moved to Ohio with his father 1798. Married Sarah McMecher 1800 raised eight children all born in a cabin that stood on this spot. His wife Sarah died 1851. He died 1862."

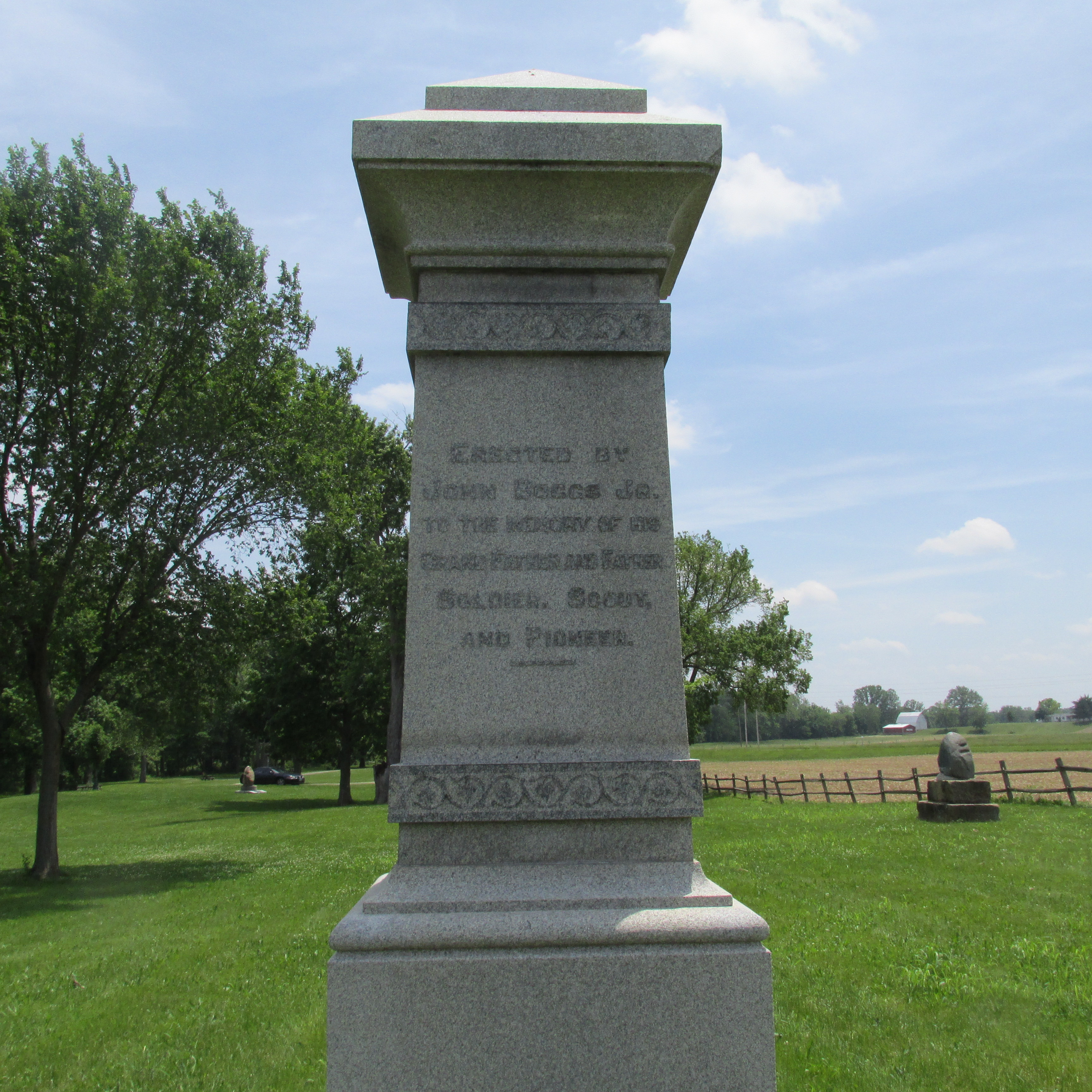
Boggs monument. Inscription reads "Erected by John Boggs Jr. to the memory of his grandfather and father. Soldier, scout, and pioneer."

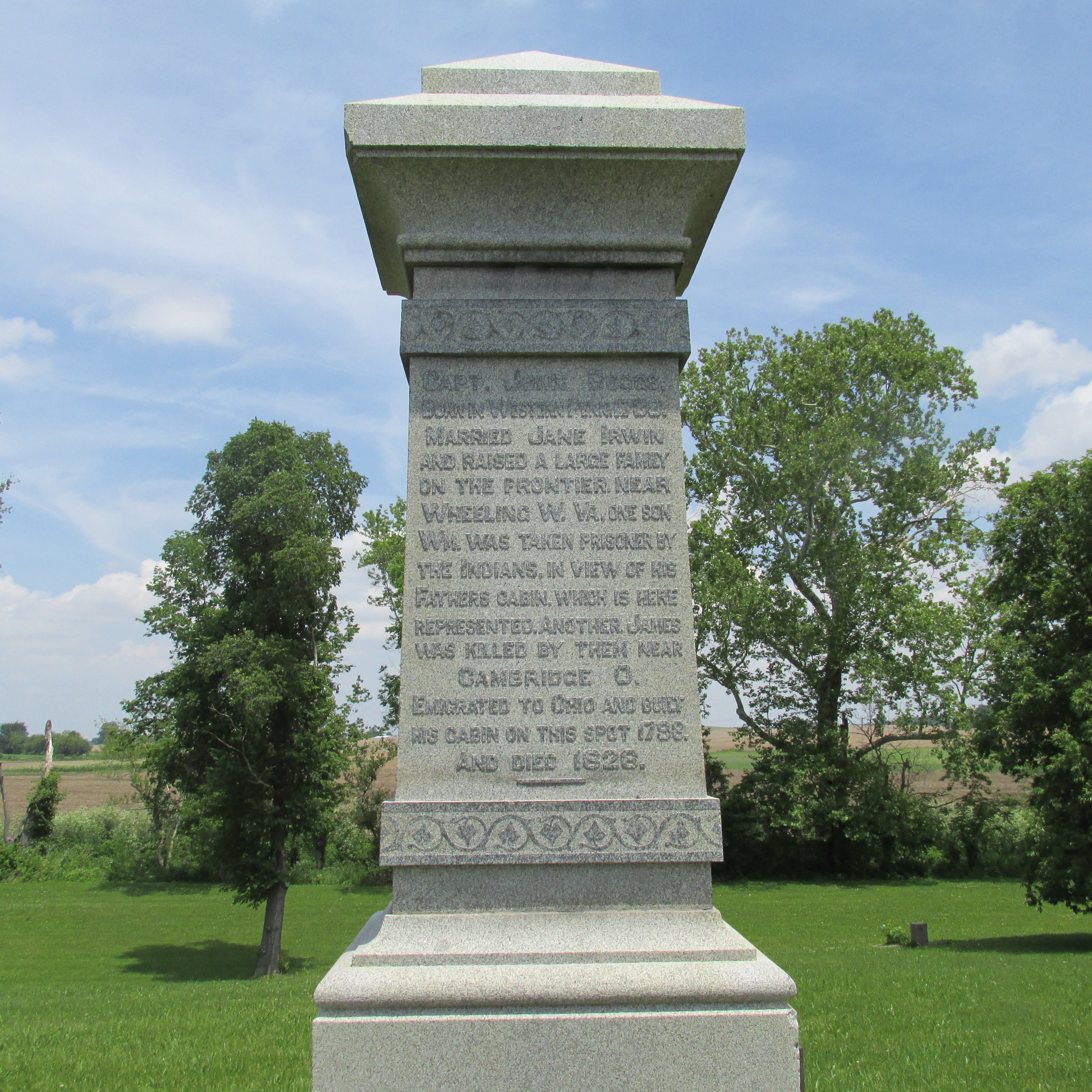
Boggs monument. Inscription reads "Capt. John Boggs born in western Penn. 1738. Married Jane Irwin and raised a large family on the frontier near Wheeling, W. Va. One son Wm. was taken prisoner by the Indians in view of his fathers cabin which is here represented. Another James was killed by them near Cambridge O. Emigrated to Ohio and built his cabin on this spot 1798 and died 1826."

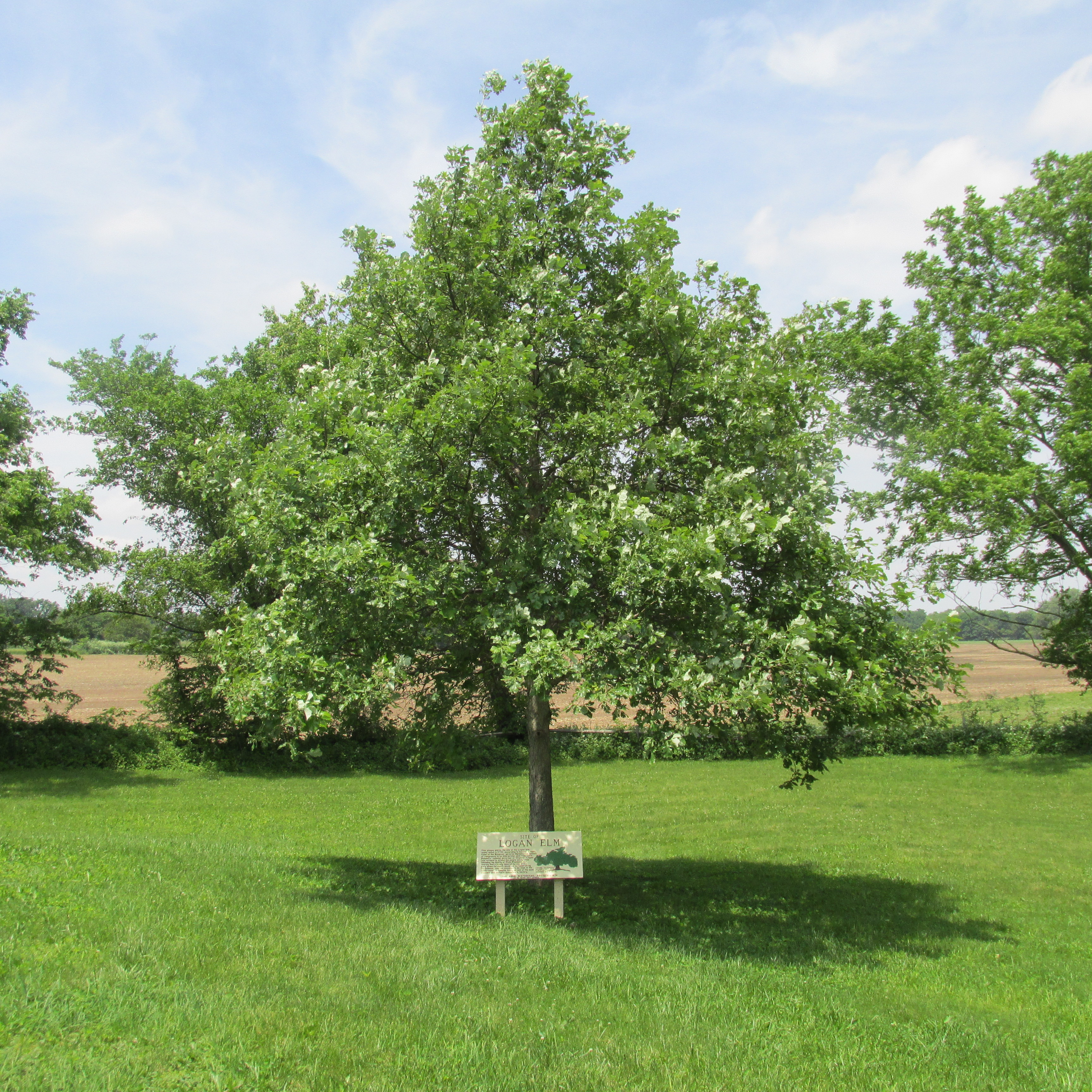
Site of Logan Elm

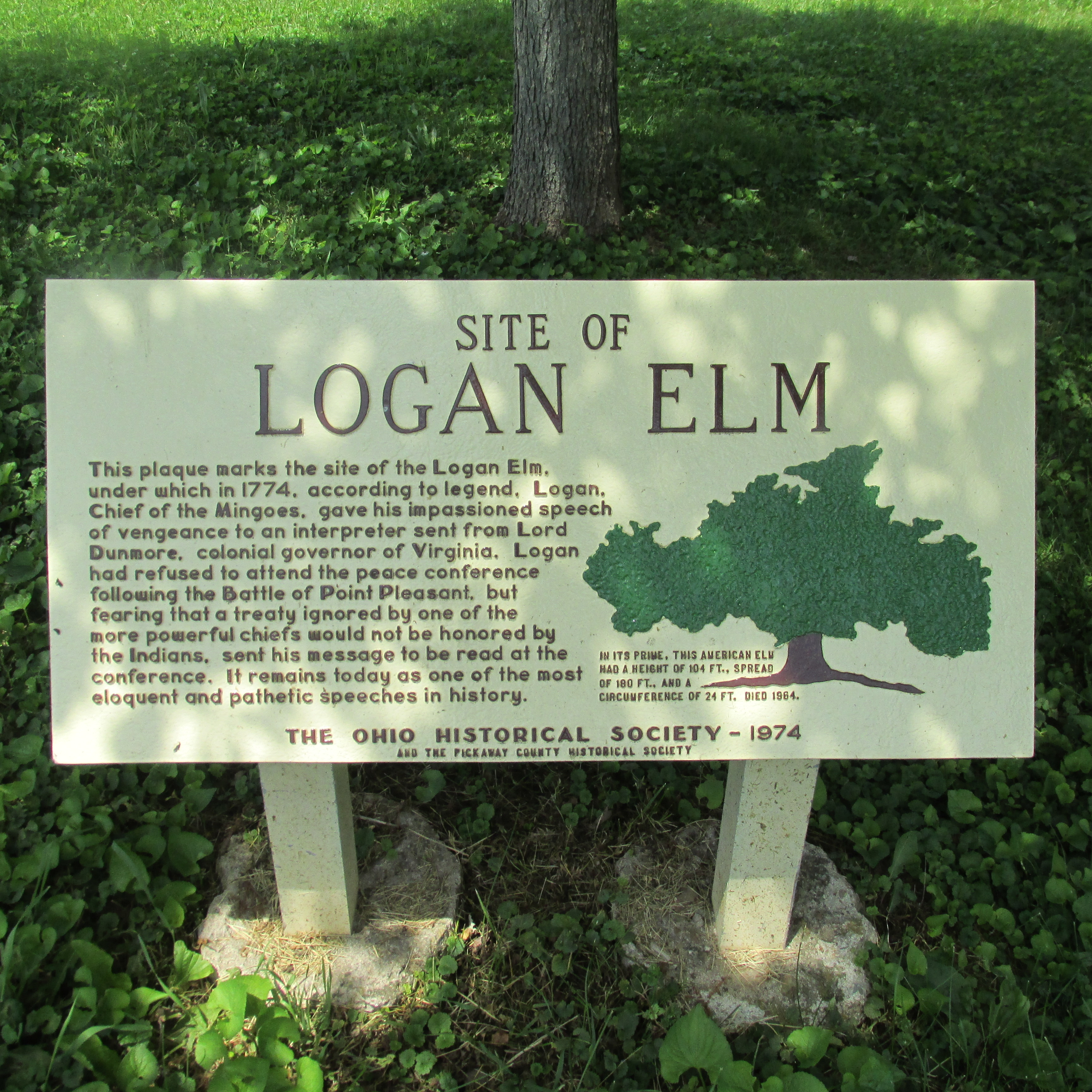
Site of Logan Elm

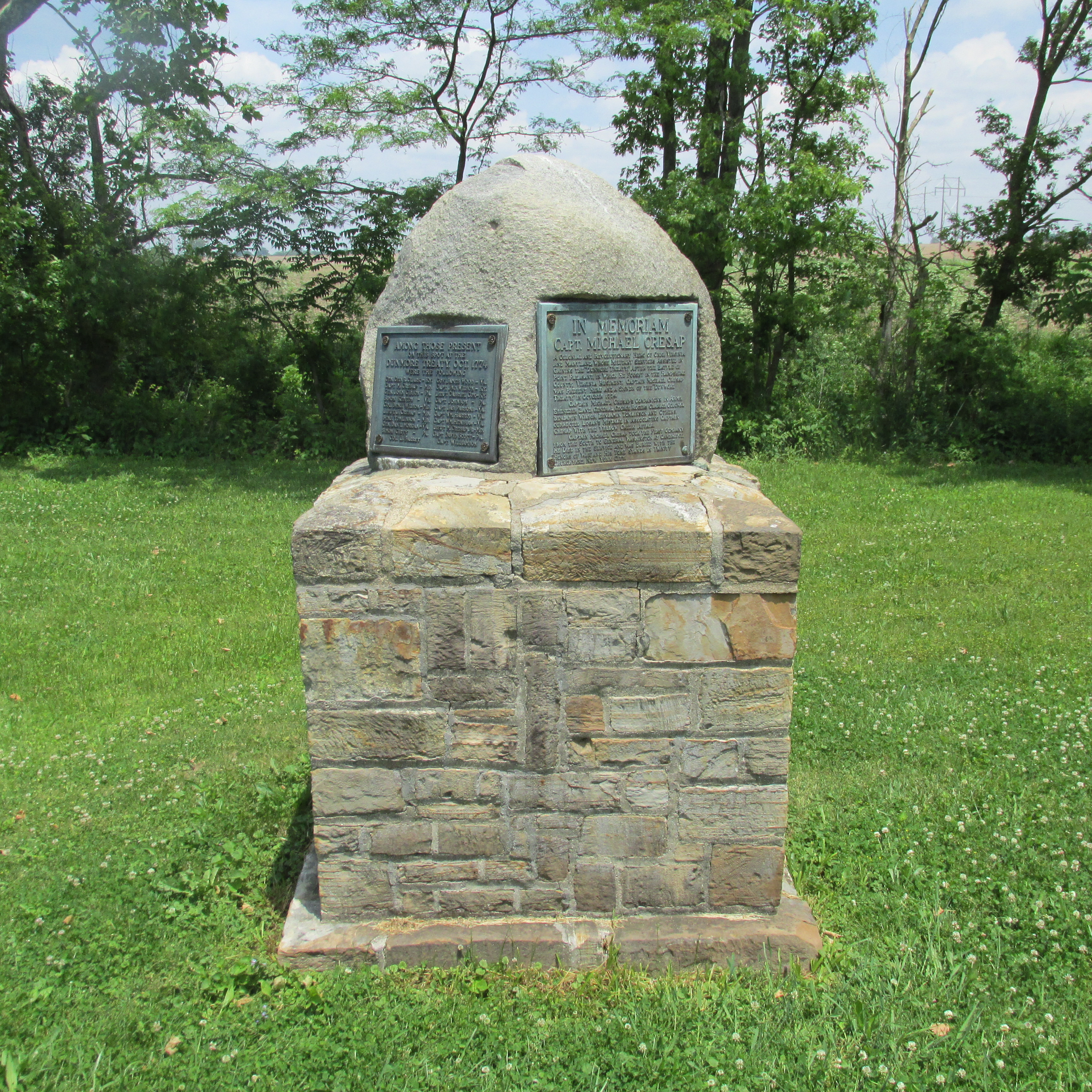
Michael Cresap monument

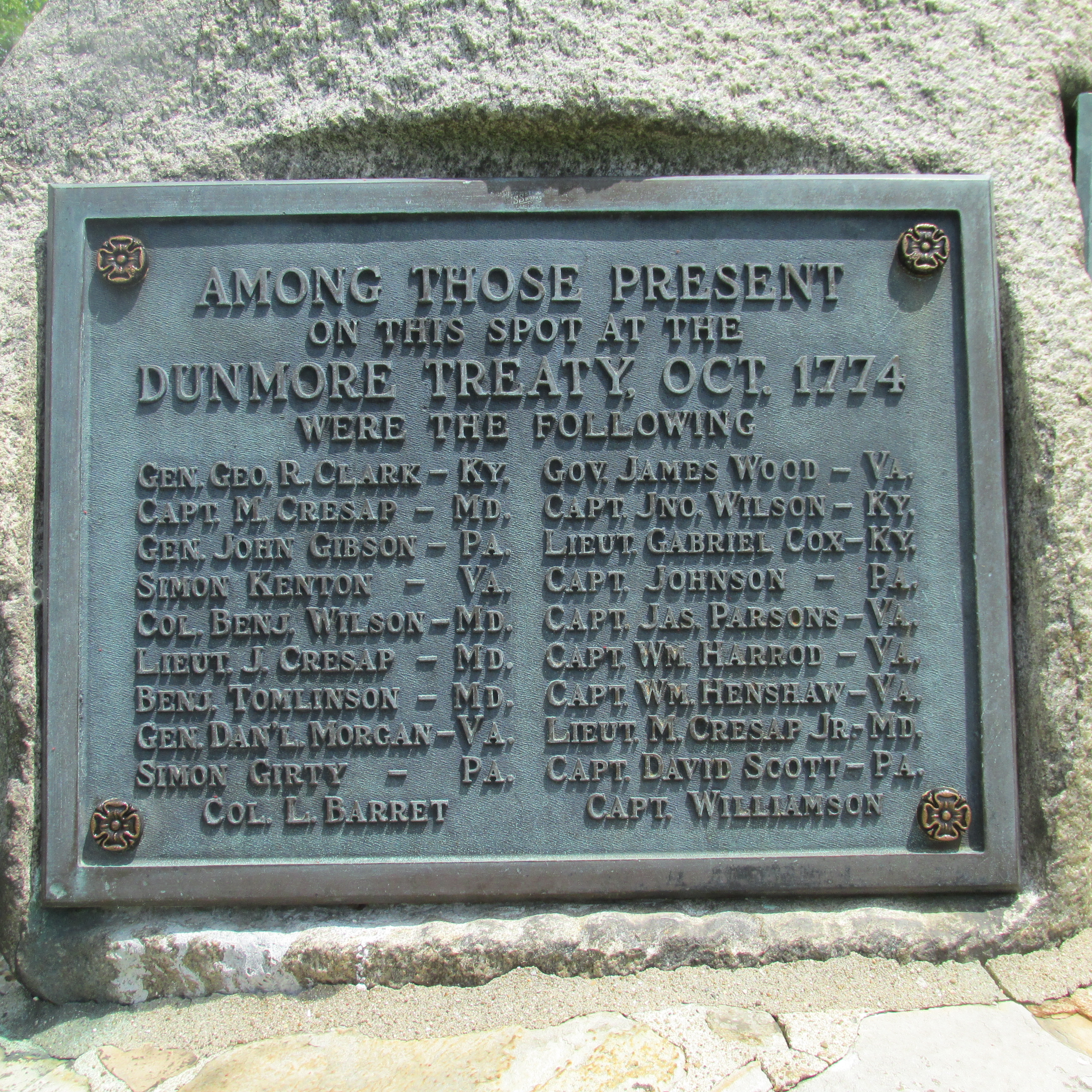
Michael Cresap monument

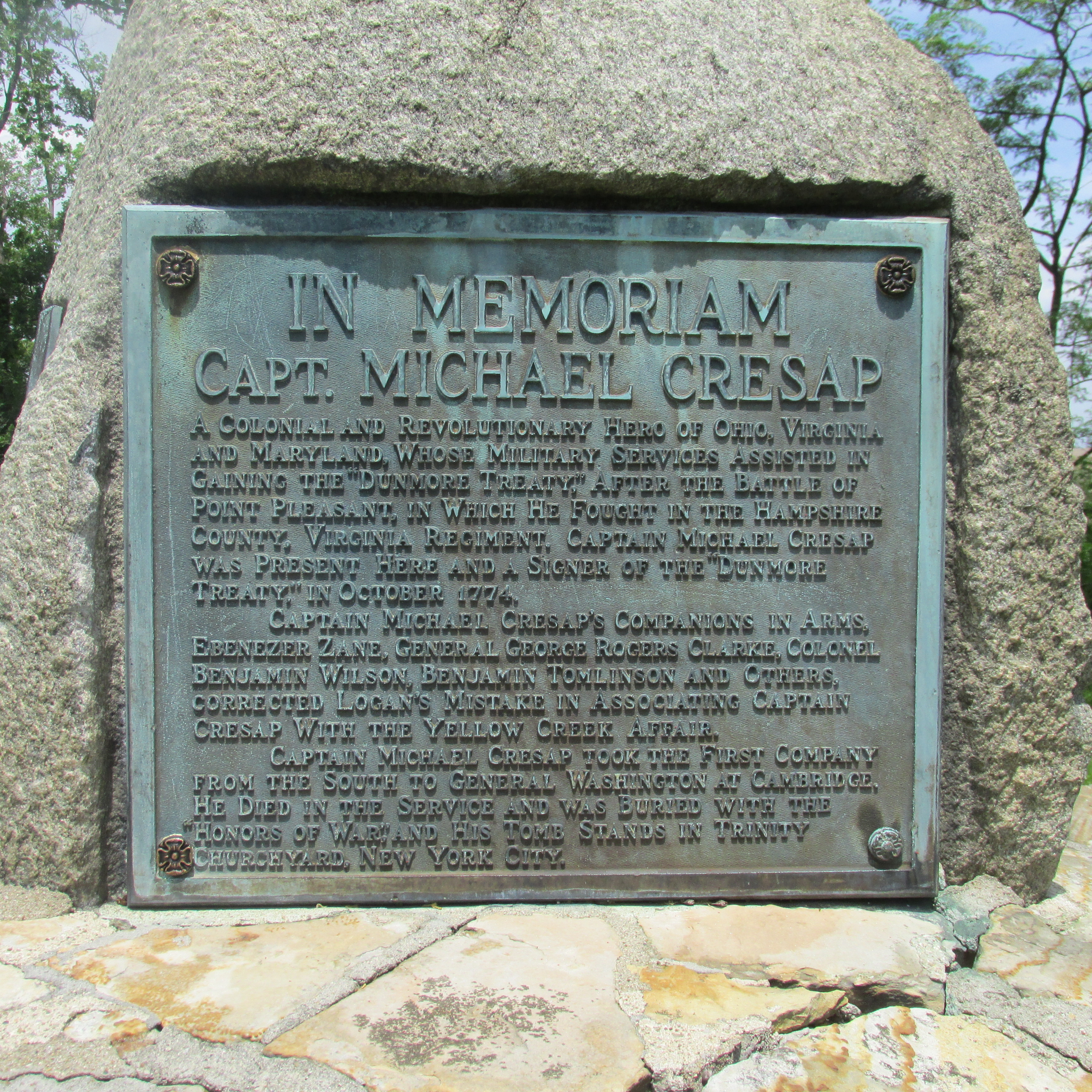
Michael Cresap monument

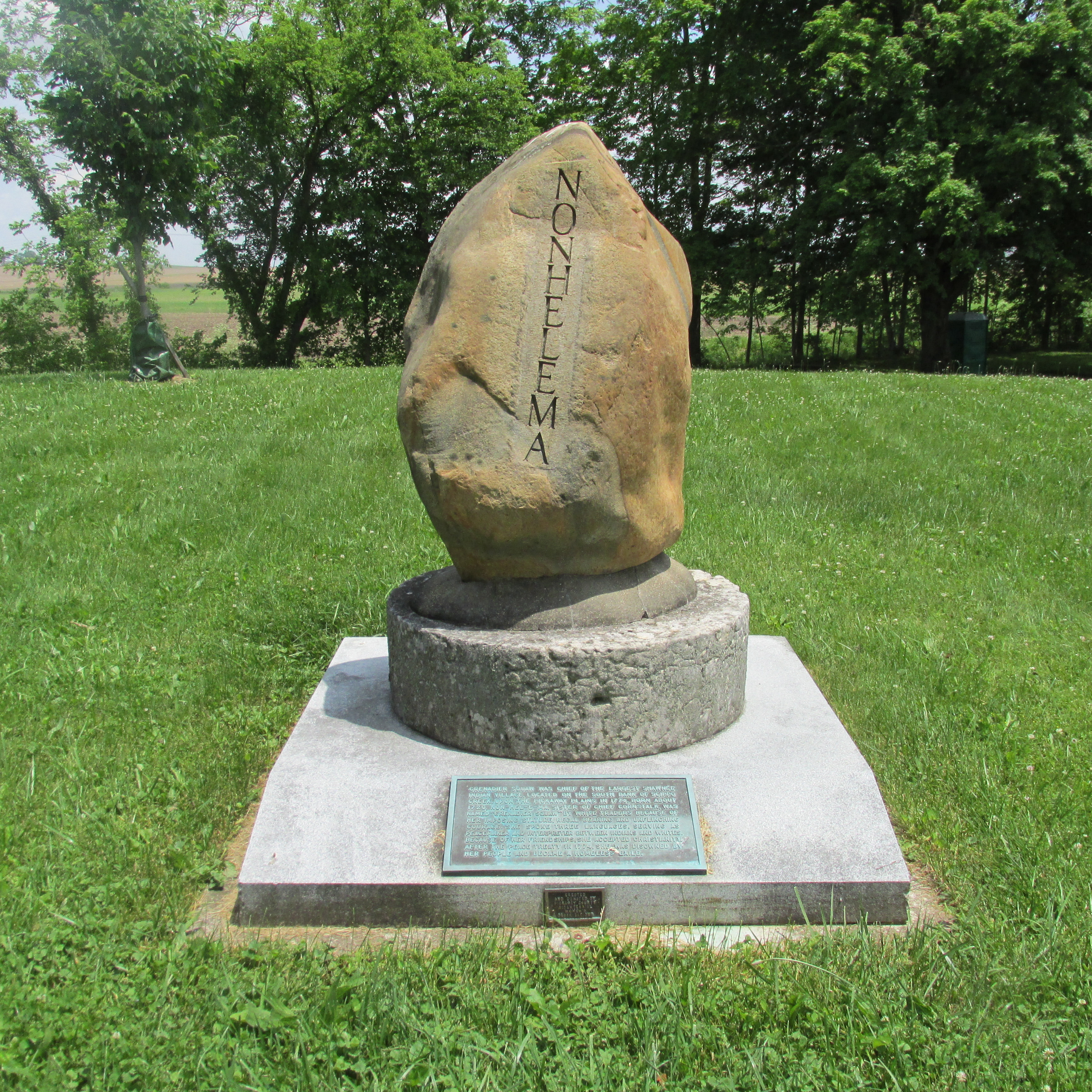
Nonhelema monument

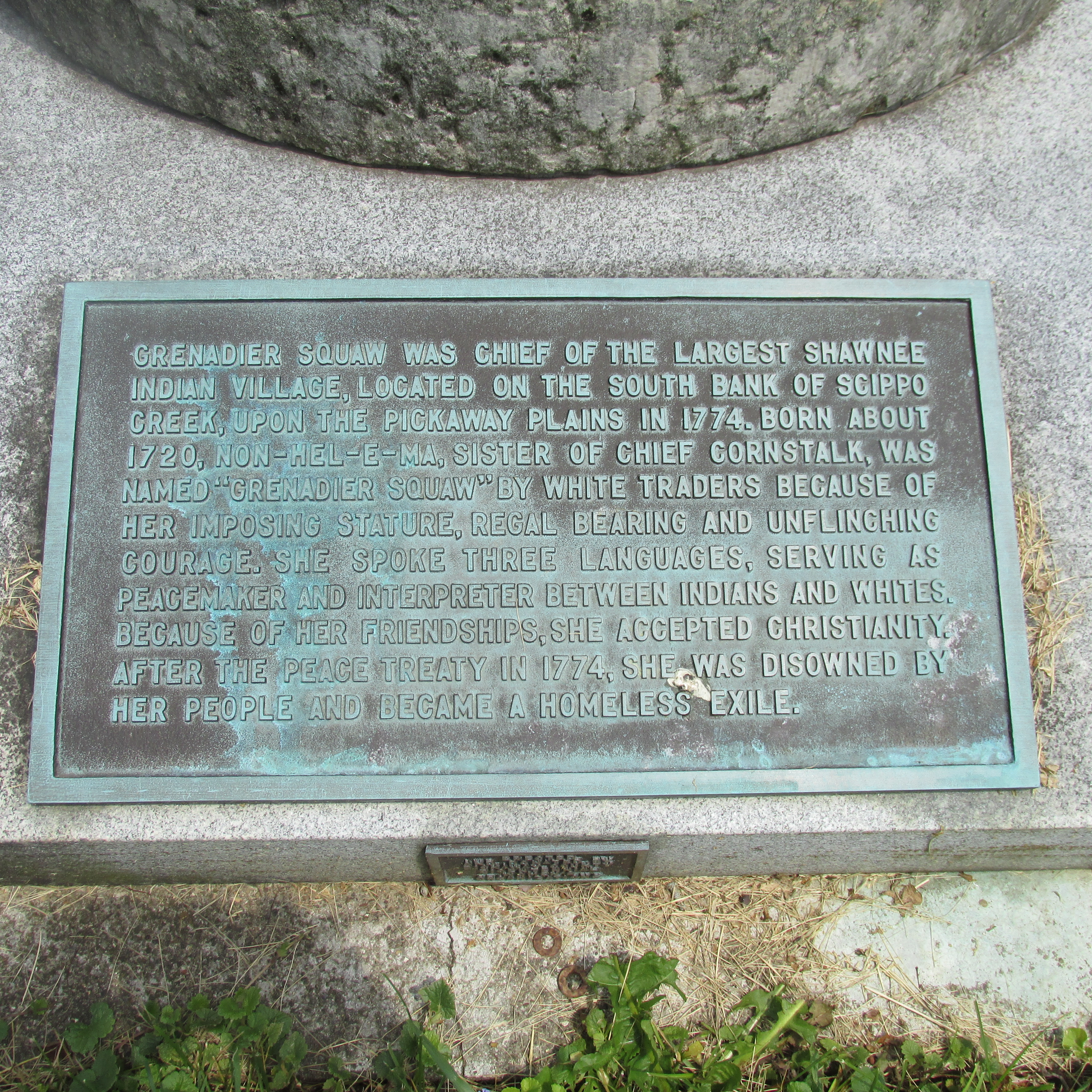
Nonhelema monument

== See also ==
- List of elm trees
- List of individual trees
