= List of Rensselaer Polytechnic Institute people =

This is a list of people associated with Rensselaer Polytechnic Institute, including presidents, institute leaders, trustees, alumni, professors and researchers.

For a list of the highest elected student leaders at RPI see: List of RPI Grand Marshals.

== Presidents of Rensselaer Polytechnic Institute ==
Name	Years	Previous position
Rev. Dr. Samuel Blatchford	(1824–1828)	Pastor of the Lansingburgh and Waterford Church
John Chester	(1828–1829)	Pastor of the Second Presbyterian Church in Albany
Eliphalet Nott	(1829–1845)	Pastor of First Presbyterian Church in Albany
Nathan S.S. Beman	(1845–1865)	Pastor of the First Presbyterian Church in Troy
John F. Winslow	(1865–1868)	Businessman and iron manufacturer
Thomas C. Brinsmade	1868	Troy physician
James Forsyth	(1868–1886)	Attorney and banker
William Gurley, 1839	(1886–1887) (acting)	Businessman, co-founder of Gurley Precision Instruments
Albert E. Powers	(1887–1888) (acting)	Banker
John H. Peck	(1888–1901)	Attorney and judge
Palmer C. Ricketts	(1901–1934)	Professor of rational and technical mechanics and academic director of RPI
William O. Hotchkiss	(1935–1943)	President of the Michigan Mining School
Livingston W. Houston, 1913	(1943–1958)	President and board chairman of the Ludlow Valve Manufacturing Co.; treasurer of RPI
Richard G. Folsom	(1958–1971)	Director of the Engineering Research Institute at the University of Michigan
Richard J. Grosh	(1971–1976)	Dean of the School of Engineering at Purdue University
George M. Low, 1948	(1976–1984)	Deputy administrator of NASA
Daniel Berg	(1984–1985) (acting) (1985–1987)	Vice president and provost of RPI
Stanley I. Landgraf, 1946	(1988–1988) (acting)	Chairman of Mohasco Corporation
Roland W. Schmitt	(1988–1993)	Senior vice president for science and technology for General Electric
R. Byron Pipes	(1993–1998)	Provost and professor of engineering at the University of Delaware
Cornelius J. Barton, 1958	(1998–1999) (acting)	CEO of Dorr-Oliver Incorporated, a chemical engineering firm
Shirley Ann Jackson	(1999–2022)	Chairman of the U.S. Nuclear Regulatory Commission
Martin A. Schmidt, 1981	(2022–present)	Provost of the Massachusetts Institute of Technology

== Notable alumni ==
=== Business ===
- John J. Albright (1868), businessman and philanthropist
- Marshall Brain (1983), founder of HowStuffWorks.com
- Dan Buckley (1991), president of Marvel Entertainment
- Gary Burrell, founder of Garmin
- George Lewis Capwell Cronin (1925), businessman and founder of the Ecuadorian baseball & soccer team Club Sport Emelec
- Nicholas M. Donofrio (1967), director of research at IBM, trustee
- Joseph Gerber (1947), founder of Gerber Scientific
- William Gurley (1839), and Lewis E. Gurley, brothers and founders of Gurley Precision Instruments
- J. Erik Jonsson (1922), co-founder and former president of Texas Instruments Incorporated, and mayor of Dallas
- William Meaney (1982), president & CEO of Iron Mountain
- William Mow (1959), founded apparel maker Bugle Boy in 1977
- Sean O’Sullivan (1985), along with three other RPI students (Laszlo Bardos, Andrew Dressel, and John Haller), founded MapInfo on the RPI campus
- Nicholas T. Pinchuk (1968), chairman & CEO of Snap-on
- Curtis Priem (1982), NVIDIA co-founder; architect of the first PC video processor and many that followed; trustee
- John Rigas, co-founder of Adelphia Communications
- Sheldon Roberts (1948), member of the "traitorous eight" who created Silicon Valley; co-founder of Fairchild Semiconductor and Amelco
- Bert Sutherland, manager of Sun Microsystems laboratories
- William H. Wiley (1866), Civil War artillery commander, co-founder of publisher John Wiley and Sons, and US State Representative
- Edward Zander (1968), former CEO of Motorola

=== Humanities, arts, and social sciences ===
- Zachary Barth, video game designer (founder of Zachtronics), creator of Infiniminer
- Felix Bernard, composer of the Christmas song "Winter Wonderland"
- Julie Berry, children's author
- Charles Amos Cummings, architect and historian
- Warren Davis (1977), video game designer/programmer (co-creator of Q*bert)
- David Duquette, philosophy professor
- Ben Esposito, video game designer and director
- Bobby Farrelly, film director, writer and producer, Dumb and Dumber, Shallow Hal, There's Something About Mary
- Fitzedward Hall (1901), Orientalist
- David Hayter, Canadian voice actor
- Ned Herrmann, creator of the Herrmann Brain Dominance Instrument
- Lily Hevesh, YouTuber and domino artist (attended RPI for less than a year before dropping out to pursue domino art full time)
- Tyler Hinman (2006), multiple winner of the American Crossword Puzzle Tournament
- Erin Hoffman, game designer and author
- Joe Howard, Jr. (1857), reporter and war correspondent
- Jennifer & Kevin McCoy (1994), artists who both graduated from RPI
- Meera Nanda, writer, philosopher of science, and faculty, Jawaharlal Nehru University, New Delhi
- Mary Pride (1974), Christian author
- Samuel Wells Williams, 19th-century linguist

=== Invention and engineering ===
- Truman H. Aldrich (1869), civil engineer, also briefly a US State Representative
- B. Jayant Baliga (1971, 1974), inventor of the insulated gate bipolar transistor (IGBT)
- Garnet Baltimore (1881), first African-American engineer and Garnet D. Baltimore Lecture Series honoree
- Virgil Bogue (1868), chief engineer of Union Pacific Railroad and Western Maryland Railway constructions
- Peter Bohlin 1958, architect of the famous 5th Avenue Apple Store
- Bimal Kumar Bose (1932), electrical engineer
- Leffert L. Buck (1968), civil engineer and a pioneer in the use of steel arch bridge structures, including the Williamsburg Bridge in NYC
- Alexander Cassatt (1859), civil engineer and railroad executive
- George Hammell Cook (1839), state geologist of New Jersey
- Dr. Allen B. Dumont (1924), perfected the cathode-ray tube; the "father of modern TV"
- Theodore N. Ely (1896), railroad executive
- George Washington Gale Ferris Jr. (1881), inventor of the Ferris wheel
- Lois Graham (1946), first woman to receive an engineering degree from RPI, and the first woman in the U.S. to receive a PhD in mechanical engineering
- Frederick Grinnell (1855), inventor of the modern fire sprinkler
- Walter Lincoln Hawkins (1931), African-American inventor of plastic telephone wire
- Beatrice Hicks (1965), co-founder of Society of Women Engineers
- Henry Wilson Hodge (1885), director of railroads for the American Expeditionary Force during World War I
- Marcian Hoff (1958), "father of the microprocessor"
- Dorothy Hoffman (1949), first woman to serve as president of any scientific society in the US, elected president of American Vacuum Society in 1974
- Frank Hursey (1977), inventor of QuikClot
- J. Christopher Jaffe (1949), leader in architectural acoustic design; taught acoustics at the Juilliard School, City University of New York, and Rensselaer
- Theodore Judah (1837), visionary of the transcontinental railroad
- Robert Loewy (1947), aeronautical engineer
- William Metcalf (1858), steel manufacturing pioneer
- Keith D. Millis (1938), metallurgical engineer and inventor of ductile iron
- David L. Noble (1940), inventor of the floppy disk
- Ralph Peck (1937), geotechnical engineer
- Emil H. Praeger (1915), designer of Shea and Dodger Stadiums, Tappan Zee Bridge, Arecibo Telescope and a renovation of the White House
- George Brooke Roberts (1849), civil engineer, 5th president of the Pennsylvania Railroad
- Washington Roebling (1857), chief engineer of the Brooklyn Bridge
- Mortimer Rogoff (1943), first to patent an electronic navigational chart and set up industry standards
- James Salisbury (1844), physician and inventor of the Salisbury Steak
- Steven Sasson (1973), engineer and inventor of the digital camera
- Robert "RJ" Scaringe (2005), CEO & founder of Rivian
- John F. Schenck (1961), physician and co-inventor of the first clinically viable high-field MRI scanner at General Electric
- Massood Tabib-Azar, chemical engineer
- Raymond Tomlinson (1963), inventor of the email system
- Alan M. Voorhees (1947), city planner and traffic forecaster; former Rensselaer trustee; principal supporter for the Voorhees Computing Center at Rensselaer
- John Alexander Low Waddell (1871), civil engineer and prolific bridge builder
- Robert H. Widmer (1938), aeronautical engineer and designer of the B-58 supersonic bomber

=== Military ===
- Harold J. Greene (1980), major general, U.S. Army, highest ranking casualty of the War in Afghanistan
- William L. Haskin (1861), U.S. Army brigadier general
- Arthur L. McCullough, U.S. Air Force general
- Ario Pardee Jr. (1858), Union Army veteran who attained the rank of brigadier general by brevet
- L. Scott Rice (1980), major general, U.S. Air Force; commander of Massachusetts Air National Guard
- Thomas R. Sargent III, vice admiral, U.S. Coast Guard; vice commandant 1970–1974
- Walter L. Sharp, general, U.S. Army; commander of United Nations Command, commander of ROK-US Combined Forces Command and commander of U.S. Forces Korea (2008–2011); former director of the Joint Staff (2005–2008)
- Franklin Guest Smith, Union Army veteran who attained the rank of brigadier general
- Blake Wayne Van Leer (1953), commander and captain in the U.S. Navy; led SeaBee program and led the nuclear research and power unit at McMurdo Station during Operation Deep Freeze
- Peter D. Vroom (1862), inspector general of the U.S. Army
- Arthur E. Williams, lieutenant general, U.S. Army Corps of Engineers; Chief of Engineers in 1992
- Ronald J. Zlatoper (1963), chief of Naval Personnel; battle group commander in Desert Storm and Desert Shield; former military assistant to the secretary of defense; trustee

=== Politics and public service ===
- J. Frank Aldrich (1877), U.S. representative from Illinois
- Truman H. Aldrich (1869), U.S. representative from Alabama (1896–1897)
- William Beidelman, Union Army second lieutenant, second mayor of Easton, Pennsylvania
- Myles Brand (1964), president of the National Collegiate Athletic Association
- George R. Dennis, United states senator from Maryland
- Francis Collier Draper (1854), Toronto lawyer, Toronto Police chief
- Thomas Farrell (1912), deputy commanding general of the Manhattan Project
- Nariman Farvardin (1983), provost of the University of Maryland
- Lincoln D. Faurer (1964), director of the National Security Agency and chief, Central Security Service, 1981–1985
- Richard Franchot, U.S. representative from New York (1861–1863)
- Arthur J. Gajarsa (1962), judge of the United States Court of Appeals for the Federal Circuit, trustee
- Naeem Gheriany, minister of Higher Education and Scientific Research, Libya
- Thomas J. Haas (1983), current president of Grand Valley State University
- John Hammond, US representative from New York, iron manufacturer
- Walter F. Lineberger, U.S. state representative of California, 1917–1921
- Richard Linn (1965), judge of the United States Court of Appeals for the Federal Circuit
- George Low, manager of NASA's Apollo 11 project; president of RPI (1976–1984); namesake of RPI's Low Center for Industrial Innovation
- Hani Al-Mulki (MA, PhD), former prime minister of Jordan
- John Olver (1958), Massachusetts state representative (D) since 1991
- Ely S. Parker, Civil War statesman, author of Appomattox Courthouse agreement
- Clarkson Nott Potter (1843), U.S. representative from New York, surveyor, lawyer, and president of the American Bar Association
- Mark Shepard (1994), Vermont state senator
- Clement Hall Sinnickson, U.S. state representative from New Jersey, 1875–1879
- Peter G. Ten Eyck, New York state representative
- Mike ter Maat, 2024 Libertarian Party vice presidential nominee
- Tony Tether (1964), director of DARPA, 2001–2009
- W. Aubrey Thomas, U.S. state representative from Ohio, 1900–1911
- De Volson Wood (1857), first president of the American Society for Engineering Education

=== Science and technology ===
- David Adler (1956), physicist
- Don L. Anderson (1955), geophysicist
- James Curtis Booth (1832), chemist
- James Cantor (1988), neuroscientist, sex researcher
- Ronald Collé (1972), nuclear physicist at NIST
- George Hammell Cook (1839), state geologist of New Jersey
- Edgar Cortright (1949), former NASA official
- Ebenezer Emmons (1826), geologist, author of Natural History of New York (1848) and American Geology
- David Ferrucci (1994), computer scientist, developed IBM Watson AI Jeopardy player
- Asa Fitch (1827), entomologist
- Alan Fowler (1951), physicist, NAS member
- Claire M. Fraser (1977), president and director of The Institute for Genomic Research
- Jeffrey M. Friedman, discovered leptin, a key hormone in the area of human obesity
- Ivar Giaever (1964), shared the 1973 Nobel Prize in Physics for discoveries on tunneling phenomena in semiconductors; Institute Professor of Science
- Morton Gurtin (1955), mathematical physicist
- James Hall (1832), geologist and paleontologist
- Jon Hall (1977), executive director of Linux International
- Peter E. Hart, group senior vice president of the Ricoh company; artificial intelligence innovator
- Edward C. Harwood, economist
- Hermann A. Haus (1951), optical communications researcher, pioneer of quantum optics
- Eben Norton Horsford (1838), "father of food science" and author, discovered baking powder
- Douglass Houghton (1829), Michigan's first state geologist; namesake of a Michigan city, county, and lake
- Robert Kennicutt (1973), astronomer
- Richard Klein (1966), astronomer
- David Korn (1965), computer programmer who created the Korn Shell
- Richard Mastracchio (1987), NASA astronaut, flew on STS-106 Atlantis, 2000
- Mark T. Maybury, chief scientist of U.S. Air Force
- Nimai Mukhopadhyay, physics
- Pat Munday (1981), environmentalist
- Heidi Jo Newberg (1987), professor of astrophysics at RPI
- James "Kibo" Parry, satirist, Usenet personality, and typeface designer
- Henry Augustus Rowland (1870), first president of the American Physical Society; Johns Hopkins University's first physics professor
- Mark Russinovich, Windows software engineer
- Peter Schwartz, futurist and writer
- Marlan Scully, physicist known for work in quantum optics
- Robert C. Seacord, computer security specialist and author
- Andrew Sears, computer science professor at UMBC
- Kip Siegel (1948), physicist, professor of physics at the University of Michigan
- George Soper (1895), managing director of the American Society for the Control of Cancer, later the American Cancer Society
- Chauncey Starr (1935), pioneer in nuclear energy
- John L. Swigert Jr. (1965), astronaut, member of Apollo 13; recipient of 1970 Presidential Medal of Freedom; elected to U.S. House of Representatives for Colorado, 1982
- Dennis Tito (1964), millionaire and the first space tourist to pay for his own ticket
- Michael Tuomey (1835), state geologist of South Carolina and Alabama
- Chris Welty (1995), computer scientist
- Reid Wiseman, NASA astronaut, commander of the 2026 Artemis II mission (first crewed near-Moon mission since 1972)
- Chris Wysopal, also known as Weld Pond (1987), member of the hacker think tank L0pht Heavy Industries, founder of Veracode

=== Sports ===
- John Carter (1986), NHL forward 1986–1993
- Kevin Constantine (1980), NHL head coach of the San Jose Sharks 1993–1995, the Pittsburgh Penguins 1997–2000, and the New Jersey Devils 2001–2002; recipient of USA Hockey's Distinguished Achievement Award
- Erin Crocker (2003), NASCAR driver
- Don Cutts (1974), NHL and International Hockey League (1945–2001) goaltender 1974–1984
- Oren Eizenman (born 1985), Israeli-Canadian ice hockey player
- Andrew Franks (2015), NFL placekicker for the Miami Dolphins since 2015
- Tim Friday (1985), NHL defenseman for the Detroit Red Wings 1985–1986
- Ken Hammond (1985), NHL defenseman 1985–1993
- Michael E. Herman (1962), President of the Kansas City Royals of Major League Baseball 1992–2000
- Joé Juneau (1991), NHL forward 1991–2004, selected to the 1993 NHL All-Rookie Team, top scorer at the 1992 Winter Olympics while playing for the Canadian Olympic hockey team
- Jason Kasdorf (2016), NHL goalie for the Buffalo Sabres since 2016
- Neil Little (1994), NHL scout for the Philadelphia Flyers organization; goaltending coach for the Philadelphia Phantoms of the American Hockey League 2007–2008; AHL goaltender 1994–2005; won the '97–98 and '04-05 Calder Cup with the Philadelphia Phantoms; inducted into the Philadelphia Phantoms Hall of Fame in 2006
- Andrew Lord (2008), professional ice hockey player
- Mike McPhee (1982), NHL forward 1983–1994; won the '85–86 Stanley Cup with the Montreal Canadiens; played in the 1989 NHL All Star Game
- Matt Murley (2002), NHL forward 2003–2008
- Kraig Nienhuis (1985), NHL forward 1985–1988
- Adam Oates (1985), co-head coach of the New Jersey Devils 2014–2015; head coach of the Washington Capitals 2012–2014; assistant coach for the Tampa Bay Lightning 2009–2010 and the New Jersey Devils 2010–2012; NHL forward 1985–2004; played in the 1991–1994 and 1997 NHL All Star Games; inducted into the NHL Hockey Hall of Fame as a player in 2012
- Matt Patricia (1996), senior football advisor New England Patriots
- Brian Pothier (2000), NHL defenseman 2000–2010
- Daren Puppa (1985), NHL goaltender 1985–2000, played in the 1990 NHL All Star Game
- Brad Tapper (2000), head coach of the Adirondack Thunder of the ECHL; NHL forward for the Atlanta Thrashers 2000–2003
- Graeme Townshend (1989), head coach of the Jamaican Men's National Ice Hockey Team; player development coordinator for the San Jose Sharks 2004–2008, NHL forward 1990–1994
- Will Reilly (2020), professional ice hockey player

== Faculty ==
=== Past ===
- Sharon Anderson-Gold, Science and Technology Studies
- George C. Baldwin (1967–1977), Nuclear Engineering
- Bimal Kumar Bose (1971–1976), Electrical Engineering
- George Hammell Cook (1842–1846), senior professor, Geology
- Richard DiPrima (1957–1984), Fluid Dynamics
- Amos Eaton (1824–1842), first professor, Geology
- Michael James Gaffey (1984–2001), Planetary Science
- Sorab K. Ghandhi (1963–1992), Electronic Materials, Microelectronics
- Benjamin Franklin Greene (1846–1859), third senior professor and first director of RPI
- James Hall (1833–1850), Geology and Chemistry
- Granville Hicks (1929–1935), English
- Matthew A. Hunter, Metallurgy, first to isolate titanium metal
- Annette Kolodny, English
- Matthew Koss (1990–2000), Physics
- Robert J. Linhardt (–2025), Bioengineering
- Edith Hirsch Luchins, Mathematics
- James D. Meindl (1986–1993), Microelectronics
- Henry Bradford Nason, Chemistry
- E. Bruce Nauman (1981–2009), Chemical Engineering
- Gina O'Connor (1988–2018), Business
- Pauline Oliveros, Music
- Robert Resnick (1956–1993), Physics
- George Rickey, Architecture
- Neil Rolnick, Music, founder of iEAR
- David Rosowsky, Civil Engineering
- Henry Augustus Rowland (1870?–1876), Physics
- Lee Segel (1960–1973), Mathematics
- Stephen Van Rensselaer, founder of the institute
- William A. Wallace (1935–2025), Decision Sciences and Engineering Systems
- Robert H. Wentorf, Jr., Chemical Engineering

=== Current ===
- Robert A. Baron, Psychology
- Laura K. Boyer, Science and Technology Studies
- Selmer Bringsjord, Artificial Intelligence, Logic
- Linnda R. Caporael, Science and Technology Studies
- Jonathan Dordick, Biochemical Engineering
- Evan Douglis, Architecture
- Faye Duchin, Economics
- Ron Eglash, Science and Technology Studies
- Peter Fox, Earth and Environmental Science, Computer Science, Cognitive Science
- Ivar Giaever, Physics Professor Emeritus
- Wayne D. Gray, Cognitive Science
- Juergen Hahn, Biomedical Engineering
- James Hendler, Computer Science
- Xavier Intes, Biomedical Engineering
- Nikhil Koratkar, Nanotechnology
- Deborah McGuinness, Computer Science
- Don Millard, Electrical Engineering, Electronic Media
- David Musser, Computer Science
- Leik Myrabo, Spacecraft Propulsion
- Satish Nambisan, Management
- Heidi Jo Newberg, Astrophysics
- Sal Restivo, Science and Technology Studies
- Morgan Schaller, Earth and Environmental Science
- Michael Shur, Semiconductor Electronics
- Ron Sun, Cognitive Science
- Boleslaw Szymanski, Computer Science
- Jeff Trinkle, Computer Science
- Ge Wang, Biomedical Engineering
- E. Bruce Watson, Earth and Environmental Science
- Langdon Winner, Science and Technology Studies
- Houman Younessi, Systems Engineering (Hartford)
- George Xu, Mechanical, Aerospace and Nuclear
- Xi-Cheng Zhang, Physics and Terahertz Technology
