= Rensselaer at Work =

Online division of Rensselaer Polytechnic Institute

Coordinates: 41.773584°N 72.67328°W

RPI at Work
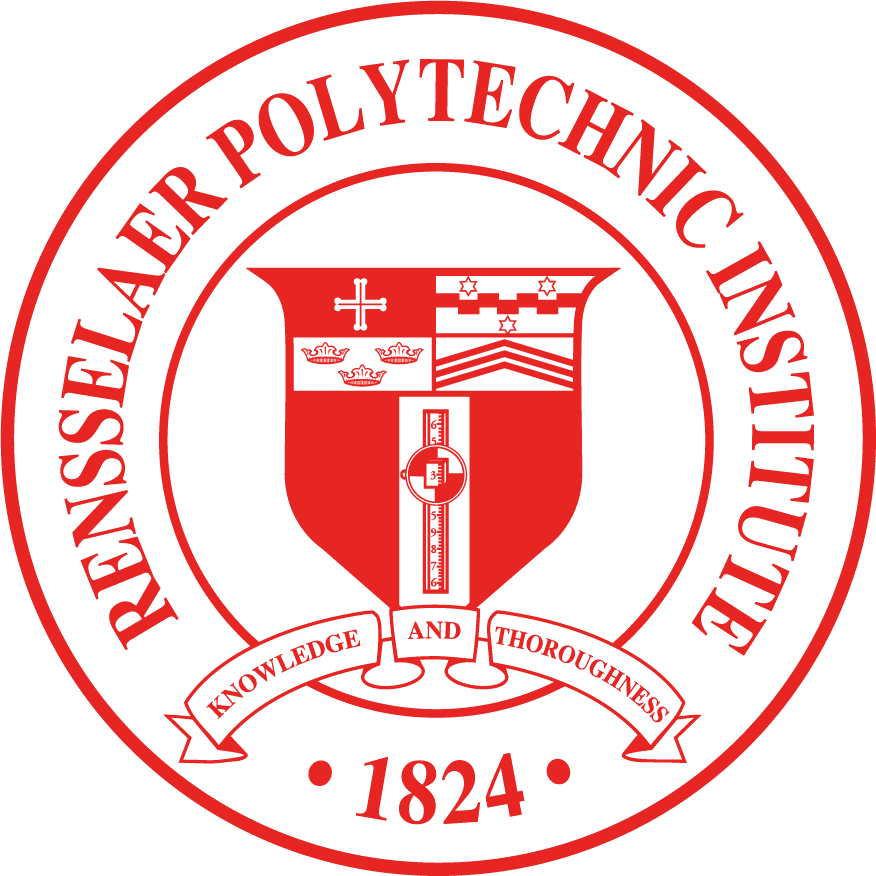
- Type: Private university constituent
- Established: 1955; 71 years ago
- President: Martin A. Schmidt
- Dean: Liad Wagman
- Postgraduates: 150
- Location: Hartford, Connecticut, United States
- Campus: Urban,14 acres
- Website: rpiatwork.rpi.edu
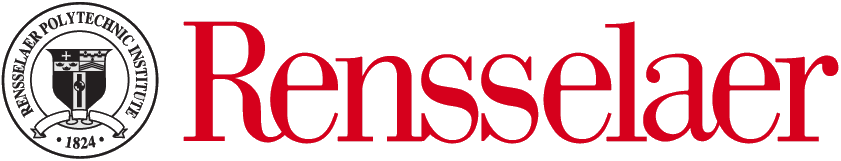

RPI at Work is the online division of Rensselaer Polytechnic Institute. From 1955 to 2023 it operated administratively from facilities in Hartford, Connecticut, though the leadership team is now split between the main campus in Troy, NY and others distributed throughout the US. Until 1997, RPI at Work was known as the Hartford Graduate Center. The primary focus of the division is to offer professional education to learners across the country via its digital delivery.

== History ==
The Hartford Graduate Center was established in 1955 by Rensselaer and the United Aircraft Corp (a predecessor to Raytheon Technologies) to address a shortage of scientists and engineers in southern New England. United Aircraft bought and equipped the first building and provided annual financing so that its employees could earn graduate degrees at no individual cost. These programs were also made open to professionals employed at other area organizations.

The Graduate Center began with 220 students and seven faculty members who relocated from Rensselaer's main campus in Troy, NY to Connecticut, along with adjunct professors from local industry. An additional campus was founded in Groton, Connecticut, to respond to the educational demands of Electric Boat, a subsidiary of General Dynamics and Pfizer. By the late 1990s, with students from more than 100 corporations, attendance grew to nearly 2,000 students.

In December 1996, trustees of both Rensselaer and the Hartford Graduate Center voted to transfer Hartford's assets and have it more directly controlled by RPI. Under the new arrangement, Hartford had its own board of trustees, named by the Rensselaer president.

In 1997, the Hartford Graduate Center was renamed Rensselaer at Hartford, and after a new digital transformation, it has become RPI at Work.

== Campus ==
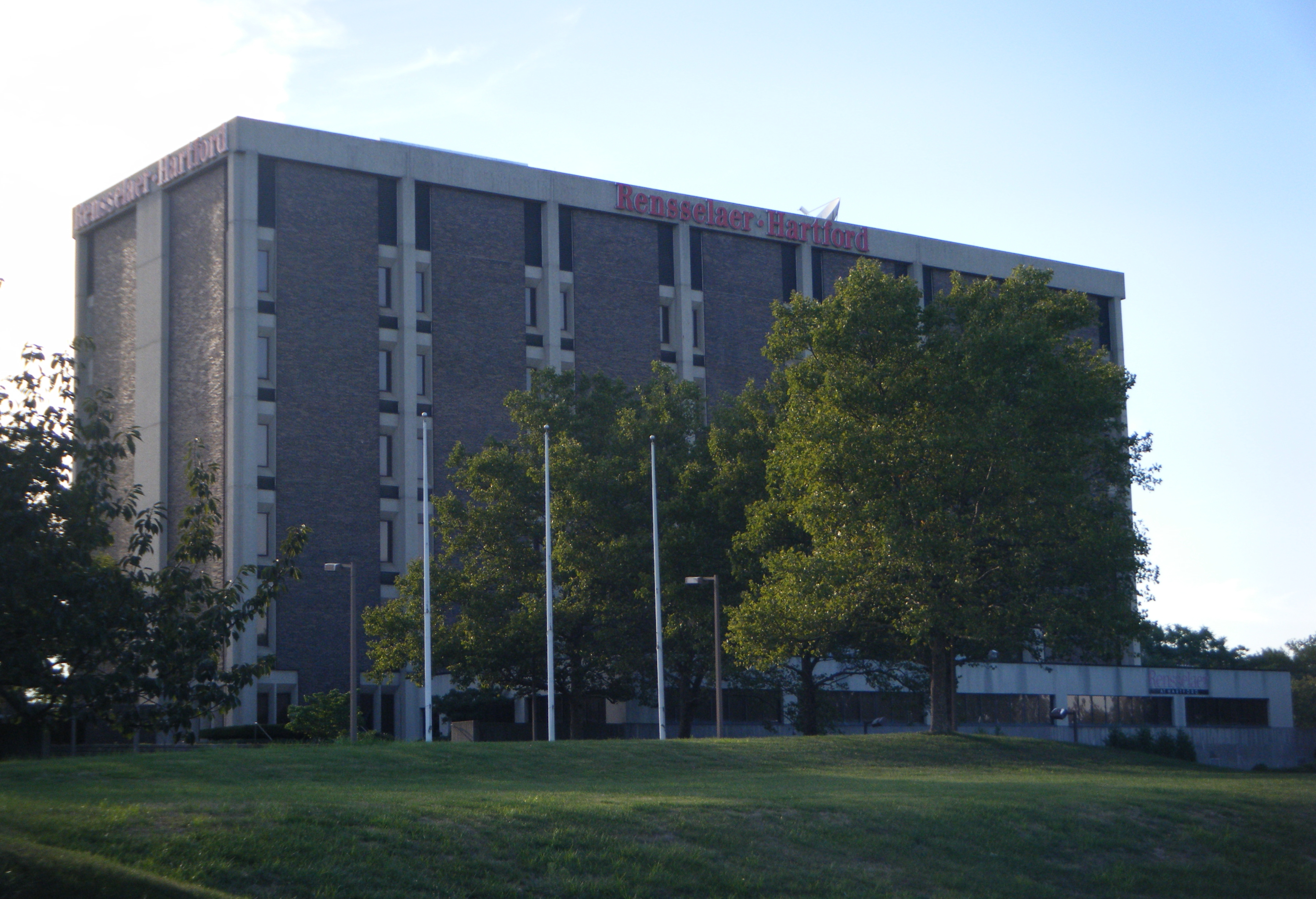
Main building

From 1955 to 2023, the Hartford center had a 14-acre (5.7 ha) landscaped campus readily accessible from both Interstates 84 and 91. The center of the campus contained the main building, the "Tower Building" which contained about 30 classrooms, each seating 10–50 persons. Adjacent to the Tower Building was "Seminar Hall", with additional classrooms and a small auditorium, which was rented for conferences and special events. Since moving to an entirely digital format of instruction for working professionals, the Institute has closed both the Groton and Hartford facilities, with faculty and staff distributed across the US.

== Notable alumni ==
- Erroll M. Brown, USCG rear admiral, 13th District Commander (Ret.)
- Thomas J. Haas, American academic
- Jon Hall (programmer), board chair, Linux Professional Institute
- Richard Mastracchio, engineer and NASA astronaut
- Steven H. Ratti, USCG rear admiral, Joint Interagency Task Force West Commander (Ret.)
- Jack Swigert, engineer, politician, Apollo 13 Astronaut
- John S. Thackrah, Assistant Secretary of the Navy (former)
- Dennis Tito, engineer, entrepreneur, world's first space tourist

== See also ==
- Houman Younessi, assistant dean of academic programs, director of RISE
