= Koratkar =

Koratkar is an Indian surname belonging to Deshastha Brahmin community.

- Keshav Rao Koratkar, was a pioneer of political, social and educational reforms in Hyderabad State, India.
- Nikhil Koratkar is an Endowed Chair Professor of Mechanical Engineering and Materials Science at Rensselaer Polytechnic Institute.
- Vinayak Rao Koratkar, was a political leader in Hyderabad State and Member of 2nd Lok Sabha.
