= Shirley Ann Jackson =

American physicist (born 1946)

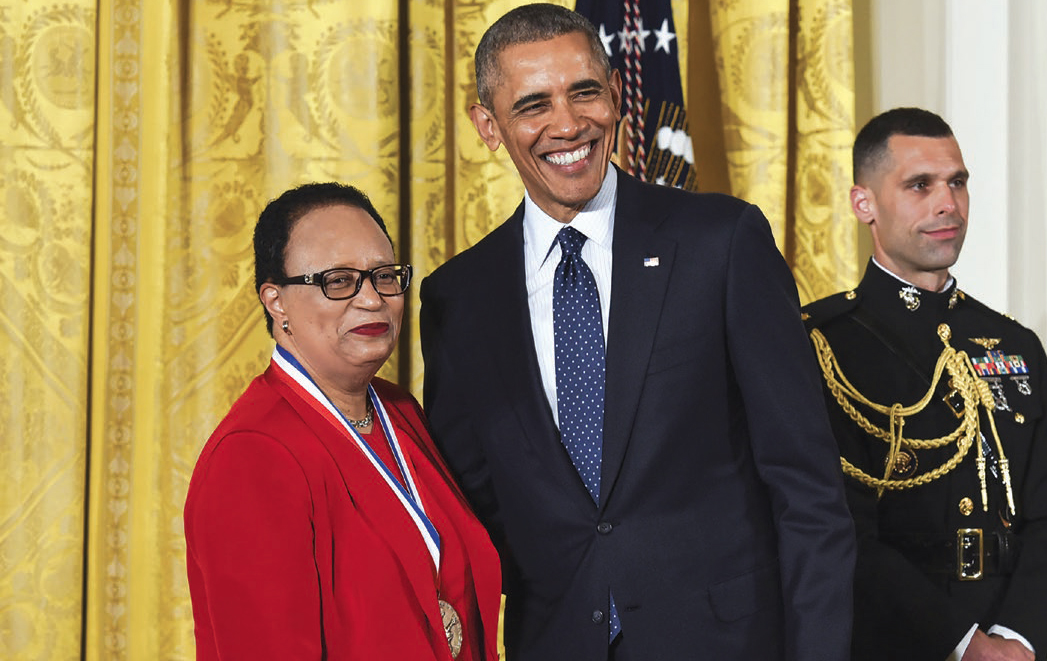

Chair of the President's Intelligence Advisory Board
- In office August 29, 2014 – January 20, 2017 Serving with Jami Miscik
- President: Barack Obama
- Preceded by: David Boren; Chuck Hagel
- Succeeded by: Steve Feinberg

President of Rensselaer Polytechnic Institute
- In office July 1, 1999 – July 1, 2022
- Preceded by: Cornelius Barton
- Succeeded by: Martin A. Schmidt

Personal details
- Born: Shirley Ann Jackson; August 5, 1946 (age 80) Washington, D.C., U.S.
- Spouse: Morris Washington
- Education: Roosevelt High School; MIT (BS, MS, PhD)
- Website: Official website

Shirley Ann Jackson (born August 5, 1946) is an African American physicist and the 18th president of Rensselaer Polytechnic Institute. She is the first African American woman to earn a doctorate at the Massachusetts Institute of Technology (MIT), in Theoretical Elementary Particle Physics. She is also the second African American woman in the United States to earn a doctorate in physics.

== Biography ==
Jackson was born in Washington, D.C., and attended Roosevelt Senior High School. After graduation in 1964, she enrolled at MIT to study theoretical physics, earning her B.S. degree in 1968.

Jackson elected to stay at MIT for her doctoral work and received her Ph.D. degree in nuclear physics in 1973, becoming the first African American woman to earn a doctorate degree from MIT. Her research was directed by James Young, a professor in the MIT Center for Theoretical Physics. Jackson is also the second African American woman in the United States to earn a doctorate in physics. She was featured on the PBS show Finding Your Roots, Season 6, Episode 7, where she was noted as one of the leading global pioneers in science while knowing little about her ancestry. In 2002, Discover magazine recognized her as one of the 50 most important women in science.

=== AT&T Bell Laboratories ===
Jackson joined the Theoretical Physics Research Department at AT&T Bell Laboratories in 1976, where she examined the fundamental properties of various materials. She began her time at Bell Labs by studying materials to be used in the semiconductor industry. She worked in the Scattering and Low Energy Physics Research Department beginning in 1978 and moved to the Solid State and Quantum Physics Research Department in 1988. At Bell Labs, Jackson researched the optical and electronic properties of two-dimensional and quasi-two-dimensional systems.

Jackson served on the faculty at Rutgers University in Piscataway and New Brunswick, New Jersey, from 1991 to 1995, in addition to continuing to consult with Bell Labs on semiconductor theory. Her research during this time focused on the electronic and optical properties of two-dimensional systems.

Although some sources claim that Jackson conducted scientific research while working at Bell Laboratories that enabled others to invent the portable fax, touch-tone telephone, solar cells, fiber optic cables, and the technology behind caller ID and call waiting, Jackson herself has made no such claim. Moreover, these telecommunications advancements significantly predated her arrival at Bell Labs in 1976, with these six specifically enumerated inventions occurring between 1954 and 1970.

=== U.S. Nuclear Regulatory Commission ===
In 1995, she was appointed by President Bill Clinton to serve as chairman of the US Nuclear Regulatory Commission (NRC), becoming the first woman and first African American to hold that position. At the NRC, she had "ultimate authority for all NRC functions pertaining to an emergency involving an NRC licensee". In addition, while Jackson served on the commission, she assisted in the establishment of the International Nuclear Regulators Association. Jackson served as the chairperson for the International Regulators Association from 1997 to 1999. The association consisted of senior nuclear regulatory officials from countries like Canada, France, Germany, and Spain.

=== Rensselaer Polytechnic Institute ===
On July 1, 1999, Jackson became the 18th president of Rensselaer Polytechnic Institute (RPI). Jackson's goal for Rensselaer is "to achieve prominence in the 21st century as a top-tier world-class technological research university, with global reach and global impact." She was the first woman and first African American to hold this position. Since her appointment to president of RPI, Jackson has helped raise over $1 billion in donations for philanthropic causes.

She led the development of a strategic initiative called The Rensselaer Plan and much progress has been made towards achieving the Plan's goals. She oversaw a large capital improvement campaign, including the construction of an Experimental Media and Performing Arts Center costing $200 million, and the East Campus Athletic Village.

On April 26, 2006, the faculty of RPI (including a number of ‘’emeritus’’ faculty) voted 155 to 149 against a vote of no-confidence in Jackson.

After arriving at RPI, Jackson's salary and benefits expanded from $423,150 in 1999–2000 to over $1.3 million in 2006–2007. In 2011 Jackson's salary was $1.75 million, and it is estimated she received another $1.3 million from board seats at several major corporations. The announcement of layoffs at RPI in December 2008 led some in the RPI community to question whether the institute should continue to compensate Jackson at that level, maintain a residence in the Adirondacks for her, and continue to support a personal staff. Her presidency created much controversy in the student body; in 2011, the RPI Student Senate passed a motion to request that the administration review her performance and consider her removal due to a "broad sense of dissatisfaction and low morale among students, faculty, staff and alumni, particularly in opposition to the Institute and President Jackson's leadership" and her "top down leadership, [and] abrasive style."

On December 4–5, 2009 Jackson celebrated her tenth year at RPI with a "Celebration Weekend," which featured tribute concerts by Aretha Franklin and Joshua Bell among other events. Following the weekend, the board of trustees announced they would support construction of a new guest house on Jackson's property, for the purpose of "[enabling] the presidents to receive and entertain, appropriately, Rensselaer constituents, donors, and other high-level visitors." The trustees said that "the funds for this new project would not have been available for any other purpose." William Walker, the school's Vice President of Strategic Communications and External Relations noted "The Board sees this very much as a long-term investment... for President Jackson and her successors."

On February 2, 2010, the Troy Zoning Board of Appeals denied RPI's request for a zoning variance allowing them to construct the new house at a height of 44 feet (13 m), which would exceed the 25-foot (7.6 m) height restriction on buildings in residential areas. The zoning board stated that it is "too big," and two firefighters believed the property would be difficult to access with emergency vehicles. A new plan was announced on February 25, describing how the president's house will be replaced with a new two-story house. The new house will have "9,600 square feet of livable space, divided approximately equally between living space for the president's family and rooms for the president to conduct meetings and events."

In June 2010, it was announced that the Rensselaer Board of Trustees unanimously voted to extend Jackson a ten-year contract renewal, which she accepted. Jackson's compensation ranked first among US private university presidents in 2014.

A 2015 Money.com article cited Jackson as the highest-paid college President and "took home a base salary of $945,000 plus another $276,474 in bonuses, $31,874 in nontaxable benefits".

In the fall of 2018, another contract extension was approved by the board of trustees through the end of June 2022.

On June 25, 2021, Jackson publicly announced she would be stepping down from her post as president as of July 1, 2022, after 23 years.

=== The Nature Conservancy ===
In February 2020, Jackson joined the Nature Conservancy Global Board. Her term on the board runs through October 2029. Board Chair Tom Tierney says, "To successfully take on the most pressing environmental challenges facing us, TNC needs people with ambition and big ideas."

== Honors and distinctions ==
Jackson has received many fellowships, including the Martin Marietta Aircraft Company Scholarship and Fellowship, the Prince Hall Masons Scholarship, the National Science Foundation Traineeship, and a Ford Foundation Advanced Study Fellowship. She has been elected to numerous special societies, including the American Philosophical Society. In 2014, she was named a recipient of the National Medal of Science.

In the early 1990s, then-New Jersey Governor James Florio awarded Jackson the Thomas Alva Edison Science Award for her contributions to physics and for the promotion of science.

Jackson received awards for the years 1976 and 1981 as one of the Outstanding Young Women of America. She was inducted into the National Women's Hall of Fame in 1998 for "her significant contributions as a distinguished scientist and advocate for education, science, and public policy." She received a Candace Award for Technology from the National Coalition of 100 Black Women in 1982.

In 2001, she received the Richtmyer Memorial Award given annually by the American Association of Physics Teachers. She has also received 53 honorary doctorate degrees. Most recently, she received an honorary degree from Brandeis University.

In spring 2007, she was awarded the Vannevar Bush Award for "a lifetime of achievements in scientific research, education and senior statesman-like contributions to public policy".

In 2007, she received the Golden Plate Award of the American Academy of Achievement presented by Awards Council member Ben Carson.

In 2008, she became the University Vice Chairman of the US Council on Competitiveness, a nonprofit group based in Washington, DC. In 2009, President Barack Obama appointed Jackson to serve on the President's Council of Advisors on Science and Technology, a 20-member advisory group dedicated to public policy.

She was appointed an International Fellow of the Royal Academy of Engineering (FREng) in 2012.

In 2018, she was awarded the W.E.B Du Bois medal by the Hutchins Center for African American Research. In 2019, the American Physical Society Forum on Physics and Society awarded her the Joseph A. Burton Forum Award.

In 2021, she was the recipient of the Hans Christian Oersted Medal from the American Association of Physics Teachers. Also in 2021, she received, from the UC Berkeley Academic Senate, the Clark Kerr Award for distinguished leadership in higher education.

== Personal life ==
Jackson is married to Morris A. Washington, a physics professor at Rensselaer Polytechnic Institute, and they have one adult son. She is a member of Delta Sigma Theta sorority. While studying at the Massachusetts Institute of Technology, Jackson co-founded the university's Black Students' Union in 1968. She worked with university administrators to improve the recruitment and retention of Black students and expand educational opportunities for underrepresented groups.

== Philanthropy ==
Jackson and her husband were named to the inaugural class of the Capital Region Philanthropy Hall of Fame in 2019.

== See also ==
- Timeline of women in science

Academic offices
Preceded by Cornelius Barton	President of Rensselaer Polytechnic Institute; 1999–2022	Succeeded by Martin A. Schmidt
Government offices
Vacant Title last held by David Boren; Chuck Hagel	Chair of the President's Intelligence Advisory Board; 2014–2017; Served alongside: Jami Miscik	Succeeded by Steve Feinberg
