= Richard Jurek =

American author, numismatist and business executive

- Occupation: Business executive
- Known for: Space historian, author and collector; marketing executive
- Notable work: Marketing the Moon: The Selling of the Apollo Lunar Program (MIT Press 2014) and "The Ultimate Engineer: The Remarkable Life of NASA's Visionary Leader George M. Low" (UNP 2019)

Richard Jurek is an American author, numismatist, and business executive. He is the author of the book The Ultimate Engineer: The Remarkable Life of NASA's Visionary Leader George M. Low and co-authored the book Marketing the Moon: The Selling of the Apollo Lunar Program.

== Space artifact collector ==
Jurek became a aerospace enthusiast and collector of space memorabilia in the 1970s. He first collected autographed space items among other collectables, eventually focusing mainly on astronaut flown personal mementos and artifacts. His collection includes a large selection of space flown numismatic items, including an assemblage of $2 bills signed by astronauts that were carried while in orbit or during lunar landings during the golden age of space exploration. His unique collection of $2 bills carried by astronauts appear in the online Jefferson Space Museum. He has also exhibited pieces from his collection at the Kansas Cosmosphere and the Southern Illinois University Museum His collection has also been covered on PBS and WGN TV's "Backstory with Larry Potash" program.

== Space historian ==
Jurek is the co-author of the 2014 book Marketing the Moon: The Selling of the Apollo Lunar Program, which he cowrote with David Meerman Scott. The book focuses on the use of marketing techniques and marketing agreements between NASA and private industry to promote the importance of the Apollo missions to the US public. He has provided public lectures on the subject as well. The book contains around three hundred images of original ads and marketing materials, cut down from an initial collection of about three thousand. Jurek argues that what occurred during the marketing of the Apollo missions set the precedent of the modern interaction between the public and mass media. For his book he also appeared on the Science Channel's television series NASA's Unexplained Files, as well as the documentary The Two Dollar Bill. He is also a contributor to Air & Space Smithsonian.

He also served as a consulting producer on the 2019 critically acclaimed PBS/American Experience documentary, Chasing the Moon.

In 2019 Jurek released the book The Ultimate Engineer: The Remarkable Life of NASA's Visionary Leader George M. Low. Publishers Weekly said of the book that, "The result of Jurek's extensive research and careful use of detail is a comprehensive portrait of a figure vastly greater in significance than in name recognition." The Library Journal's review declared the book "scholarly, yet accessible and engaging," and "is as much a history of NASA as a biography of George Low, and as such is an important contribution to the history of the agency."

== Business career ==
Jurek is the Chief Marketing and Communication Officer of The Inland Group. Previously, he was a vice president and head of corporate communications at The Northern Trust Company in Chicago.
