= W. & L. E. Gurley Building =

- U.S. National Register of Historic Places
- U.S. National Historic Landmark
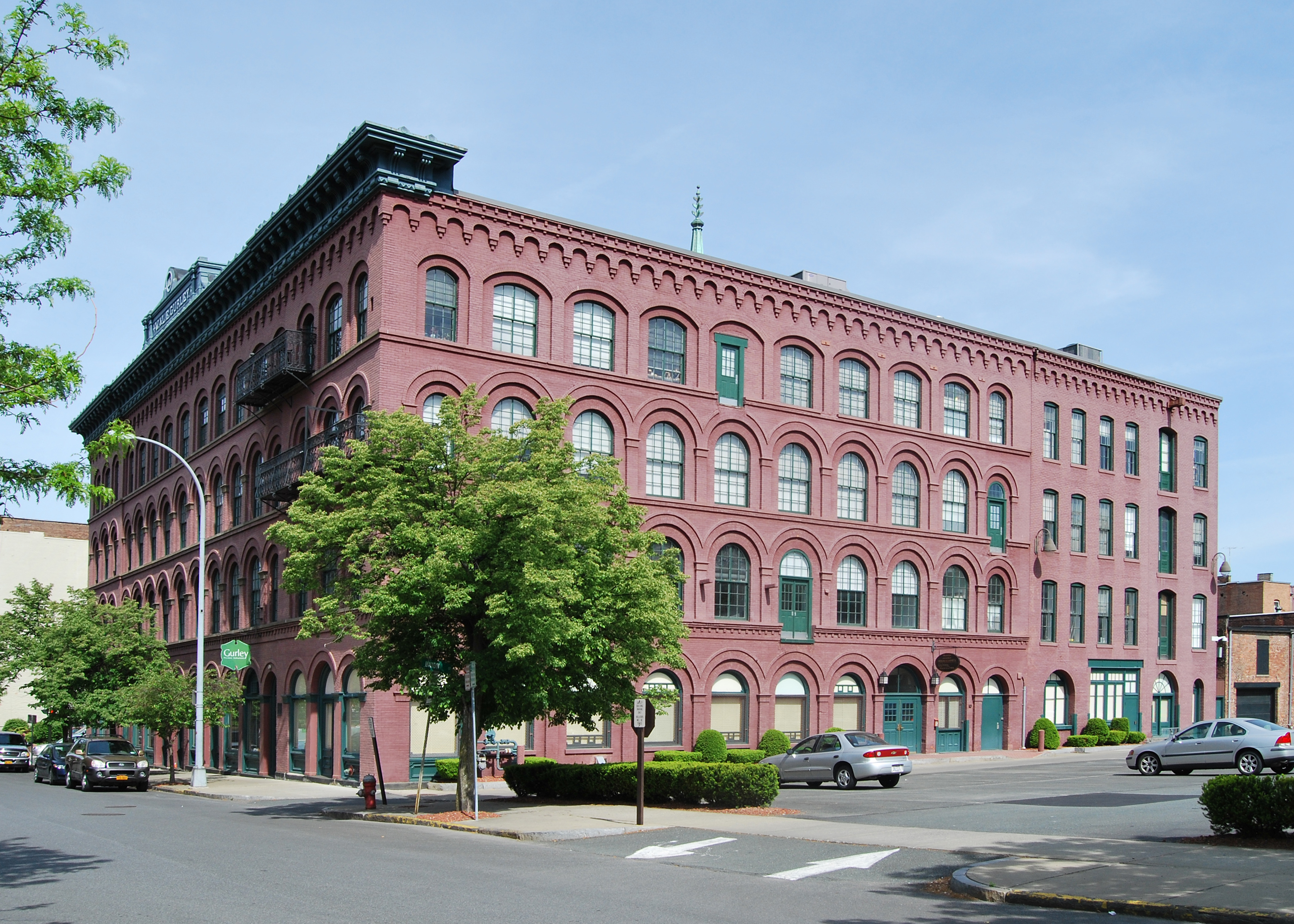
- View from southwest, 2008

- Location within New York Location within the United States
- Location: 514 Fulton Street, Troy, NY
- Coordinates: 42°43′56.52″N 73°41′17.93″W
- Built: 1862
- Architectural style: Classical Revival
- NRHP reference No.: 70000432

Significant dates
- Added to NRHP: March 5, 1970
- Designated NHL: May 4, 1983

The W. & L. E. Gurley Building is a historic industrial building in Troy, New York, United States. Built in 1862, it is a classical revival structure that housed the W. & L. E. Gurley Company, a maker of precision measuring instruments. The Gurley Company was one of the first companies in the nation to make precision instruments. The building was designated a National Historic Landmark in recognition of this in 1983.

== History ==
The Julius Hanks foundry was purchased by the W. & L. E. Gurley Company in 1852, and was destroyed in the Great Troy Fire of 1862. The W. & L. E. Gurley Building was built in "an amazing feat of construction" in just 8 months to replace the previous building. Originally, the first floor space was used for retail with the third and fourth floors leased to other manufacturers. Gradually, Gurley expanded to use the entire buildings.

The company, run by William Gurley and his brother, Lewis Ephraim, were leaders in the field and published a regularly updated manual of instruments and their operations and were engaged in producing military products for the American Civil War, which included "brass fuse-plugs for naval projectiles and an improved type of brass trimming for saddle trees." In the 1960s, the company was acquired by Teledyne Company, and was sold again in 1993 and continues as Gurley Precision Instruments today.

The building was declared a National Historic Landmark in 1983. The building is currently rented by Rensselaer Polytechnic Institute, and houses its Lighting Research Center, which moved there in 2000, and a few acoustics labs associated with the school of architecture as well as the Human Resources department. Gurley Precision Instruments still occupies the first floor of the building and the entire building directly across the street.

It is located on Fulton Street between 5th and Union Streets in Troy.

== Architecture ==
The building is a four-story red brick building, U-shaped around a small courtyard. A foundry was at ground level on the north side of the courtyard. The building's foundation is made of stone with brick bearing walls and cast-iron interior columns. The building’s classical revival exterior includes arched doors and windows with semicircular brick arches and hoodmoulds. Entrances are asymmetrical with the main entrance located on Fulton Street.

Originally, the first floor space was used for retail with the third and fourth floors leased to other manufacturers. Gradually, Gurley expanded to use the entire buildings.

== HAER photos ==
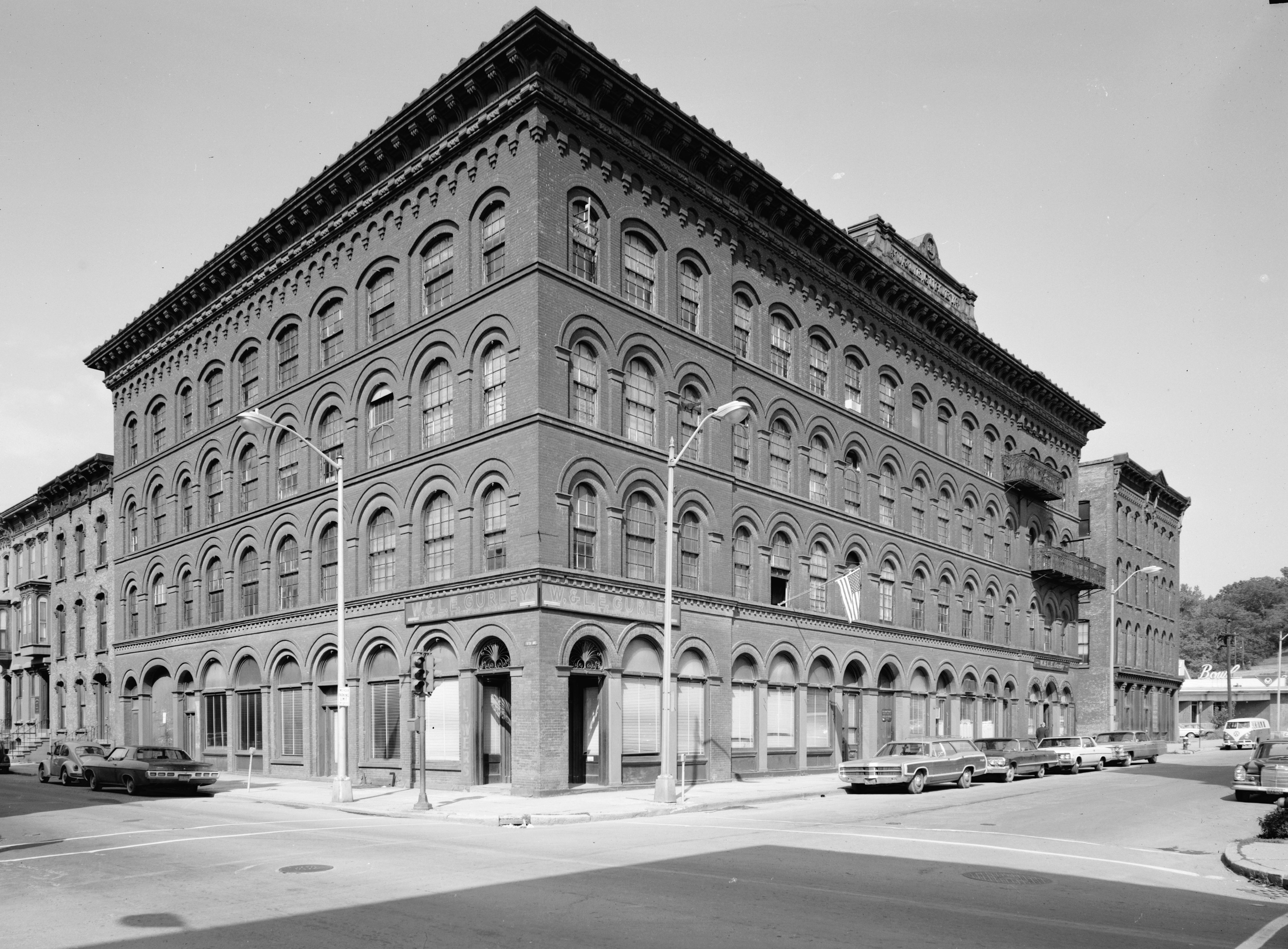
1969 HAER photo

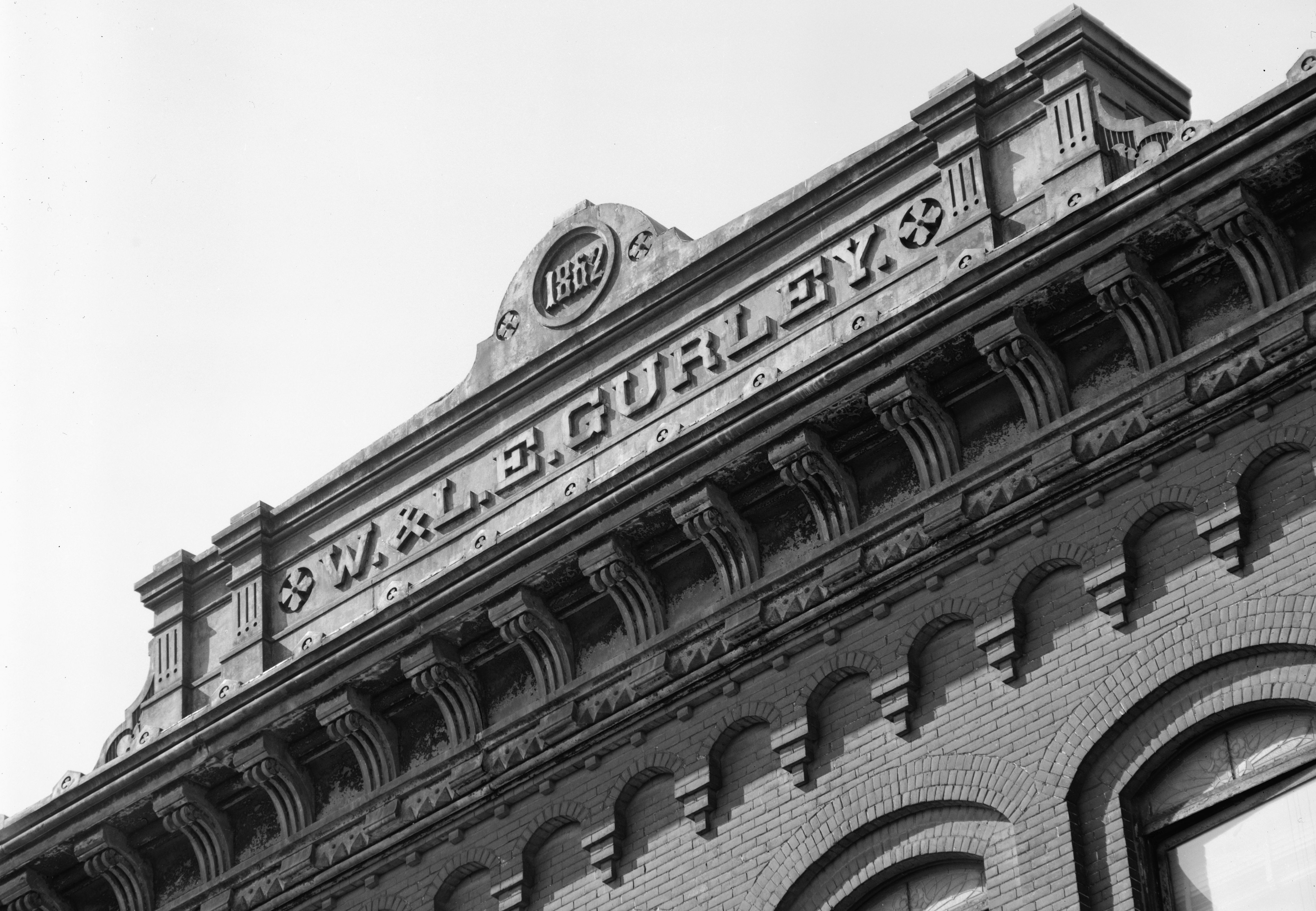
Cornice detail
