= Stanley I. Landgraf =

American academic

Stanley I. Landgraf (July 29, 1925 – June 29, 1997) was a business executive and the acting president of Rensselaer Polytechnic Institute from 1987 to 1988.

He was born on July 29, 1925, in Saugerties, New York. From 1943 to 1946, he served in the U.S. Navy as an officer on the destroyer USS Watts. He and his wife Barbara had three children; Curtis, Joseph and Sharon. He received bachelor's degrees in metallurgical engineering and management engineering from Rensselaer in 1946 and 1947 respectively. In 1947, he joined Mohawk Carpet Mills of Amsterdam, New York, which grew through mergers to become the Mohasco Corporation. In 1974, he was elected president of the company and in 1978, he was named chief executive officer. In 1980, he became chairman and in 1985 he retired from the company. From 1985 to 1995, he was president of the Capital Region Technology Development Council, which provided technology and managerial support to Albany-area startup companies and helped them meet investors. He also served as a director of several companies, including Albany International, Huffy Corporation and Victory Funds.

He was elected to the Rensselaer board of trustees in 1977. From 1987 to 1988, he was acting president of Rensselaer. He received the Distinguished Service Award from Rensselaer in 1988. He died on June 29, 1997. Since 1998, the computer science department at Rensselaer presents an annual award in his honor to "a computer science major who excels in leadership skills and academic achievement."

Academic offices
Preceded by Daniel Berg	President of Rensselaer Polytechnic Institute; 1987 – 1988	Succeeded by Roland W. Schmitt
