= Cornelius J. Barton =

American businessman (1936–2024)

Cornelius J. Barton (March 28, 1936 – July 12, 2024) was an American metallurgical engineer, businessman and the acting president of Rensselaer Polytechnic Institute (RPI) from April 1998 until July 1999.

He received bachelor's, master's and Ph.D. degrees in metallurgical engineering from RPI. He was a member of the engineering honor society Sigma Xi and was a brother of the Delta Phi social fraternity. After his undergraduate work, from 1958 to 1961, he was employed as a Metallurgical Process Engineer at Olin's Nuclear Fuel Division, which manufactured nuclear reactor cores for the United States Navy. In 1961, Barton returned to RPI for graduate work in Engineering. Upon earning an M.S. and Ph.D. in metallurgical engineering, he joined US Steel's Research Laboratory in Monroeville, Pennsylvania, as a research manager in the Advanced Applied Research Division. While at US Steel, he authored several research papers in refereed journals, submitted patent applications for novel steel compositions, and completed a project sponsored by the United States Air Force for improvements and problem solving in a complex high-strength, high-performance family of steels.

Barton then joined Chase Brass & Copper in 1969, a subsidiary of Kennecott Copper, as Director of Research and Development. From 1975 to 1980, he was General Manager of Chase Nuclear In 1981, he returned to Chase Headquarters in Shaker Heights, Ohio, to serve as Vice President, Technology, of Kennecott Engineered Systems. When Standard Oil of Ohio acquired Kennecott, the technologies of several Standard Oil manufacturing subsidiaries joined KESCO Technologies, and Barton's unit was renamed the Standard Oil Chemicals and Industrial Products Co. Technology Group. During the mergers & acquisitions activities engaged by Kennecott, Dorr Oliver was acquired. Dorr Oliver's business was twofold: the separation of liquids from solids, for instance by centrifugation, and the application of Fluid-Bed technology to a variety of process engineering, and incineration activities, including coal-fired boilers with sulphur capture. Dorr Oliver was an International Corporation with 16 subsidiaries in Europe, Asia, North and South America and Licensees in Japan and South Africa.

In 1986, Barton was appointed President of Dorr Oliver. Shortly thereafter, BP acquired Standard Oil and re-shaped and re-organized the energy activities. Dorr Oliver was sold, and LBO Group bought the company; Barton remained as President and CEO of Dorr Oliver. The Management of Dorr Oliver subsequently performed a management buyout to take the company and manage it for growth. A significant period of world-wide growth occurred, leading ultimately to an offer of purchase for the company

In 1992, Harriman bought a 20 percent stake in Dorr Oliver. Dorr Oliver was then sold to a German company in 1995, and Barton retired as President after more than twelve years in that position.

He was a member of the Rensselaer Board of Trustees beginning in 1991 until he passed (as an active trustee from May 1991 through December 2012, and subsequently a trustee emeritus), and was the interim president of RPI from April 1998 until July 1999, until President Shirley Ann Jackson was recruited. Barton Hall, a residence hall on the RPI campus that opened in 2000, was named in his honor. Barton died on July 12, 2024, at the age of 88.

Academic offices
Preceded by R. Byron Pipes	President of Rensselaer Polytechnic Institute; 1998–1999	Succeeded by Shirley Ann Jackson
