= Nimai Mukhopadhyay =

American physicist

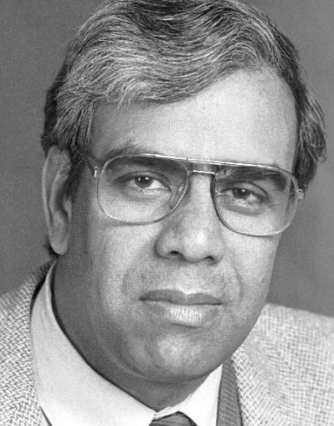
- Born: January 17, 1944; Maharampur, India
- Died: May 15, 2000 (aged 56); Loudonville, New York
- Education: University of Calcutta (BSc); University of Chicago (PhD)
- Known for: Meson production and Delta baryons
- Awards: 1997 Humboldt Prize
- Scientific career
- Fields: High-energy nuclear physics
- Workplaces: University of Maryland, College Park; Paul Scherrer Institute; Rensselaer Polytechnic Institute

Nimai Mukhopadhyay (January 17, 1944 – May 15, 2000) was a professor of physics at Rensselaer Polytechnic Institute and a theoretical physicist, specializing in the nuclear aspects of the weak interactions.

During the early 1980s and into the mid-1990s, Nimai's research advanced the fields of photoproduction and electroproduction of baryon resonances involving pion and eta decay. His work included discoveries on the properties of the Phi_meson, Pion scattering, the theory of eta photo production and electroproduction, and approaches to perturbative results in the N-Delta Transition.

== Early life and education ==
Mukhopadhyay was born on 17 January 1942 in Maharampur (near city of Kolkatta), West Bengal, India. He earned a Bachelor of Science degree in Physics from University of Calcutta, India in 1963 and S.M. and PhD in theoretical nuclear physics from University of Chicago in 1968.

== Career and Research ==
From 1972 to 1981, Mukhopadhyay did research at University of Maryland, College Park, and the Paul Scherrer Institute (formerly Swiss Institute of Nuclear Research) in Villigen. In 1981, Mukhopadhyay joined Rensselaer Polytechnic Institute as professor in the Physics Department and helped establish theoretical program complimenting to the existing experimental program in photonuclear physics.

In 1993, he was elected fellow of the American Physical Society. In 1997, Mukhopadhyay was awarded the Humboldt Senior Scientist Prize for his work.
