= David Rosowsky =

American civil engineer

David V. Rosowsky is an American civil engineer who is the former Vice President for Research at Kansas State University. Rosowsky is the former Provost and Senior Vice President at the University of Vermont. He previously served as the Dean of Engineering at Rensselaer Polytechnic Institute. Prior to that, he was Head of the Department of Civil Engineering at Texas A&M and a faculty member at Clemson. Widely known for his work applying probability models to building structural safety in natural hazards, he is member of the editorial board for the journal Structural Safety. He is a graduate of Tufts University, holds a Ph.D. in civil engineering from Johns Hopkins University, and is a fellow of the American Society of Civil Engineers.
