= Xavier Intes =

French physicist and biomedical engineer

Xavier Intes is a French professor of physics and biomedical engineering and co-director of the BioImaging Center at the Rensselaer Polytechnic Institute.

== Life and career ==
Intes had obtained his B.S., M.S. and Ph.D. degrees in physics from University of Western Brittany in 1992, 1994, and 1998 respectively. In 1999 he joined Britton Chance's laboratory as a postdoc at the University of Pennsylvania and under his mentorship studied biochemistry and biophysics of radiology. He also did postdoctoral training at the Department of Astronomy and Physics where Arjun Yodh was his mentor. From 2001 to 2003, he served as the director at the Research of the Medical Diagnostic Research Foundation and at the Research of Optical Devices. He also served as Chief Scientist in Advanced Research Technologies from 2003 to 2006. Since 2006, he is a part of Rensselaer Polytechnic Institute's faculty where he now currently serves as a professor in the Department of Biomedical Engineering.

== Awards and fellowships ==
- Fellow of the AIMBE (2016)
- Fellow of the SPIE (2019)
- Fellow of the OSA (2019)
