= Houman Younessi =

American computer scientist (1963–2016)

- Born: May 28, 1963; Tehran, Iran
- Died: 23 March 2016 (aged 52); Manchester, Connecticut, U.S.
- Education: Swinburne University of Technology (Ph. D, M.S.), Rensselaer Polytechnic Institute (B.S., M.S.)
- Scientific career
- Fields: Software engineering, information systems, bioinformatics, molecular biology, systems biology and functional genomics
- Workplaces: University of Connecticut, Rensselaer Polytechnic Institute

Houman Younessi (28 May 1963 – 23 March 2016) was an Iranian-American educator, practitioner, consultant and investigator in informatics, large scale software development processes, computer science, decision science, molecular biology and functional genomics. He was a research professor at University of Connecticut, and was previously the head of faculty and professor at Hartford Graduate Campus of Rensselaer Polytechnic Institute in Hartford, Connecticut and prior to that, a member of the faculty at Swinburne University of Technology in Hawthorn, Victoria, Australia where he attained tenure in 1997.

Younessi was recognized for his work in the fields of defect management, software and system development processes and was an authority in object-oriented computing. Examples of his work include the OPEN and the SBM methodologies and, more recently, recombinant programming.

A multi-disciplinarian, Younessi was also trained in molecular biology, genomics and bioinformatics. His primary interest was in systems and functional biology, particularly work that pertains to disease and development. He also holds a master's degree in management, specializing in realistic alternative frameworks in economics and finance.

Younessi died on 23 March 2016, due to complications arising from small cell lung cancer. Younessi had survived four bouts of cancer since an initial diagnosis of malignant chordoma in 2009.
