= Gina O'Connor =

French management academic

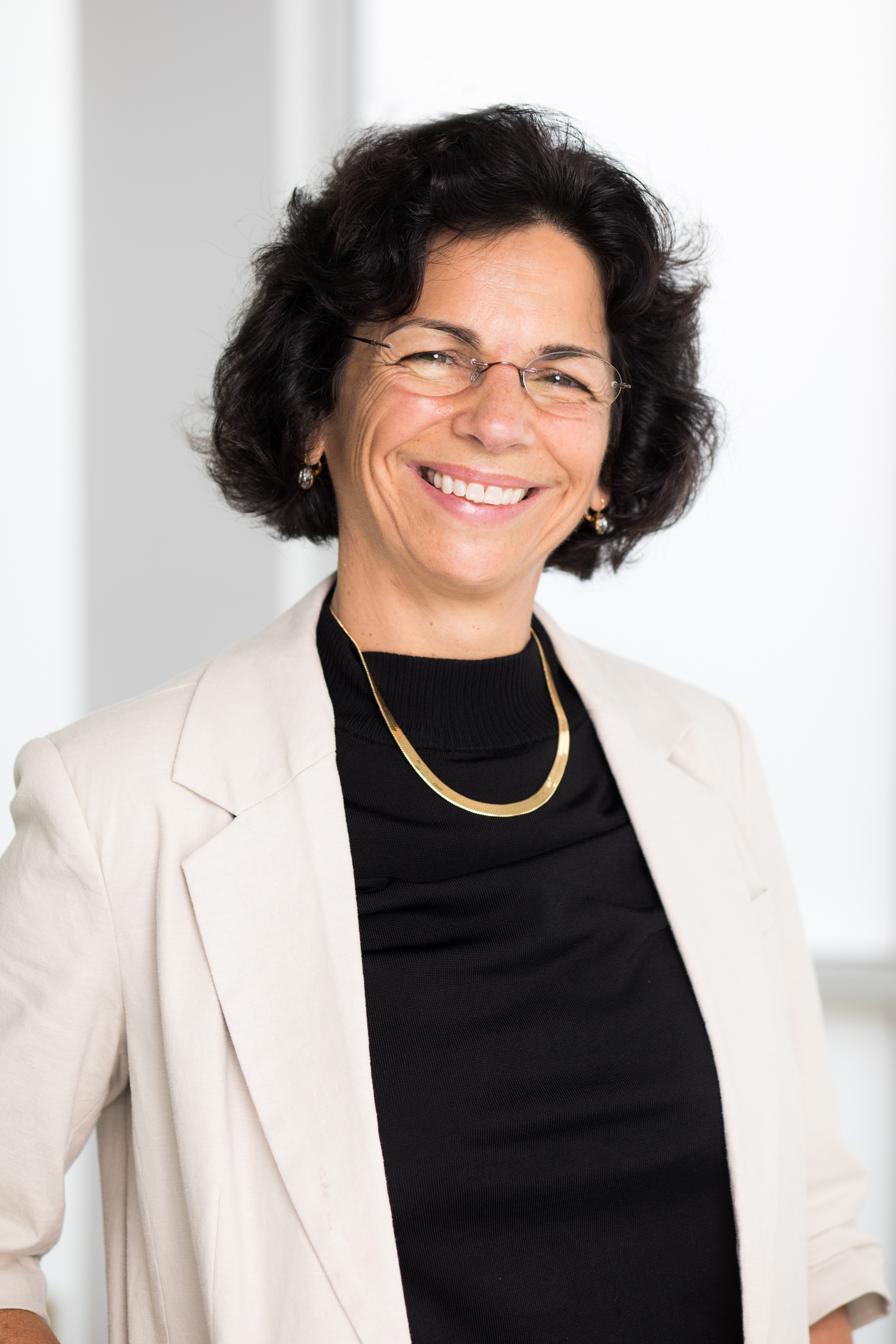
- Occupation: Professor
- Known for: Research and advising on building a capability for Strategic Innovation in large mature companies

Academic background
- Education: Ph.D Marketing and Corporate Strategy, New York University MBA Finance, St. Louis University BA Psychology, St. Louis University
- Alma mater: New York University

Academic work
- Discipline: Innovation management
- Institutions: Rensselaer Polytechnic Institute; Babson College

Gina Colarelli O'Connor is professor of innovation management at Babson College, where she has worked since January 2019. She leads Babson's executive education programs in corporate innovation.

From 1988 to 2018, she was professor of marketing and innovation management in the Lally School of Management at Rensselaer Polytechnic Institute. There she was associate dean for academic affairs, director of the Lally School's MBA/MS programs, director of the Severino Center for Technology Entrepreneurship, and academic director of the Executive MBA program.

At RPI, O’Connor was also the director of the Radical Innovation Research Program, ongoing at the Lally School since 1995. In that role, she led a team of ten researchers across three universities in the program's second phase, a longitudinal research study designed to understand and improve large, established companies' implementation of radical innovation capabilities. She is responsible for recruiting twenty one Fortune 1000 companies to participate in this three-year effort, which is now complete and has resulted in the publication of a book, Grabbing Lightning: Building a Capability for Breakthrough Innovation (Jossey-Bass, 2008). The book was highlighted by Strategy + Business Magazine as the most influential book in Innovation in 2008.

Most recently, she led the next phase of the research, focusing on clarifying roles for innovation specialists. That resulted in the 2018 publication of the book Beyond the Champion: Institutionalizing Innovation Through People (Stanford University Press).

She has been recognized as one of the top 20 scholars in innovation management according to studies from 2007 and 2012. In 2014 she was recognized by the International Association for the Management of Technology (IAMOT) as one of the top scholars in Technology & Innovation Management, and was named a Crawford Fellow by the Product Development and Management Association (PDMA) in 2018. She and has been a speaker in many conferences, including the Innovation Roundtable

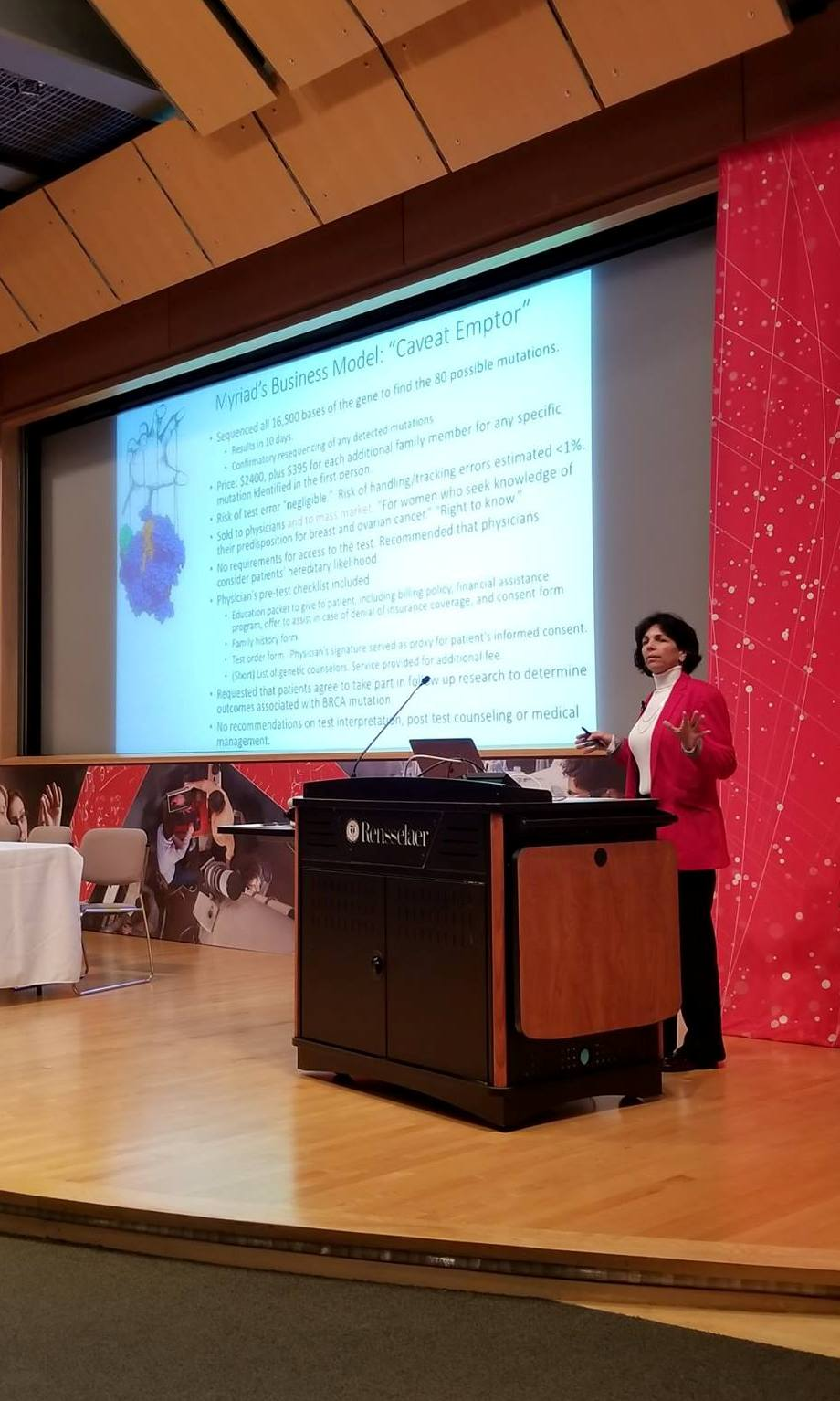
O’Connor hosting a panel on Ethics and Commercializing Advanced Technologies at Rensselaer Polytechnic Institute.

Before entering academia, O'Connor earned her Ph.D. in Marketing and Corporate Strategy at New York University. Prior to that time, she spent several years with McDonnell Douglas Corporation in Contract Administration on the AV-8B Harrier program, and at Monsanto Chemical Corporation's Department of Social Responsibility. She also holds an MBA and B.S. from Saint Louis University.

O'Connor's teaching and research interests lie at the intersection of corporate entrepreneurship and Breakthrough Innovation, Marketing, and Commercialization of Advanced Technologies. The majority of her research efforts focus on how firms create management systems to develop and sustain capabilities for Breakthrough Innovation and how innovators link advanced technology development to market opportunities.

She has published more than 90 articles in refereed journals including The Journal of Product Innovation Management, Organization Science, MIT's Sloan Management Review, California Management Review, Academy of Management Executive, and The Journal of Marketing among others, and is co-author of 3 books on Breakthrough Innovation in Large Mature companies e.g. Radical Innovation, How Mature Firms Can Outsmart Upstarts.

She won the RPI Alumni Teaching Award in 2006, and additional teaching and research awards at Babson College. A number of her published papers have won best paper of the year award in various scholarly journals. O'Connor has consulted with many companies to help them develop capabilities for commercializing technology based on breakthrough innovations (BIs) and to develop management systems for evolving a BI capability.

== Books ==
- O'Connor, Gina Colarelli; Corbett, Andrew; Peters, Lois (2018). Beyond the Champion: Institutionalizing Innovation Through People. Stanford University Press. ISBN 9780804798273.e
- O'Connor, Gina; Leifer, Richard; Paulson, Albert; Peters, Lois (2008). Grabbing Lightning: Building a Capability for Breakthrough Innovation. San Francisco: Jossey-Bass. ISBN 978-0-787-99664-2.
- Leifer, Richard; McDermott, Christopher; O'Connor, Gina; Rice, Mark; Veryzer, Robert (2000). Radical Innovation, How Mature Firms Can Outsmart Upstarts. Boston: Harvard Business School Press. ISBN 0-875-84903-2.
