= Laura K. Boyer =

American academic

Laura Kate Boyer is a clinical assistant professor at the Science and Technology Studies Department at Rensselaer Polytechnic Institute.

== Background ==
In 1991, Boyer received her BA (Cum Laude) in Geography and Psychology at Macalester College in Saint Paul, Minnesota. She received her MA in Human Geography at the University of British Columbia in 1994. In 2001, Boyer received her PhD in Human Geography at McGill University. In 2014 she became a lecturer in Human Geography in the School of Planning and Human Geography at Cardiff University.; As a professor, she specializes in urban studies, public policy, science and technology studies, as well as feminism and other social theories.

== Published works ==
- 1996 - Boyer, Laura K. What's a Girl Like You Doing in a Place Like This? A Geography of Sexual Violence in Early 20th Century Vancouver. Urban Geography, #4, pp. 286–293 (1996).
- 1998 - Boyer, Laura K. Place and the Politics of Virtue: Clerical Work, Corporate Anxiety, and Changing Meanings of Public Womanhood in Early Twentieth-Century Montreal. Gender, Place and Culture: A Journal of Feminist Geography, Vol. 5, #3 pp. 261–276 (1998).
- 2001 - Boyer, Laura K. and Lawrence, Catherine. Performance Management in the New World of Welfare. Quicker, Better, Cheaper?: Managing Performance in American Government, Ed. Dall Forsythe (Albany, NY) State University of New York Press, 2001.
- 2003 - Boyer, Laura K. At Work, At Home? New Geographies of Ethnicity, Gender, Work, and Care-Giving under Welfare Reform. Space and Polity, Vol. 7, #1, pp. 75–86 (2003).
- 2003 - Boyer, Laura K. 'Neither Forget Nor Remember Your Sex': Sexual Politics in the Early Twentieth-Century Canadian Office. The Journal of Historical Geography, Vol. 29, #3 (2003).
- 2004 - Boyer, Laura K. 'Miss Remington' Goes to Work: Gender, Space and Technology at the Dawn of the Information Age. The Professional Geographer (May 2004).
