= Martin A. Schmidt =

American university administrator (born 1960)

19th President of Rensselaer Polytechnic Institute
- Incumbent
- Assumed office July 1, 2022
- Preceded by: Shirley Ann Jackson

Personal details
- Born: January 30, 1960 (age 66)
- Scientific career
- Education: Rensselaer Polytechnic Institute (BS); Massachusetts Institute of Technology (PhD)
- Fields: Electrical engineering
- Institutions: Massachusetts Institute of Technology; Rensselaer Polytechnic Institute
- Thesis: Microsensors for the measurement of shear forces in turbulent boundary layers (1988)
- Doctoral advisor: Stephen D. Senturia

Martin Arnold Schmidt (born January 1960) is the 19th President of Rensselaer Polytechnic Institute. Prior to this role, Schmidt was provost at the Massachusetts Institute of Technology (MIT) from 2014 to 2022.

== Education ==
Schmidt earned his B.S. from Rensselaer Polytechnic Institute in 1981 and Ph.D. from MIT in 1988. His doctoral advisor was Stephen D. Senturia and his thesis was entitled "Microsensors for the measurement of shear forces in turbulent boundary layers".

== Career ==
In 1988, Schmidt became a faculty member of the MIT Electrical Engineering and Computer Science Department. From 1999 to 2006, He was the director of the Microsystems Technology Laboratories at MIT. In 2016, he was named the Ray and Maria Stata Professor at MIT. Schmidt became an associate provost at MIT from 2008 and assumed the role of provost in 2014.

He is a recipient of the National Science Foundation Presidential Young Investigator Award in 1991. He was named as a fellow of the Institute of Electrical and Electronics Engineers (IEEE) in 2004 for contributions to design and fabrication of microelectromechanical systems.

His teaching and research work is in the field of micro- and nanofabrication technologies for sensors, actuators, and MEMS. Schmidt has co-founded or co-invented the core technology of seven start-up companies.

Academic offices
Preceded by Shirley Ann Jackson	President of Rensselaer Polytechnic Institute; 2022–present	Incumbent
