= John H. Peck =

American academic

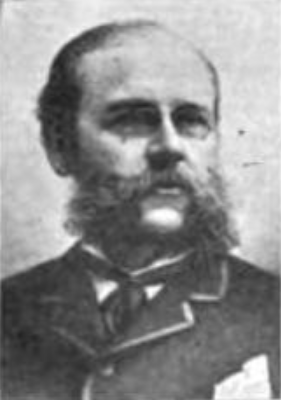
- Born: John Hudson Peck; February 7, 1838; Hudson, New York
- Died: May 5, 1919 (aged 81); Troy, New York
- Education: Hamilton College
- Occupation: Academic
- Spouse: Mercy P. Mann (m. 1883)

John Hudson Peck (February 7, 1838 – May 5, 1919) was the eighth president of Rensselaer Polytechnic Institute.

== Biography ==
He was born on February 7, 1838, in Hudson, New York. He was a descendant of William Peck, one of the original founders of the New Haven Colony. In 1859, he received a B.A. degree from Hamilton College. He later received M.A. and L.L.D degrees from Hamilton. He was admitted to the bar in New York State in 1861 and began to practice law in Troy, New York. In 1883, he married Mercy P. Mann. In the same year, he became a trustee of the Troy Female Seminary, which became the Emma Willard School. He was also a trustee of the Episcopal diocese of Albany. In 1888, he was appointed president of Rensselaer, and remained president for twelve years. He died at his home in Troy on May 5, 1919.

Academic offices
| Preceded by Albert E. Powers | President of Rensselaer Polytechnic Institute; 1888 – 1901 | Succeeded by Palmer C. Ricketts |
