= Gurley Precision Instruments =

- Company type: Private
- Industry: manufacturing
- Predecessor: Gurley Enterprise
- Founded: 1845
- Founder: William Gurley and Lewis E. Gurley
- Headquarters: Troy, New York

Gurley Precision Instruments, or GPI, is an ISO-9001 certified U.S. manufacturing company based in Troy, New York.

== History ==
Gurley Enterprise was established by William Gurley and Lewis E. Gurley in 1845, brothers who were both alumni of Rensselaer Polytechnic Institute. In 1885 Gurley started making Hydrologic equipment and in the early 1900s acquired many new fields including paper testing equipment and thermometers. During World War II Gurley won the Army-Navy ‘E’ Award for their contribution to the war effort. In the 1950s the company started producing optical encoders. During the Cold war era, Gurley manufactured gyroscopes, sextants, star trackers, theodolites, angle dividers, optical positioning systems, and various other precision guidance devices for guided missiles and for space launch vehicles. Teledyne Corporation acquired W. & L. E. Gurley in 1968. In 1993 Gurley was sold again and became Gurley Precision Instruments.

The W. & L. E. Gurley Building in Troy was named a National Historic Landmark in 1983.

== Units of measurement ==
GPI has been responsible for the creation of two commonly used units of measure. These units were so named due to the association with the devices used for their measurement.

=== Porosity ===
The Gurley second or Gurley unit is a unit that describes air permeability as a function of the time required for a specified amount of air to pass through a specified area of a separator under a specified pressure. Specifically, it is defined as the number of seconds required for 100 cubic centimeters (1 deciliter) of air to pass through 1.0 square inch of a given material at a pressure differential of 4.88 inches of water (0.176 psi)(ISO 5636-5:2003).

=== Stiffness ===
The Gurley unit is a measure of the stiffness of a material. Since the measurement device holds a piece of material vertically and tests the force required to deflect the material a given amount. One Gurley unit is equivalent to one milligram of force , however the Gurley unit also implies measurement with this apparatus. A related unit, the Taber, is highly correlated but uses a different apparatus (manufactured by Taber Industries) for performing measurements.
