= William Gurley =

American academic (1821–1887)

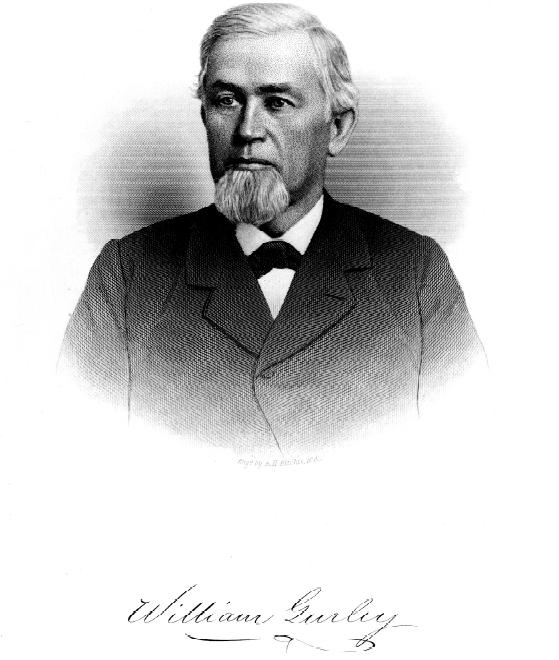

William Gurley (March 16, 1821 – January 11, 1887) co-founded what is now known as Gurley Precision Instruments with his brother, and served as vice president and, from 1886 to 1887, acting president of Rensselaer Polytechnic Institute.

Gurley was born in Troy, New York, March 16, 1821, the son of Ephraim and Clarissa (Sharp) Gurley. He received the best education afforded by the schools in this vicinity, and choosing the profession of a civil engineer, attended the Rensselaer Polytechnic Institute, from which he graduated in 1839. He worked as a surveyor for a few years and then joined the firm of Oscar Hanks, who was a well-known maker of surveying instruments and church bells in Troy. He worked for Hanks for five years.

In 1845, Gurley established his own scientific instrument manufacturing business in partnership with James Phelps. Phelps had had his own shop since 1838. They called the business Phelps & Gurley. In 1844, William Gurley's brother Lewis Ephraim Gurley joined Phelps' shop as an apprentice and he then attended Union College from 1847 to 1851. Lewis Gurley rejoined the firm in 1851, at which point it was renamed Phelps and Gurleys. In 1852, Phelps sold out his interest and the business was renamed W.& L.E. Gurley. The firm still exists today as Gurley Precision Instruments. William Gurley was involved in several local organizations. For many years he was connected with the YMCA, and in 1851 was elected its president. He served as alderman from 1860 to 1864, and as fire commissioner he helped to improve fire prevention systems in major cities. He was a member of the New York State Assembly (Rensselaer Co., 1st D.) in 1867. In 1868, he was appointed by the Secretary of the Treasury to serve on a commission with Prof. Joseph Henry and other scientific experts to examine the best meter devised for determining the products of distillation, to be subsequently adopted by the department.

Gurley was a long-time trustee of Rensselaer, having been elected to that position in 1855. He was secretary of the institution from 1861 to 1872, vice-president from 1872 to 1887 and acting president from 1886 to 1887. He died on January 11, 1887, in Troy.

The W. & L. E. Gurley Building in Troy was designated a National Historic Landmark in 1983.

Academic offices
Preceded by James Forsyth	President of Rensselaer Polytechnic Institute; 1886–1887	Succeeded by Albert E. Powers
