= R. Byron Pipes =

American academic administrator

Robert Byron Pipes (born 1941) is an educator, researcher in polymer sciences and was the seventeenth president of Rensselaer Polytechnic Institute.

He was born on August 14, 1941, in Shreveport, Louisiana. He and his wife Ruth Ellen (whom he married on June 27, 1964) had two children: Christopher and Mark.

He received a B.S. in civil engineering from Louisiana Polytechnic Institute in 1964, an M.S. in engineering from Princeton University in 1969 and a Ph.D. in mechanical engineering from the University of Texas at Arlington in 1972. From 1972 to 1974, he was an assistant professor in mechanical engineering at Drexel University. In 1974, he joined the University of Delaware as associate professor of mechanical and aerospace engineering, rising to professor of mechanical engineering in 1980, dean of the College of Engineering in 1985 and provost and vice-president for academic affairs in 1991. From 1978 to 1985, he was director of the Center for Composite Materials at the University of Delaware and from 1989 to 1993, he was Robert L. Spencer Professor of Engineering. In 1993, he was elected president of Rensselaer Polytechnic Institute. However, he had a difficult relationship with the faculty, which felt that it did not have a voice in how faculty and administrator openings were filled. The faculty senate decided on April 1, 1998, to hold a faculty-wide no-confidence vote. The following day, he announced that he was resigning effective July 1, 1998.

From 1998 to 2001, he was a distinguished visiting scientist at the College of William and Mary. During this time, he conducted research on carbon nanotechnology at the NASA Langley Research Center. In 2001, he joined the University of Akron as the Goodyear Professor of Polymer Engineering and director of the Akron Global Polymer Academy. In 2004, he was appointed the John L. Bray Distinguished Professor of Engineering at Purdue University.

== Honors and awards ==
In 1987, Pipes was elected a member of the National Academy of Engineering for interdisciplinary leadership in composite materials research, and for development of an exemplary model of university, industrial, and governmental interactions in research and education. In 1993, he became a member of the Swedish Royal Academy of Engineering. He received the Outstanding Research Award from the American Society of Composites in 1994. He is a fellow of the American Society of Mechanical Engineers and the Society for Advanced Materials and Process Engineering. In 1983, he received the Gustus L. Larson Memorial Award from Pi Tau Sigma and the ASME.

== Books ==
- Adams, Donald F, Carlsson, Leif A. and Pipes, R. Byron, (2002) Experimental Characterization of Advanced Composite Materials, Third Edition, CRC. ISBN 978-1-58716-100-1
- Whitney, James M., Daniel, Isaac M. and Pipes, R. Byron, (1984) Experimental Mechanics of Fiber Reinforced Composite Materials, The Society for Experimental Mechanics, ISBN 978-0-912053-01-1
- Dhingra, Aslok K. and Pipes, R. Byron (1982) New Composite Materials and Technology, American Institute of Chemical Engineers, ISBN 978-0-8169-0234-7
- Zweben, Carl H., Kulkarni, Satish V. and Pipes, R. Byron, (1978) Composite Materials in the Automobile Industry, American Society of Mechanical Engineers.

Academic offices
Preceded by Roland W. Schmitt	President of Rensselaer Polytechnic Institute; 1993–1998	Succeeded by Cornelius J. Barton
