= Ned Herrmann =

American creativity researcher and author

William Edward Herrmann (1922 – December 24, 1999) was an American creativity researcher and author, known for his research in creative thinking and whole-brain methods. He is considered the "father of brain dominance technology".

== Biography ==
At Cornell University, Herrmann majored in both physics and music in the Class of 1943. He continued to study at the Graduate Studies R.P.I., New York University.

After graduation Hermann became manager of Management Education for General Electric (GE) in 1970. His primary responsibility was to oversee training program design; specifically, maintaining or increasing an individual's productivity, motivation, and creativity.

In 1978, Herrmann created the "Herrmann Participant Survey Form". He profiled workshop participants' thinking styles and learning preferences in accord with brain dominance theory. This quickly evolved into a theory of stable brain quadrants, independent of brain anatomy facts, each with its own characteristic "genius". He developed the Herrmann Brain Dominance Instrument (HBDI), the scored and analyzed Participant Survey, and designed the Applied Creative Thinking Workshop (ACT), which remains a leading personality assessment instrument and workshop topic in corporate training.

Herrmann's contributions brought him worldwide recognition. In 1992, he received the Distinguished Contribution to Human Resource Development Award from the American Society for Training & Development (ASTD). In 1993, he was elected President of The American Creativity Association.

== Work ==
Herrmann was a pioneer in exploring, explicating and expanding understanding of the brain in close-up view as a four quadrant system. He was one of the first to ascertain, through testing, how individuals use or prefer one, two, three or all four possible brain quadrants. His approach to brain balance was to encourage experiments, use and exercise of weaker quadrants through live, in-person games, small group processes and discussion. This evolved into more and better ideas about whole-brainedness.

He spent 30 years from approximately 1964–1996, exploring and explicating Herrmann Brain Dominance Instrument to teaching, learning, increased self-understanding and enhanced creative thinking capabilities, on both an individual and corporate level.

== Selected publications ==
Books:

- Herrmann, Ned. The whole brain business book. Vol. 334. New York: McGraw-Hill, 1996.
- Herrmann, Ned. The Creative Brain, First Edition, Lake Lure, N.C.: Brain Books, 1988.

Articles, a selection:

- Herrmann, Ned. "The Creative Brain". Training and Development Journal 35.10 (1981): 10–16.
- Herrmann, Ned. "The Creative Brain*". The Journal of Creative Behavior 25.4 (1991): 275–295.
- Herrmann, Ned. "What is the function of the various brainwaves?" Scientific American 22.12 (1997)
