= Daniel Berg (educator) =

American academic (born 1929)

President of Rensselaer Polytechnic Institute
- In office 1985–1987
- Preceded by: George Low
- Succeeded by: Stanley I. Landgraf

Personal details
- Born: June 1, 1929 (age 97) New York City, New York, U.S.
- Education: City College of New York (B.S.); Yale University (M.S., Ph.D.)
- Occupation: Educator; scientist
- Awards: Wilbur Cross Medal

Daniel Berg (born June 1, 1929) is a educator, scientist and was the fifteenth president of Rensselaer Polytechnic Institute.

== Education ==
Daniel Berg was born on June 1, 1929, in New York City. In 1946, he graduated from Stuyvesant High School and in 1950 graduated from City College of New York with a B.S. in physics and chemistry. He earned M.S. and Ph. D. degrees in physical chemistry from Yale University in 1951 and 1953 respectively.

== Career ==
From 1953 to 1977, he worked at the Westinghouse Electric Corporation, ultimately as technical director. In 1977, he joined Carnegie Mellon University as dean of the Mellon College of Science. In 1981, he became co-provost, along with Richard L. Van Horn.

In 1983, he was appointed vice president of academic affairs and provost of Rensselaer Polytechnic Institute. In 1984, he was named acting president on the death of the previous president, George Low, and became president of Rensselaer in 1985. He served as president until 1987, and he stayed on at RPI as the Institute Professor of Science and Technology. His research interests include "understanding the relationship of technology and the service sector," as well as "management of technological organization, innovation, policy, manufacturing strategy, robotics, policy issues of research and development in the service sector."

In 1947, he received the Belden Medal for mathematics as an undergraduate at City College of New York. In 1983, he received the Wilbur Cross Medal from the Association of Yale Alumni, awarded to Yale graduate school alumni who have "distinguished achievements in scholarship, teaching, academic administration, and public service."

Berg was elected a member of the National Academy of Engineering in 1976 for contributions to the art and science of electrical insulation and in the motivation of young engineers in technological innovations. He is also a fellow of the Institute for Operations Research and the Management Sciences, the Institute of Electrical and Electronics Engineers, the New York Academy of Sciences and the American Association for the Advancement of Science.

In 2007, he received the Engineering Management Educator of the Year award from the IEEE Engineering Management Society. The award recognizes "outstanding education or education administration contributions to the field of engineering management or a closely related discipline".

== Daniel Berg Lifetime Achievement Medal and Honorary Doctorate ==
In 2017, the International Academy of Information Technology and Quantitative Management named the Daniel Berg Lifetime Achievement Medal in his honor. The award honors "an individual who has made significant contributions to technology innovation, service systems and strategic decision-making".

Daniel Berg is to receive an honorary doctorate from his alma mater, the City College of New York, at its Commencement ceremony on May 29, 2026.

Academic offices
Preceded by George Low	President of Rensselaer Polytechnic Institute; 1984 – 1987	Succeeded by Stanley I. Landgraf
