= Palmer C. Ricketts =

American university president (1856–1934)

Palmer Chamberlain Ricketts

9th President of Rensselaer Polytechnic Institute
- In office 1901–1934
- Preceded by: John H. Peck
- Succeeded by: William O. Hotchkiss

Personal details
- Born: January 17, 1856 Elkton, Maryland, U.S.
- Died: December 9, 1934 (aged 78) Troy, New York, U.S.
- Spouse: Vjera Renshaw (m. 1902)
- Relatives: Louis Davidson Ricketts (brother)
- Education: Rensselaer Polytechnic Institute (CE, 1875)
- Profession: Civil engineer, academic administrator
- Awards: Honorary Member, American Society of Civil Engineers; Honorary Member, American Society of Mechanical Engineers (1931); American Philosophical Society (1914); RPI Alumni Hall of Fame (1998)

Palmer Chamberlain Ricketts (January 17, 1856 – December 9, 1934) was the ninth president of Rensselaer Polytechnic Institute. He served as president for 33 years and oversaw a period of major expansion and development of the university.

== Personal life ==
Palmer C. Ricketts was born in Elkton, Maryland, on January 17, 1856, and was educated privately at Princeton, New Jersey. His father, also named Palmer Chamberlain Ricketts, was the founder of the local newspaper, the Cecil Whig. His brother, Louis Davidson Ricketts, achieved prominence as a mining engineer and in finance in Arizona. He was married in 1902 to Vjera Renshaw of Baltimore.

== Rensselaer Polytechnic Institute ==
Ricketts first arrived at RPI in 1871, at only fifteen years of age, where he joined the Alpha chapter of Theta Xi fraternity as their 84th brother. He was an average student and participated in few campus activities, the exception being his membership on the editorial board of the 1874 edition of the Transit, the school yearbook. His graduating thesis was titled, "Review of the Substructure of the Wrought Iron Girder Bridge over the Hudson River at Troy."

Immediately following his graduation in 1875, Ricketts was appointed as Assistant in Mathematics and Astronomy at RPI. Ricketts was promoted to Assistant Professor in 1882 and in 1884 became the William H. Hart Professor of Rational & Technical Mechanics, the first endowed chair at the Institute. He was described in the campus newspaper, The Rensselaer Polytechnic, as "one of the most popular instructors in the Institute, a man whom we have honored for years, and whom we expect to see bringing great credit to his Alma Mater in his present position."

In 1892, he was appointed director of the Institute, a position that put him in charge of the faculty. During this time, he expanded the curriculum by adding an electrical engineering program. He also worked to improve recognition and support of the Institute through various publicity efforts, such as a display of alumni work at the 1893 Columbian Exposition in Chicago.

He was elected president in 1901 by unanimous consent of the board of trustees, replacing John H. Peck after his resignation. During his administration he pushed for major expansion of the student body and campus; under his tenure, ten major academic buildings and twenty-nine dormitory units were constructed, now commonly referred to as the "green roof campus" due to the easily recognizable brick Colonial Revival architecture and copper roofs. Ricketts further expanded the Institute's curriculum, adding degree programs in mechanical, chemical, metallurgical, aeronautical and industrial engineering as well as a school of architecture in 1929. To fund these developments, Ricketts successfully solicited money from various groups and individuals, most notably a $1 million gift from Margaret Olivia Sage in 1906. Another large contribution of $5 million over several years came from John M. Lockhart, a member of the class of 1887, who was a Pittsburgh steel maker, financier and a son of a founder of Standard Oil. Lockhart was only discovered to be the contributor after his death, having given his money using the pseudonym "Builder." Overall, he presided over the growth of Rensselaer's resources from less than $500,000 to more than $11 million. Enrollment increased from around 200 to 1,900, and the number of faculty increased correspondingly. Ricketts organized the Institute's 100th Anniversary celebration, which was attended by dignitaries from around the world. He wrote the first three editions of History of the Rensselaer Polytechnic Institute; the first edition of was published in 1895, the second in 1914, and the third in 1934.

In 1933, he began the construction of a building for the aeronautical, chemical and metallurgical engineering departments, but did not live to see its completion in 1935, as he died in office on December 9, 1934. It was named the Ricketts Building in his honor. He was inducted into RPI's Alumni Hall of Fame in 1998.

== Career ==
Palmer C. Ricketts served as an assistant engineer for the Troy and Boston Railroad Company during the summers of 1876 and 1877, and was later elected an honorary member of the American Society of Civil Engineers and the American Society of Mechanical Engineers (1931). From 1891 to 1892, he served as chief engineer for the Troy Public Improvement Commission, helping the city design new water and sewage systems. In 1897 and 1898, Ricketts was a consulting engineer for flood control for the River Commission of Corning, New York. He was elected to the American Philosophical Society in 1914.

Ricketts and his wife were both active in local affairs, and Ricketts himself served as director of the Troy Chamber of Commerce from 1900 to 1902. In 1933, just one year before he would die in office, he was honored as "the most outstanding citizen of Troy."

Academic offices
Preceded by John H. Peck	President of Rensselaer Polytechnic Institute; 1901 – 1934	Succeeded by William O. Hotchkiss
