= Albert E. Powers =

American academic

Albert Ebenezer Powers (December 5, 1816 – June 17, 1910) was the acting president of Rensselaer Polytechnic Institute from 1887-88. He was born in Lansingburgh, New York. He entered Rensselaer as a student in 1834, but stayed for only four months. He married Frances Elizabeth Hanford in 1839, but she died in 1850. In 1841, he joined a business that was started by his father manufacturing oil cloth. In 1857, he married his second wife, Lucy Clark Allen. In 1861, he was appointed a trustee of Rensselaer and served as acting president in 1887-1888.

Academic offices
Preceded by William Gurley	President of Rensselaer Polytechnic Institute; 1887 – 1888	Succeeded by John H. Peck
