= George Low =

American NASA administrator

George M. Low
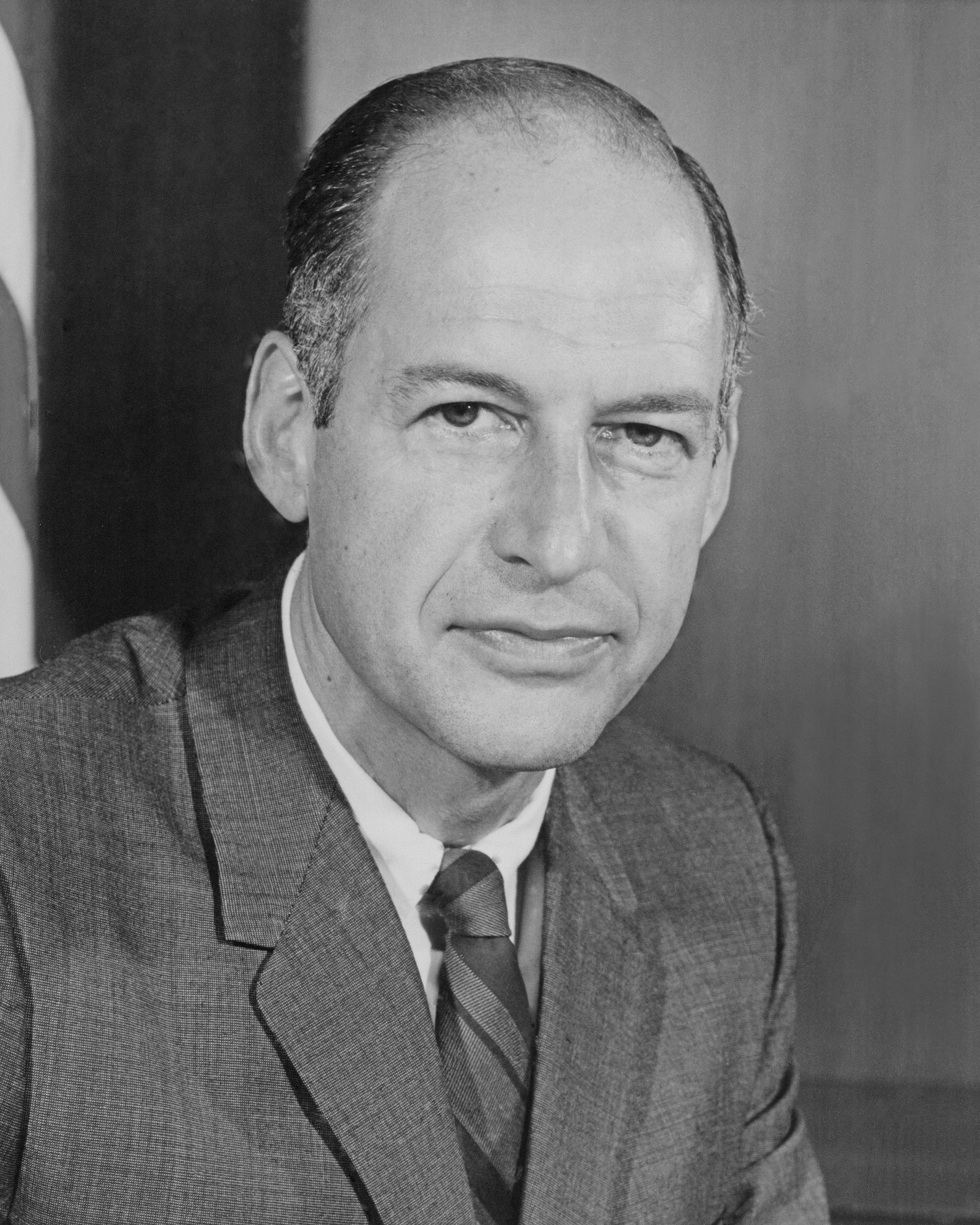
- George M. Low

4th Deputy Administrator of the National Aeronautics and Space Administration
- In office December 3, 1969 – June 5, 1976
- President: Richard Nixon; Gerald Ford
- Administrator: Thomas O. Paine (1969–1970); Himself (acting, 1970–1971); James C. Fletcher (1971–1976)
- Preceded by: Thomas O. Paine
- Succeeded by: Alan M. Lovelace

14th President of Rensselaer Polytechnic Institute
- In office Spring 1976 – July 17, 1984
- Preceded by: Richard J. Grosh
- Succeeded by: Daniel Berg

Personal details
- Born: June 10, 1926 Vienna, Austria
- Died: July 17, 1984 (aged 58)
- Education: Rensselaer Polytechnic Institute (BS, MS)

George Michael Low (born Georg Michael Löw; June 10, 1926 – July 17, 1984) was an administrator at NASA and the 14th president of the Rensselaer Polytechnic Institute. Low was one of the senior NASA officials who made decisions as manager of the Apollo Spacecraft Program Office in the Apollo program of crewed missions to the Moon.

== Early life and education ==
Low was born near Vienna, Austria, to Artur and Gertrude Löw (née Burger), who had a prosperous manufacturing business, and was educated in private schools in Switzerland and England. His father died in 1934. When Nazi Germany occupied Austria in 1938, Low's family—being Jewish—emigrated to the United States. In 1943, Low graduated from Forest Hills High School in Forest Hills, New York, and entered Rensselaer Polytechnic Institute (RPI), where he joined the Delta Phi fraternity. His college education was interrupted by the Second World War and from 1944 to 1946, he served in the United States Army. During his military service, he became a naturalized American citizen and legally changed his name to George Michael Low.

After military service, Low returned to RPI and received his Bachelor of Science degree in aeronautical engineering in 1948. He then worked at Convair in Fort Worth, Texas, as a mathematician in an aerodynamics group. Low returned to RPI late in 1948 and received his Master of Science degree in aeronautical engineering in 1950.

== NACA and NASA career ==
=== At Lewis Flight Propulsion Laboratory ===
After completing his M.S. degree, Low joined the National Advisory Committee for Aeronautics (NACA) as an engineer at the Lewis Flight Propulsion Laboratory in Cleveland, Ohio, (later the Lewis Research Center and now the Glenn Research Center). He worked as the head of the Fluid Mechanics Section (1954–1956) and chief of the Special Projects Branch (1956–1958). Low specialized in experimental and theoretical research in the fields of heat transfer, boundary layer flows, and internal aerodynamics. In addition, he worked on such space technology problems as orbit calculations, reentry paths, and space rendezvous techniques.

=== NASA Goett Committee ===
During the summer and autumn of 1958, preceding the formation of the National Aeronautics and Space Administration (NASA), Low worked on a planning team to organize the new aerospace agency. Soon after NASA's formal organization in October 1958, Low transferred to the agency's headquarters in Washington, D.C., where he served as Chief of Manned Space Flight. In this capacity, he was closely involved in the planning of Projects Mercury, Gemini, and Apollo. Low played a critical role in advocating for a lunar landing as NASA's long-term goal. He testified before Congress, spoke to the media, and presented at industry conferences on behalf of NASA. Low also formed the Low Committee in 1960, which produced a lunar landing feasibility study that played a role in John F. Kennedy's decision to set a goal of landing humans on the Moon by the end of the 1960s.

=== Houston and the Apollo Spacecraft Program Office ===
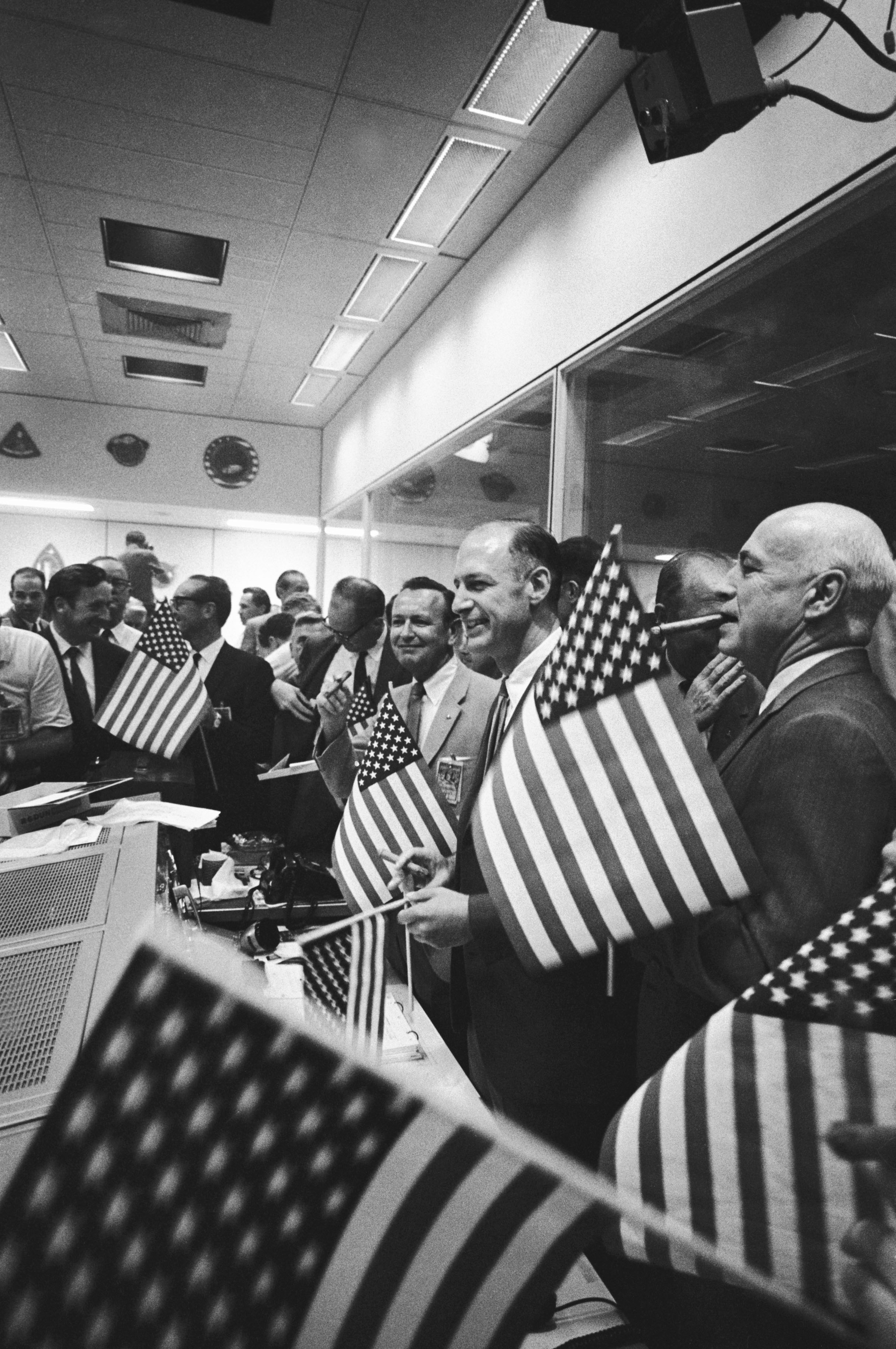
Low and other NASA officials and flight controllers celebrating the successful conclusion of the Apollo 11 lunar landing mission.

In February 1964, Low transferred to NASA's Manned Spacecraft Center in Houston, Texas, (now the Johnson Space Center) and served as Deputy Center Director. In April 1967, following the Apollo 1 fire, he was named manager of the Apollo Spacecraft Program Office (ASPO), where he was responsible for directing the changes to the Apollo spacecraft necessary to make it flightworthy. In this role he led the use of FMEA, or failure mode and effects analysis, to rigorously define the possible risks in human space flight. Low also created and chaired the Configuration Control Board, which had as its purpose to monitor technical changes that could inadvertently affect some other part of the complex Apollo system, thereby helping assure future mission safety. Flight Director Glynn Lunney praised Low's leadership, and his contributions helped return the Apollo project schedule to the promised date for the Moon landing.

=== NASA deputy administrator ===
George Low became NASA deputy administrator in December 1969, serving with Administrators Thomas O. Paine and James C. Fletcher. He served as acting administrator after Paine's resignation. In these roles, Low played a significant part in the development of the Space Shuttle program, the Skylab program, and the Apollo–Soyuz Test Project.

Rocket engineer Wernher von Braun blamed Low for what he felt was shabby treatment in the early 1970s while he was at NASA Headquarters. According to Bob Ward's 2005 biography, von Braun believed Low was jealous of his fame and that Low helped force von Braun's unhappy departure from the space agency. However, another biography by space historian Michael J. Neufeld disputed Low's involvement in von Braun's resignation. Low's biography by Richard Jurek also disputes this account, indicating Low's efforts to try to retain and engage von Braun in strategic planning in the early 1970s and being pleased with von Braun's work.

== President of Rensselaer Polytechnic Institute ==
Retiring from NASA in 1976, Low became president of RPI. He held that position until his death in 1984. He initiated the Rensselaer Technology Park. The New York State Center for Industrial Innovation was renamed the George M. Low Center for Industrial Innovation by RPI shortly after his death.

== Personal life ==
In 1949, Low married Mary Ruth McNamara of Troy, New York. Between 1952 and 1963, they had five children: Mark S., Diane E., George David, John M., and Nancy A. His son David became an astronaut for NASA in 1985, flew three times on the Space Shuttle, and died in 2008.

On April 8, 1985, the White House announced that Low had been awarded the Presidential Medal of Freedom for his contributions to the fields of education and science.

== In popular culture ==
In the 1996 TV movie, Apollo 11 Low was played by Dennis Lipscomb. In the 1998 miniseries From the Earth to the Moon he was played by Holmes Osborne.

Academic offices
Preceded by Richard J. Grosh	President of Rensselaer Polytechnic Institute; 1976–1984	Succeeded by Daniel Berg
