= Roland W. Schmitt =

American academic administrator (1923–2017)

Roland Walter Schmitt

16th President of Rensselaer Polytechnic Institute
- In office 1988–1993

Personal details
- Born: July 24, 1923 Seguin, Texas, United States
- Died: March 31, 2017 (aged 93)
- Spouse(s): Alice V. Calhoun (m. 1951–1956; her death), Claire F. Kunz (m. 1957–)
- Children: 4
- Occupation: Physicist, business executive, academic administrator

Roland Walter Schmitt (July 24, 1923 – March 31, 2017) was an American physicist, business executive and the sixteenth president of Rensselaer Polytechnic Institute. He specialized in the physics of metals, and their temperature effects.

== Early life and education ==
Roland Walter Schmitt was born on July 24, 1923, in Seguin, Texas, to Walter L. Schmitt and Myrtle F. (Caldwell) Schmitt.

He graduated from the University of Texas with a B.S. degree in physics and a B.A. degree in mathematics, both in 1947 and a master's degree in physics in 1948. He received a P.h.D. in physics from Rice University in 1951.

During World War II, Schmitt served in the United States Air Force.

On June 2, 1951, he married Alice V. Calhoun (b. February 12, 1930) and they had two sons. Alice died on July 17, 1956. He later married Claire F. Kunz (b. July 11, 1928 d. July 11, 2017) on September 19, 1957; they had two children.

== Career ==
He then joined General Electric in 1951, as a research associate and remained with the company until his retirement in 1988. From 1978 to 1986, he directed the General Electric Research and Development Center in Schenectady, New York. In 1982, he was appointed senior vice president.

In 1979, Schmitt was appointed to the energy research advisory board (ERAB) for the United States Department of Energy.

From 1988 to 1993, he was president of Rensselaer Polytechnic Institute. During his tenure, he oversaw a $200 million fundraising campaign and saw the addition of new degree programs and research centers.

He served as a member of the National Science Board, succeeding chemist Lloyd Miller Cooke from 1982 to 1994; and as chairman from 1984 to 1988. In January 2000, he was appointed by New York State Governor George Pataki as chairman of the board of the New York State Office of Science, Technology and Academic Research (NYSTAR).

In 1978, he was elected to the National Academy of Engineering, and received the Arthur M. Bueche Award from the NAE in 1995. He was a member of the Institute of Electrical and Electronics Engineers, the 1989 recipient of the IEEE Engineering Leadership Recognition Award, the 1988 recipient of the Maurice Holland Award and 1989 recipient of the IRI Medal, both from the Industrial Research Institute, and the 1992 recipient of the IEEE Founders Medal. He was a fellow of the American Academy of Arts and Sciences, the American Physical Society and the American Association for the Advancement of Science.

From 1993 to 1998, Schmitt was the Chair of the Governing Board of the American Institute of Physics.

Schmitt died in March 2017, aged 93, in Scotia.

Academic offices
Preceded by Stanley I. Landgraf	President of Rensselaer Polytechnic Institute; 1988 – 1993	Succeeded by R. Byron Pipes
