= Massood Tabib-Azar =

Academic background
- Education: M.S., Electrical Engineering; Ph.D., Electrical Engineering
- Alma mater: Rensselaer Polytechnic Institute
- Thesis: Evaluation of electrical properties of semiconductor surfaces and interfaces (1988)

Academic work
- Institutions: University of Utah

Massood Tabib-Azar is an Iranian-American electrical engineer, researcher and academic. He is a USTAR Professor of Electrical Engineering in the University of Utah and an Editor of IEEE Electron Device Letters.

Tabib-Azar's research has been focused on near-field electromagnetic imaging, microactuators, sensors, nano-ionics and nano-electronics, bio-interfaces, biomedical devices and nano-electromechanical systems. He is the author of three books and more than 250 journal publications. He holds 9 patents.

== Education ==
Tabib-Azar received an M.S. in Electrical Engineering in 1985 and a Ph.D. in Electrical Engineering in 1986, both from Rensselaer Polytechnic Institute. His Ph.D. thesis was entitled Evaluation of Electrical Properties of Semiconductor Surfaces and Interfaces.

== Career ==
Tabib-Azar joined Rensselaer Polytechnic Institute as an instructor in 1986. He left Rensselaer Polytechnic Institute and joined Case Western Reserve University as an assistant professor, becoming associate professor in 1992 and Full Professor in 2001. At Case Western, he was the associate director of Polymer Molecular Devices from 2002 to 2004. Tabib-Azar left Case Western Reserve University in 2009 and joined University of Utah as USTAR Professor of Electrical and Computer Engineering.

In 1997, he joined Manufacturing Instrumentation Consultant Company as its president and served there until 2009. He was the co-chair of NSF Brain Initiative Workshop in 2014. From 2012 to 2013, he was a Program Director at the National Science Foundation and contributed to the Foundation's BRAIN Initiative.

From 2005 to 2010, Tabib-Azar served on the editorial board of International Journal of Opto-Mechatronics. In 2013, he was appointed as an editor of IEEE Electron Device Letters. He was the Guest Editor of the special issue on Recent Advances in Devices for Human Brain Imaging of Micromachines, and of the special issue on Micro-Plasma Devices of Micromachines.

=== Research and work ===
Tabib-Azar has advanced the near-field electromagnetic imaging systems to acquire images of the electromagnetic properties of materials with an unprecedented spatial resolution of one million times better than the far-field techniques. He introduced and developed for the first time an optically controlled micro-electromechanical device in early 1990s, quantum neural networks in late 1990s, non-volatile resistive memory devices based on silver and copper halides and chalcogenides in early 2000 and invented the micro-plasma field-effect transistors (MOPFETS), and zero-power, colorimetric Zika virus sensors among many other devices in 2010s.

Tabib-Azar's current research interests include nanometrology, molecular electronics, novel devices based on solid electrolytes, sensors and actuators, classical and quantum machine learning and quantum computing.

== Awards and honors ==
- 1991-1992 - Lilly Teaching Fellowship
- 1995 - Ohio Aerospace Institute Plaque of Collaborative Research Recognition
- 2004 - The Hyper Human Tech Award, IEEE/RSJ Inter. Conf. on Intelligent Robots and Systems
- 2007 - Dean's Fellow of Collegiality

== Publications ==
=== Books ===
- Integrated Optics and Microstructure Sensors (1995)
- Micro-Actuators (1998)
- Evanescent Microwave Microscopy for High-Speed and High-Resolution Material Characterizations (2001)
- Hyperspectral Characterization of Dentin and Related Materials (2003)

=== Selected papers ===
- Sutapun, M. Tabib-Azar, and A. Kazemi, “Pd-Coated Elastooptic Fiber Optic Bragg Sensors for Multiplexed Hydrogen Sensing.” Sensors and Actuators B Vol. 56, pp. 305–313 (1999).
- M. Tabib-Azar, B. Sutapun, R. Petrick, and A. Kazemi, “Highly Sensitive Hydrogen Sensors Using Palladium Coated Fiber Optics with Exposed Cores and Evanescent Field Interactions.” Sensors and Actuators B Vol. 56, p. 158-163 (1999).
- Massood Tabib-Azar, Maissarath Nassirou, Run Wang, S. Sharma, T. I. Kamins, M. Saif Islam, and R. Stanley Williams, “Mechanical properties of self-welded silicon nanobridges.” Applied Physics Letters Vol. 87, 113102 (2005).
- M. Tabib-Azar, D.-P. Su, A. Pohar, S. R. LeClair, and G. Ponchak, “0.4 μm Spatial Resolution With 1 GHz (30 cm) Evanescent Microwave Probe.” Review of Scientific Instruments, Vol. 70 (3), pp. 1725–1729 (1999).
- M. Tabib-Azar, P. S. Pathak, G. Ponchak, S. R. LeClair, “Nondestructive Superresolution Imaging of Defects and Nonuniformities in Metals, Semiconductors, Dielectrics, Composites, and Plants Using Evanescent Microwaves.” Review of Scientific Instruments, Vol. 70 (6), pp. 2783–2792 (1999).
- Massood Tabib-Azar; Yaqiang Wang, “Design and fabrication of scanning near-field microwave probes compatible with atomic force microscopy to image embedded nanostructures.” IEEE Transactions on Microwave Theory and Techniques v 52 n 3, p. 971-9 (2004).
