= E. Bruce Nauman =

American chemical engineer

E. Bruce Nauman (1937–2009) was a professor of chemical engineering at Rensselaer Polytechnic Institute in Troy, New York.

He obtained his B.S. degree in nuclear engineering from Kansas State University in Manhattan, a M.S. degree in chemical engineering from the University of Tennessee in Knoxville, and a Ph.D. degree in chemical engineering from the University of Leeds in Leeds, England. He joined RPI in 1981 as the chair of the department of chemical engineering, after a career in research and development with Xerox and Union Carbide. During the course of his tenure he oversaw thirty-two doctoral students. He died of lung cancer on May 24, 2009, after a long illness.

== Honors ==
- Fellow, American Institute of Chemical Engineers
- Associate editor, The Chemical Engineering Journal, Transactions of the Institute of Chemical Engineers, and Butterworth Series in Chemical Engineering
- Board member and past president, North American Mixing Forum of the AIChE
- Member, Princeton University Advisory Council, 1980 to 1984
- External examiner, University of Technology, Jamaica, 2002 to 2007
- Member, United States Military Academy Advisory Council, 2006 - 2009
- Winner of the NAMF Award of the American Institute of Chemical Engineers

== Publications ==
Dr. Nauman has over 150 publications in archival literature, six patents, 14 book chapters, including several chapters in Encyclopedia of Polymer Science and Engineering, and 24 miscellaneous publications. He is also the author of four books:

- Nauman, E. B., Chemical Reactor Design, Optimization and Scaleup, McGraw-Hill, New York, 2002
- Nauman, E. B., Introductory Systems Analysis for Process Engineers, Butterworths, Boston, 1990
- Nauman, E. B., Chemical Reactor Design, Wiley, New York, 1987
- Nauman, E. B., and Buffham, B.A., Mixing in Continuous Flow Systems, Wiley, New York, 1983
