= Herrmann brain dominance instrument =

Type of cognitive style measurement and model

The Herrmann brain dominance instrument (HBDI) is a system to measure and describe thinking preferences in people, developed by William "Ned" Herrmann while leading management education at General Electric's Crotonville facility. It is a type of cognitive style measurement and model. It is often compared to psychological assessments such as various Big 5 Personality Traits assessments, Emotional Intelligence Measures, Myers-Briggs Type Indicator, Learning Orientation Questionnaire, DISC assessment, and others.

== Brain dominance model ==
In his brain dominance model, Herrmann identifies four different modes of thinking:

- A. Analytical thinking

Key words: logical, factual, critical, technical, quantitative.
Preferred activities: collecting data, analysis, understanding how things work, judging ideas based on facts, criteria and logical reasoning.

- B. Sequential thinking

Key words: safekeeping, structured, organized, complexity or detailed, planned.
Preferred activities: following directions, detail-oriented work, step-by-step problem solving, organization, implementation.

- C. Interpersonal thinking

Key words: kinesthetic, emotional, spiritual, sensory, feeling.
Preferred activities: listening to and expressing ideas, looking for personal meaning, sensory input, group interaction.

- D. Imaginative thinking

Key words: visual, holistic, intuitive, innovative, conceptual.
Preferred activities: looking at the big picture, taking initiative, challenging assumptions, visuals, metaphoric thinking, creative problem solving, long-term thinking.

His theory was based on theories of the modularity of cognitive functions, including well-documented specializations in the brain's cerebral cortex and limbic systems, and the research into left-right brain lateralization by Roger Wolcott Sperry, Robert Ornstein, Henry Mintzberg, and Michael Gazzaniga. These theories were further developed to reflect a metaphor for how individuals think and learn. Use of that metaphor brought later criticism by brain researchers such as Terence Hines for being overly simplistic, though advocates argue that the metaphorical construct has been beneficial in organizational contexts including business and government.

Herrmann also coined the concept Whole Brain Thinking as a description of flexibility in using thinking styles that one may cultivate in individuals or in organizations allowing the situational use of all four styles of thinking.

=== The Herrmann brain dominance instrument ===
The format of the instrument is a 116-question online assessment, which determines the degree of preference for each of the model's four styles of thinking. More than one style may be dominant (or a primary preference) at once in this model. For example, in Herrmann's presentation a person may have strong preferences in both analytical and sequential styles of thinking but lesser preferences in interpersonal or imaginative modes, though he asserts all people use all styles to varying degrees.

A 1985 dissertation by C. Bunderson, currently CEO of the non-profit EduMetrics Institute asserts that "four stable, discrete clusters of preference exist", "scores derived from the instrument are valid indicators of the four clusters", and "The scores permit valid inferences about a person's preferences and avoidances for each of these clusters of mental activity".

=== Consulting and training ===
Based on the HBDI Assessment and Whole Brain model, Herrmann International and its global affiliates offer consulting and solutions (including workshops, programs, books and games) to improve personal or group communication, creativity, and other benefits.

== Critiques ==
=== Self reporting ===
Measurements that require people to state preferences between terms have received criticism. Researchers C. W. Allinson and J. Hayes, in their own 1996 publication of a competing cognitive style indicator called Cognitive Style Index in the peer reviewed Journal of Management Studies, noted that "there appears to be little or no published independent evaluation of several self-report measures developed as management training tools. [including] Herrmann brain dominance instrument."

However, some find usefulness in self reporting measurements. Researchers G.P. Hodgkinson and E. Sadler-Smith in 2003 found cognitive style indicators generally useful for studying organizations. However, in a critique of the Cognitive Style Index indicator they opined that progress in the field had been "hampered by a proliferation of alternative constructs and assessment instruments" many unreliable with a lack of agreement over nomenclature.

To measure self-report consistency, a differential item functioning review of HBDI was published in 2007 by Jared Lees. However, his tests were supported by EduMetrics, a company on contract with Herrmann International to evaluate the system, and were therefore not completely independent.

=== Lateralization ===
Ned Herrmann's original research for the HBDI was rooted in the lateralization of brain function theory championed by Gazzaniga and others that associates key thinking styles with a specific neuroanatomical systems in the human brain.

The notion of hemisphere dominance attracted some criticism from the neuroscience community, notably by Terence Hines who called it "pop psychology" based on unpublished EEG data. He asserts that current literature instead found that both hemispheres are always involved in cognitive tasks and attempting to strengthen a specific hemisphere does not improve creativity, for example. Hines stated "No evidence is presented to show that these 'brain dominance measures' measure anything related to the differences between the two hemispheres. In other words, no evidence of validity [of hemisphere dominance] is presented.".

=== Creativity ===
Herrmann offered creativity workshops based on leveraging all the quadrants within the Whole Brain Model, rather than focusing on physiological attributes, strengthening particular thinking styles and strengthening the right hemisphere, which received critiques that creativity is not localized to a particular thinking style nor to a particular hemisphere.

A study published in the peer reviewed Creativity Research Journal in 2005 by J. Meneely and M. Portillo agreed that creativity is not localized into a particular thinking style, such as a right-brain dominance resulting in more creativity. They did however find correlation between creativity in design students based on how flexible they were using all four thinking styles equally as measured by the HBDI. When students were less entrenched in a specific style of thinking they measured higher creativity using Domino's Creativity Scale (ACL-Cr).
