= Nikhil Koratkar =

American mechanical engineer

Academic background
- Education: BSc, aerospace engineering, Indian Institute of Technology Bombay; M. Eng, PhD, University of Maryland, College Park
- Thesis: Smart helicopter rotor with piezoelectric bender actuated trailing-edge flaps (2000)

Academic work
- Institutions: Rensselaer Polytechnic Institute
- Main interests: one-dimensional and two-dimensional materials and devices

Nikhil Ashok Koratkar is an Indian-American engineer. He is the John A. Clark and Edward T. Crossan Endowed Chair Professor of Mechanical Engineering and Materials Science at Rensselaer Polytechnic Institute. In 2010, he was appointed Editor of the Elsevier journal CARBON.

== Education ==
Koratkar earned his Bachelor's degree in aerospace engineering in 1995 from the Indian Institute of Technology Bombay. He then moved to the United States and earned his master's degree in aerospace engineering in 1998 and his PhD in aerospace engineering in 2000 from the University of Maryland, College Park.

== Career ==
After receiving his doctorate degree, Koratkar joined the faculty of the Mechanical Engineering Department at Rensselaer Polytechnic Institute in 2001 as an assistant professor. He was promoted to associate professor in 2006 and to full professor in 2009. In 2011, Koratkar was also appointed a full professor in the Department of Materials Science and Engineering at Rensselaer. In 2012, Koratkar was appointed the John A. Clark and Edward T. Crossan Endowed Chair Professor at RPI.

He was named a Fellow of the American Physical Society in 2023, "for distinguished contributions to nanoscale science and technology, including the discovery of partial van der Waals transparency in graphene, and for pioneering the use of nanostructured materials in composites and energy storage devices".
