= Jonsson-Rowland Science Center =

- Interactive map of the Jonsson-Rowland Science Center area
- Alternative names: J-ROWL
- Etymology: Named for J. Erik Jonsson and Henry A. Rowland

General information
- Location: Troy, New York, United States
- Coordinates: 42°43′44″N 73°40′49″W
- Opened: October 21, 1961

Technical details
- Floor count: 4
- Lifts/elevators: 2

Design and construction
- Architecture firm: Voorhees, Walker, Smith & Smith (formally Voorhees, Gmelin and Walker)

The Jonsson-Rowland Science Center (J-ROWL) is home to the School of Science at Rensselaer Polytechnic Institute in Troy, New York. It is named for J. Erik Jonsson and Henry A. Rowland. The building was dedicated on 21 October 1961.

The Science Center serves primarily as an academic building, hosting both lecture and laboratory courses for the School of Science. Additionally, the building hosts the Hirsch Observatory, which is used both for academic work and club activities.

The building is connected with the Jonsson Engineering Center (JEC) to its north via tunnel, accessible through both stairs and elevator from the building's basement level.

== History ==
Prior to the construction of the Jonsson-Rowland Science Center, Rensselaer Polytechnic Institute had developed a plan to develop institutional research, increase graduate enrollment, and modernize the campus. The construction of the Jonsson-Rowland Science Center would mark the institutes first step towards fulfilling this plan as it would host the modern laboratories necessary for this development of the campus.

The building was designed as a four-story building, joined at right angles. It was designed by the architects Voorhees, Walker, Smith & Smith, formally known as the firm Voorhees, Gmelin and Walker at a cost of $3,003,000.

The first phase of the science center which was proposed included two laboratories. The laboratories were designed as modular units, which had movable metal walls meant to create a flexible lab space The building was named for these two laboratories which it houses. The Jonsson Laboratory for the Study and Teaching of Science was named for J. Erik Jonsson, RPI Class of 1922, who provided funds to build and equip the laboratory; the Rowland Physics Laboratory was named in memory of Henry A. Rowland, RPI Class of 1870, Physicist and first President of the American Physical Society. When fully constructed, the building housed offices for the School of Science and Physics and Mechanics departments in addition to these laboratories.

The Science Center was dedicated on October 21, 1961, along with the Gaerttner Linear Accelerator (LINAC), which was obtained under an Atomic Energy Commission Contact. The dedication ceremony of the Science Center was somewhat unique, as instead of the traditional ribbon cutting customary to dedications, the building was instead opened by cutting a chain with a blow torch.

In 1983, the Hirsch Observatory was moved from its original position to make room for the construction of the Low Center for Industrial Innovation, and placed on the roof of the building's south wing, where it remains to this day.

== Recognition ==
The Institute received recognition for leading in technology from President John F. Kennedy for the construction of the Jonsson-Rowland Science Center and the Linear accelerator. Kennedy gave his recognition in a message to the institutes, having stated that “the dedication of the new Science Center and Linear accelerator at Rensselaer is a significant event in the life of one of our leading technological institutions.”

== See also ==
- List of science centers
