= Ricketts Building =

Coordinates: 42°43′51″N 73°40′47″W

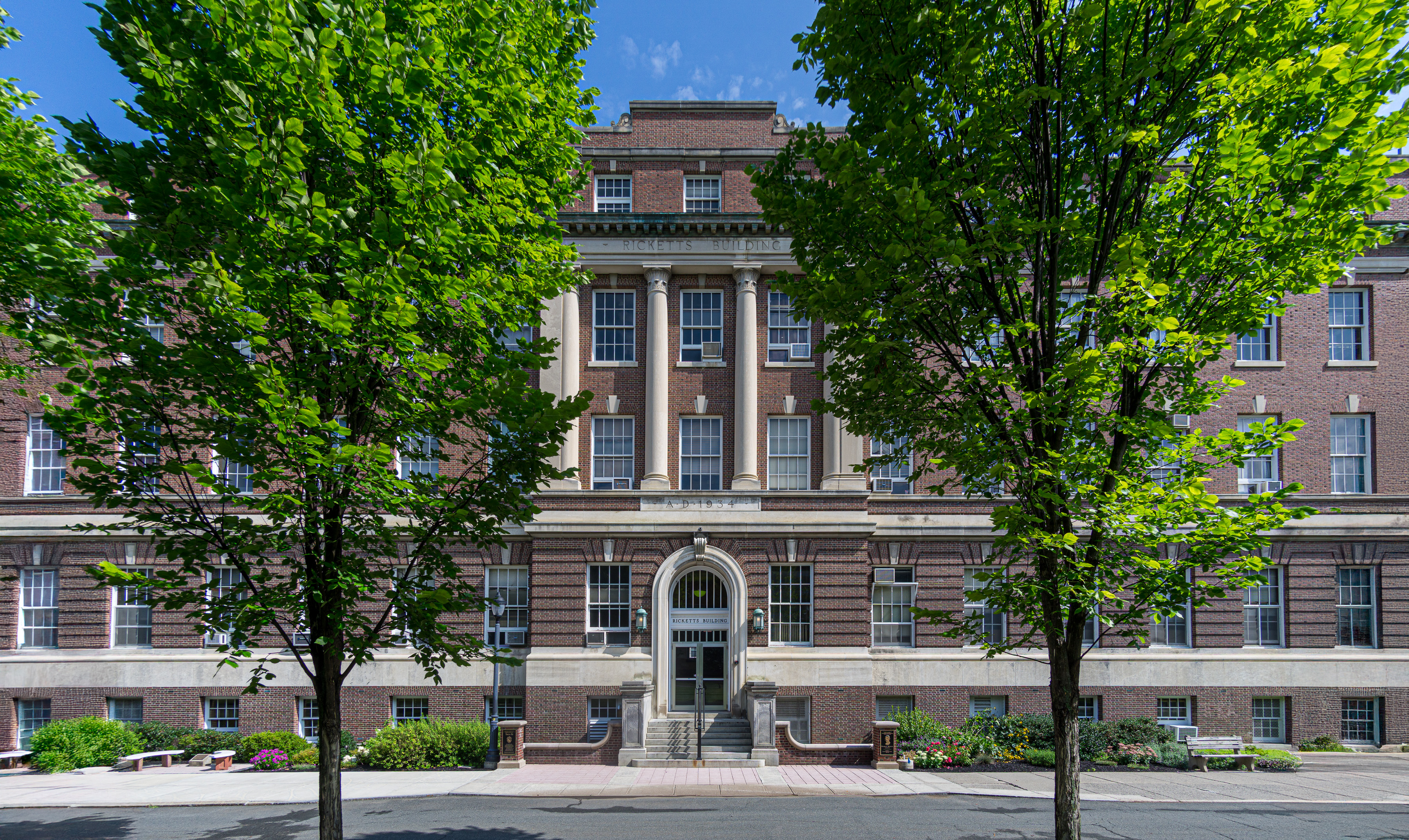
Ricketts Building, 2019

Ricketts Building is a building that is home to the Department of Chemical and Biological Engineering at the Rensselaer Polytechnic Institute in Troy, New York. It is named for Palmer C. Ricketts, the ninth president of Rensselaer Polytechnic Institute. The building opened in 1935. It is currently used for labs, lectures, and some clubs.

== History ==
In 1933, during the final years of what is commonly referred as the “Ricketts Campus”, Palmer Ricketts initiated construction of a new laboratory building. The original name proposed for this new building to house these facilities was to be Van Rensselaer Hall, in honor of the founder of the Rensselaer Polytechnic Institute. However, when the laboratory building opened in 1935, it was instead officially named the Ricketts Building in memory of Palmer C. Ricketts, who died December 10, 1934. According to Palmer C. Rickett, “The new laboratory building will be 184 feet long and 59 feet wide with four stories and a basement. It will house three laboratories and will have some lecture and recitations rooms. The laboratories are the aeronautical, the metallurgical and the chemical engineering.” It was built of Harvard brick and Indiana limestone, with steel and concrete floors and heavy tile interior walls. He had hoped that the building to be first college building to be erected with a welded steel frame. The elevator in the building today is a manually operated Otis Freight elevator that was most likely installed when the building was built in 1933.

== Current Use ==
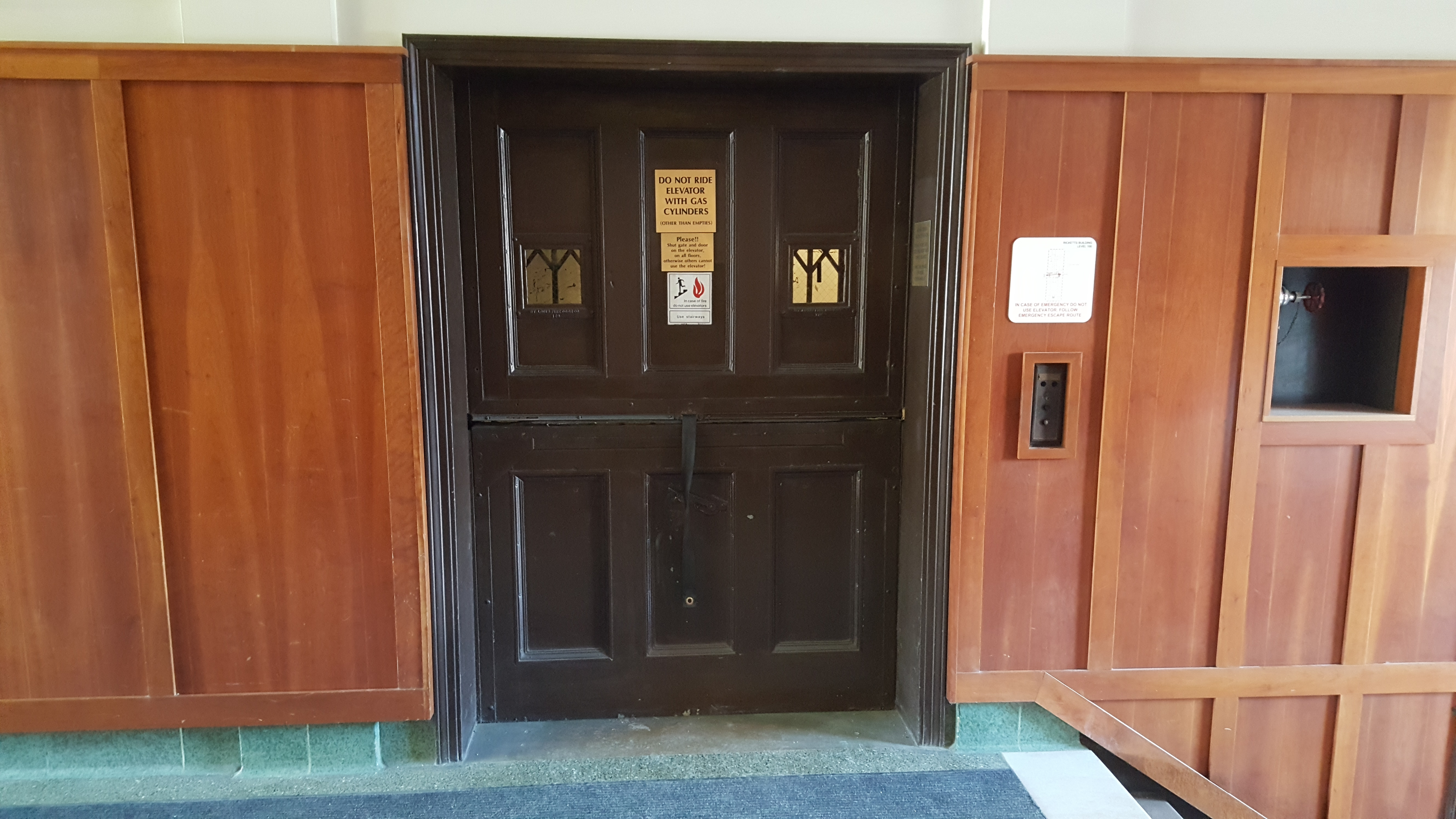
First floor of Ricketts Elevator

The building houses the Department of Chemical and Biological Engineering on its first floor. During the day the building operates labs on all but the second floor where Ricketts Building’s lecture halls and classrooms are held. After classes, the building hosts clubs such as the Rensselaer Rocket Society, RPI’s Design Build Fly team, Rensselaer Electric Vehicle Club, and the RPI Chem-E-Car team on the top floor with other clubs and groups utilizing the second floors rooms for other activities.

In a 1989 issue of Chemical Engineering Education, RPI professor Michael Abbott alleged that Ricketts was interred underneath his memorial plaque in the building.

In a 2019 issue of the university newspaper, two separate places in and around the Ricketts Building were listed in a humorous article about the best places to cry on campus.

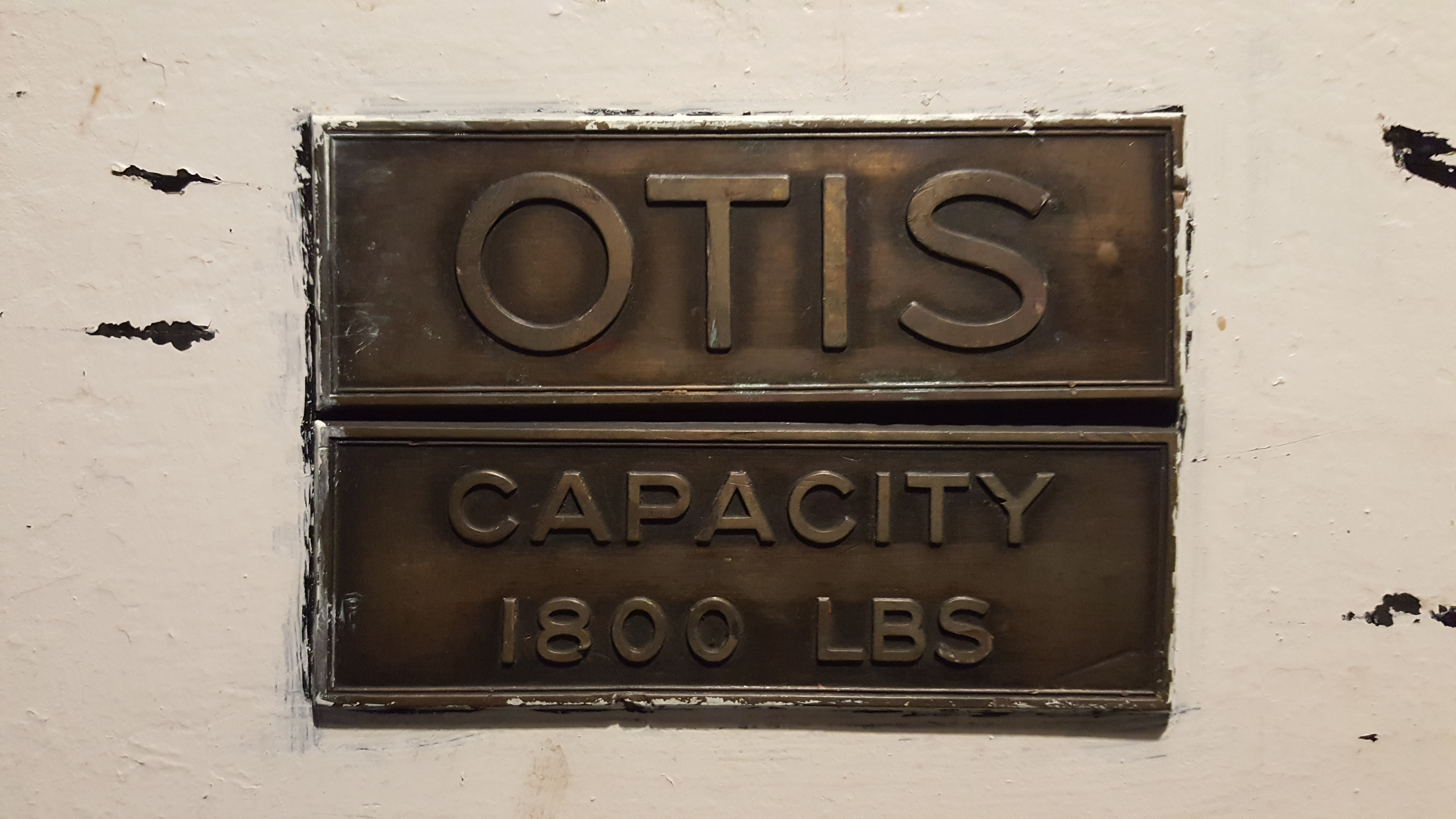
Weight limit plaque of the Ricketts Building elevator.
