= Lally School of Management =

Business school in Troy, New York

Coordinates: 42.7300°N 73.6818°W

The Lally School of Management
- Rensselaer Polytechnic Institute
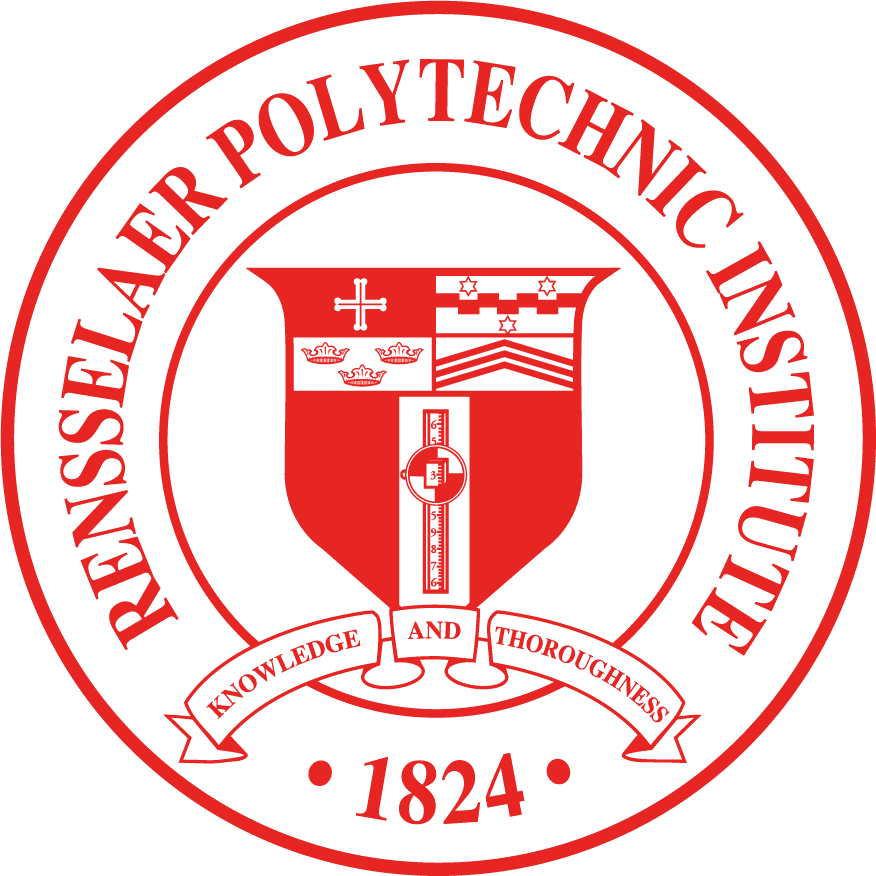
- Type: Private
- Established: 1963; 63 years ago
- Endowment: $28.5 million
- Dean: Liad Wagman, Ph.D.
- Faculty: 27
- Administrative staff: 56
- Undergraduates: 354
- Postgraduates: 655
- Location: Troy, NY, USA
- Campus: Urban
- Website: lally.rpi.edu
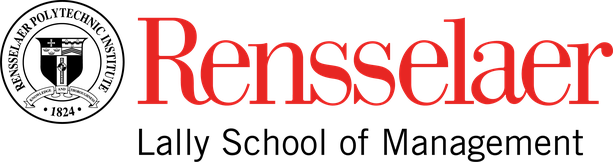

The Lally School of Management is the business school of Rensselaer Polytechnic Institute (RPI), located in Troy, New York. Established in 1963, the school is known for its emphasis on the integration of management, technology, and innovation. Lally offers a range of undergraduate, graduate, and doctoral programs, with specializations in areas such as business analytics, management, entrepreneurship, and finance.

The school places a strong emphasis on research and interdisciplinary collaboration, drawing on RPI's strengths in science, engineering, and technology to prepare students for leadership roles in various sectors of the global economy. The Lally School is accredited by the Association to Advance Collegiate Schools of Business (AACSB).

Lally's faculty includes scholars and industry professionals who engage in research across disciplines such as finance, information technology, supply chain management, and artificial intelligence.

== History ==
The Lally school, founded in 1963, is relatively new to RPI, which was founded in 1824. The Lally school was originally solely a management program for engineers. It was originally housed in the Jonsson Engineering Center and Lally Management Center, before finally being moved to the larger Pittsburgh Building. The management school was named after Rensselaer trustee Kenneth T. Lally and his wife, Thelma P. Lally. Kenneth T. Lally has been an important member of the Rensselaer community since 1970. The Lallys wanted the school to be known throughout the world as the "best of the breed". Lally, an entrepreneur who saved the historic W.& L.E Gurley Company (now Gurley Precision Instruments), knew the challenge of managing a technological venture. To help the management school gain national prominence, the Lallys gave $15 million, which was, up until 2001, the largest single gift in Rensselaer's history. To honor the benefactors and to more properly reflect the school's unique focus, the school became the Kenneth T. and Thelma P. Lally School of Management and Technology.

The Pittsburgh Building was completed in 1912 and originally contained the administrative offices of the institute, the library, and the Geological and Mineralogical Museum. "It was presented by the members of the Pittsburgh Alumni Association, and has cost furnished about $150,000."

== Accreditation ==
The school is accredited by the Association to Advance Collegiate Schools of Business (AACSB).

== Academics ==
The Lally school offers the following programs:

- Full-time Residential
- Executive MBA
- Ph.D. Program
- Undergraduate Management Degree
- Graduate Management Degrees
- Specialized Corporate Programs

As part of an experiential learning environment, students work on the patent portfolio from Rensselaer’s Office of Commercialization in the Incubator as part of their strategy class. They take on real-world problems and research for local companies; and work with faculty on radical innovation projects for large, established firms.
