= The Rensselaer Polytechnic =

Rensselaer Polytechnic Institute's student newspaper

- Type: Weekly student newspaper
- Format: Tabloid
- School: Rensselaer Polytechnic Institute
- Editor-in-chief: Meher Randeria
- Founded: 1869; 157 years ago
- Headquarters: The Polytechnic c/o Rensselaer Union; 15th Street; Troy, NY 12180; United States
- Circulation: As of 2018 - online only 2016 to 2018 - 3,000; Prior to 2018 - 6,000
- Website: poly.rpi.edu

The Rensselaer Polytechnic is the student-run news organization of Rensselaer Polytechnic Institute. Prior to 2018, it was published in print every Wednesday during the Institute's fall and spring academic calendars (except during holiday and examination periods), but now publishes online at poly.rpi.edu, following the same schedule.

== Organization ==
=== About The Polytechnic ===
The Rensselaer Polytechnic, which is also called The Polytechnic or The Poly, was founded in 1869; however, The Poly has only been publishing continuously since 1885. It marked its 125th year of service to the RPI community during the fall of 2008.

In addition to regular issues, The Poly has historically published a parody issue each semester and an elections issue that endorses student government candidates and provides profiles of registered candidates for all levels of student government. The Poly has also produced several special inserts throughout the year in the past, including the Club Directory, Troy Business Guide, men's and women's hockey previews, and Grand Marshal Week recap.

=== Distribution ===
The Polytechnic had a circulation of 6,000, then 3,000, with most of the copies distributed on campus to areas including the Rensselaer Union, dining halls, and academic buildings. The Poly was also delivered to the Rensselaer Technology Park, downtown Troy, and Russell Sage College in the past. As of September 19, 2018, The Poly is no longer distributed in print, as its Editorial Board unanimously voted to end the paper's regular printing schedule, instead focusing effort on online publication.

=== Financials ===
For much of the club's history The Polytechnic had one of the largest club budgets, funded entirely through advertising revenue without any subsidy from the Rensselaer Union.

== Major sections ==
The Polytechnic is organized into four major sections.

News
Includes In the Nation and World, Incident Blotter, Weird Off the Wire, and Rensselaer in Brief.
Editorial/Opinion
Includes staff editorials, staff notebooks, Top Hat, Derby, letters to the editor, and President's Corner.
Features
Includes reviews and articles on campus or area events.
Sports
Includes round ups.

== Parodies ==
In 1980-81 a parody of The Poly, named The Folly, was published and distributed anonymously across the campus. Typical of the humor was the 'Sports In Brief' section featuring a scantily clad person performing yoga.
