= Rensselaer Polytechnic Institute =

Private research university in Troy, New York

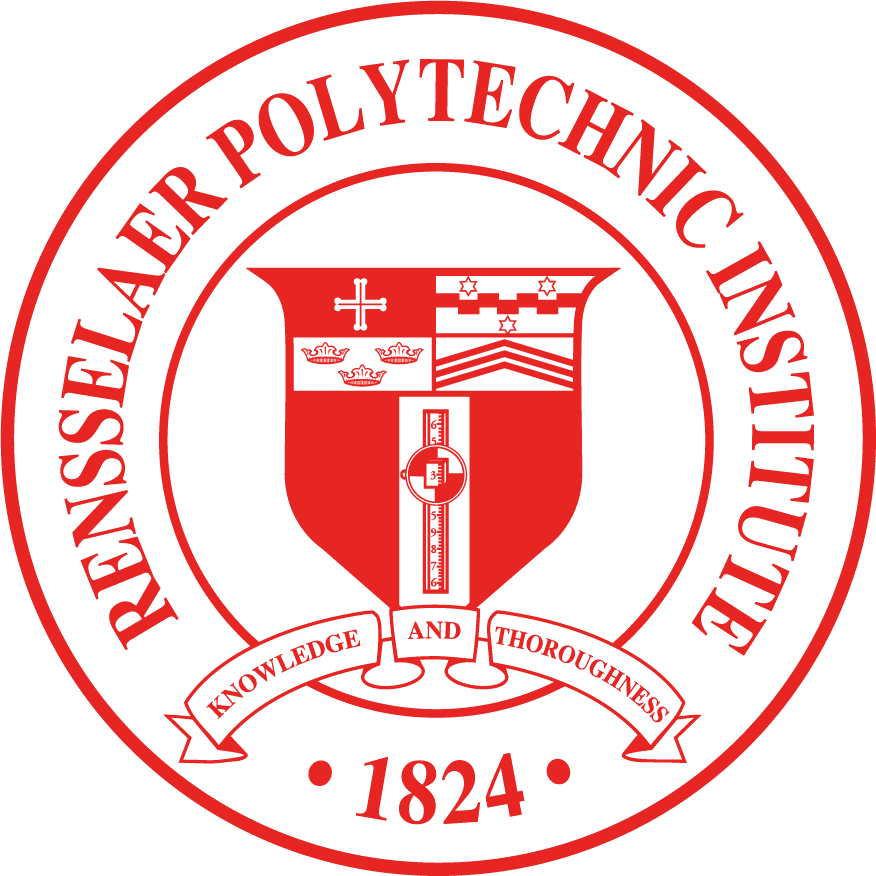
- Former names: Rensselaer School (1824–1834); Rensselaer Institute (1834–1861)
- Motto: "Knowledge and Thoroughness"
- Type: Private research university
- Established: November 5, 1824; 201 years ago
- Accreditation: MSCHE
- Academic affiliations: NAICU; AITU; Space-grant
- Endowment: $1.02 billion (2025)
- President: Martin A. Schmidt
- Provost: Rebecca W. Doerge
- Academic staff: 488 (2019)
- Administrative staff: 1,291 (2019)
- Students: 8,142 (2019)
- Undergraduates: 6,203 (2019)
- Postgraduates: 1,366 (2019)
- Other students: 573 (2019)
- Location: Troy, New York, United States; 42.7300°N 73.6775°W
- Campus: 265 acres (107 ha); Small city
- Other campuses: Bolton Landing; Hartford; New York; North Berwick
- Newspaper: The Rensselaer Polytechnic
- Colors: Cherry and white
- Nickname: Engineers
- Sporting affiliations: NCAA Division III – Liberty League; ECAC Hockey
- Mascots: Red Hawks; Puckman
- Website: rpi.edu
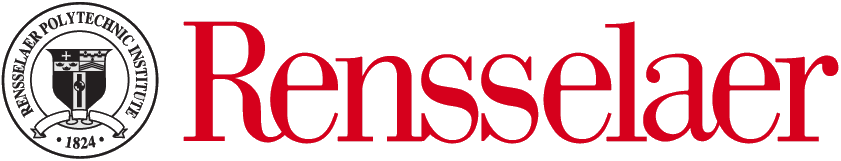

Rensselaer Polytechnic Institute (/rɛnsəˈlɪər/ ren-sə-LEER; RPI) is a private research university in Troy, New York, United States. It is the oldest technological university in the English-speaking world and in the Western Hemisphere. Stephen Van Rensselaer and Amos Eaton established RPI in 1824 for the "application of science to the common purposes of life".

Built on a hillside, RPI's 265-acre (107 ha) campus overlooks the city of Troy and the Hudson River. The institute operates an on‑campus business incubator and the 1,250-acre (510 ha) Rensselaer Technology Park.

Organizationally, RPI has six main schools which contain 37 departments, with an emphasis on science and technology. It is classified among "R1: Doctoral Universities: Very High Research Activity".

== History ==
=== 1824–1900 ===
Stephen van Rensselaer, founder of Rensselaer Polytechnic Institute

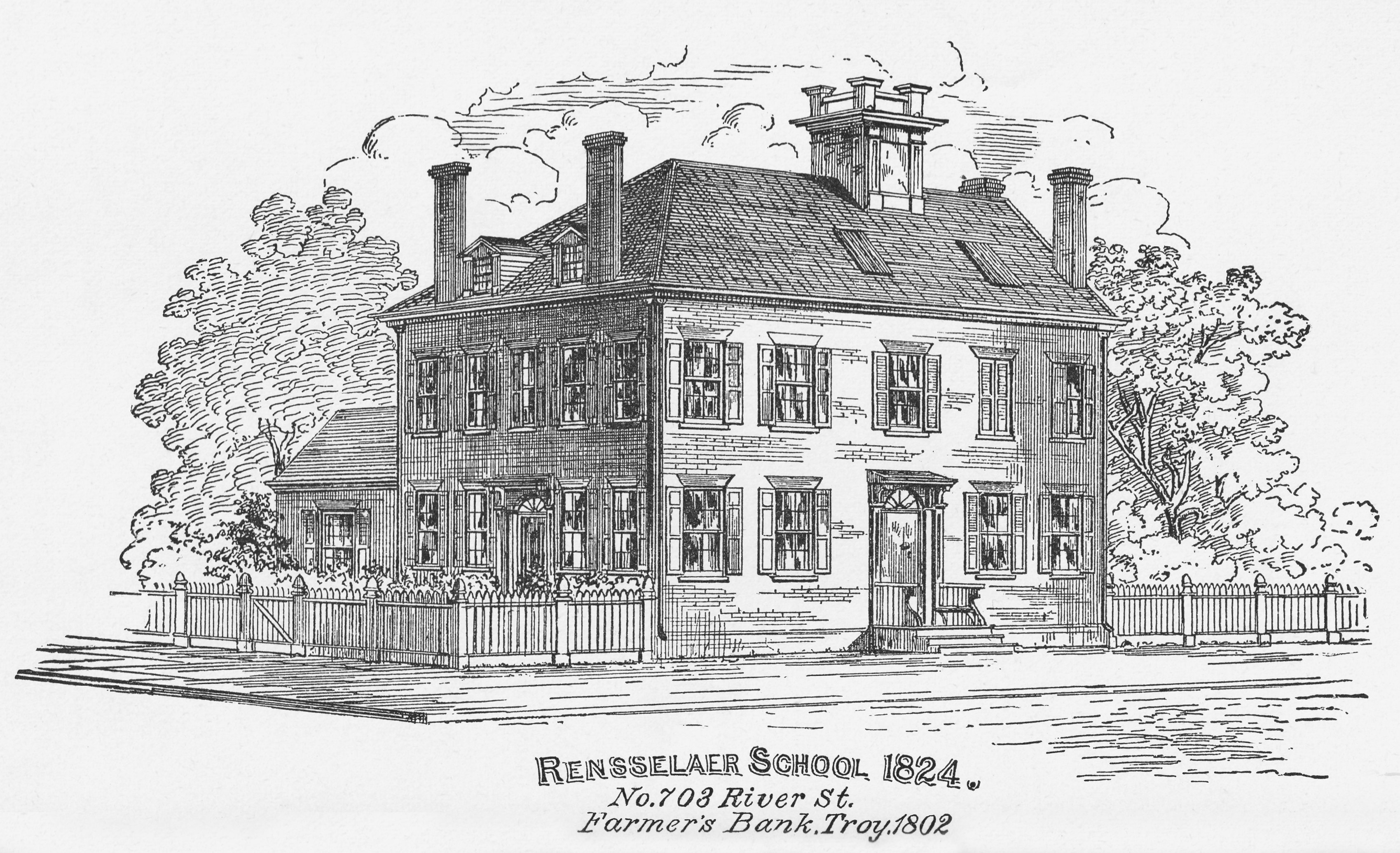
Engraving of the original Rensselaer School

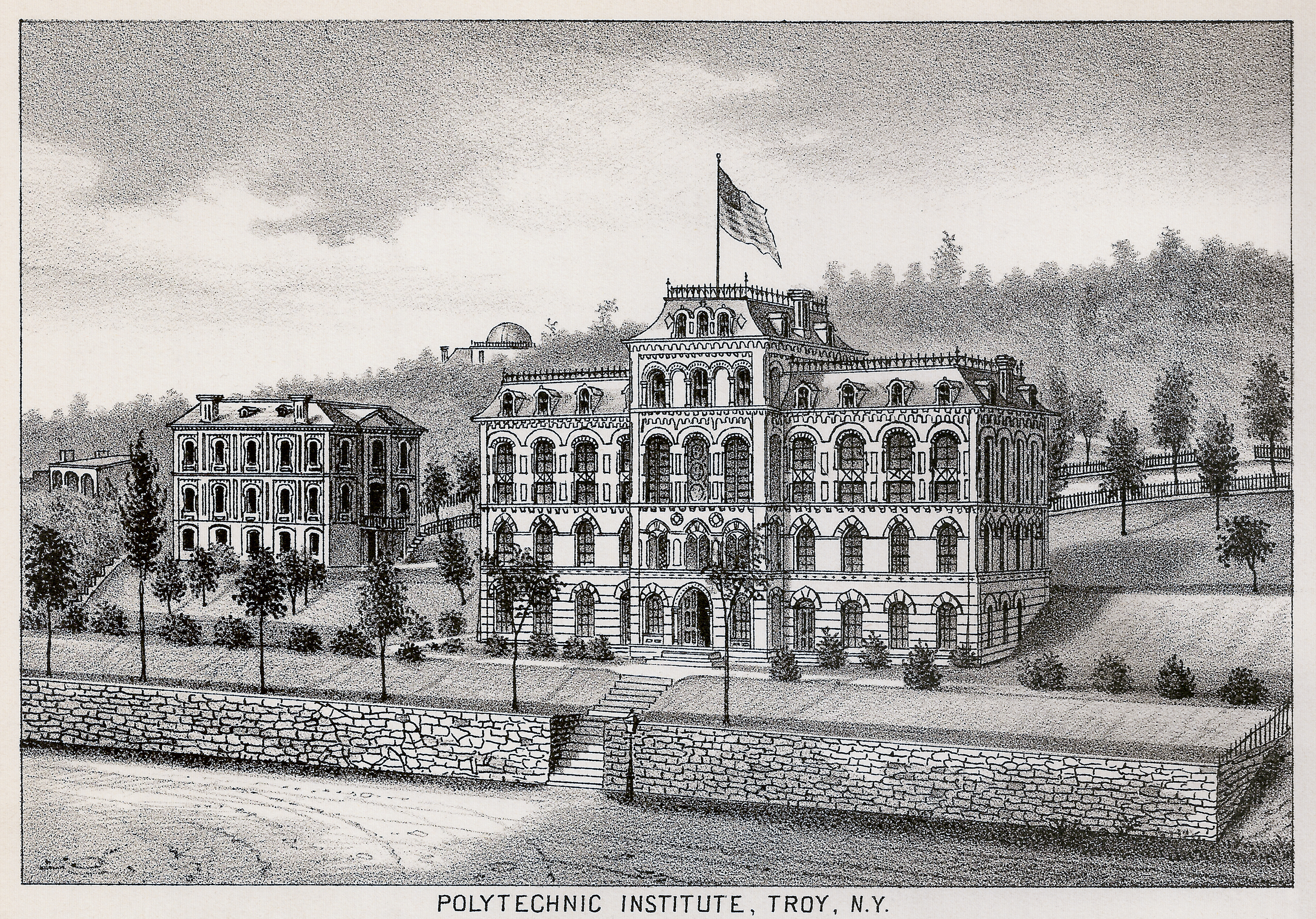
Engraving of RPI in 1876

Stephen Van Rensselaer established the Rensselaer School on 5 November 1824 with a letter to the Reverend Dr. Samuel Blatchford, in which Van Rensselaer asked Blatchford to serve as the first president. Within the letter he set down several orders of business. He appointed Amos Eaton as the school's first senior professor and appointed the first board of trustees. The school opened on Monday, 5 January 1825 at the Old Bank Place, a building at the north end of Troy. Tuition was around $40 per semester (equivalent to $800 in 2012). The fact that the school attracted students from as far as Ohio and Pennsylvania is attributed to the reputation of Eaton. Fourteen months of successful trial led to the incorporation of the school on 21 March 1826 by the state of New York. In its early years, the Rensselaer School strongly resembled a graduate school more than it did a college, drawing graduates from many older institutions.

Under Eaton, the Rensselaer School, renamed the Rensselaer Institute in 1832, was a small but vibrant center for technological research. The first civil engineering degrees in the United States were granted by the school in 1835, and many of the best remembered civil engineers of that time graduated from the school. Important visiting scholars included Joseph Henry, who had previously studied under Amos Eaton, and Thomas Davenport, who sold the world's first working electric motor to the institute.

In 1847 alumnus Benjamin Franklin Greene became the new senior professor. Earlier he had done a thorough study of European technical schools to see how Rensselaer could be improved. In 1850 he reorganized the school into a three-year polytechnic institute with six technical schools. In 1861 the name was changed to Rensselaer Polytechnic Institute. A severe conflagration of 10 May 1862, known as "The Great Fire", destroyed more than 507 buildings in Troy and gutted 75 acres (300,000 m^{2}) in the heart of the city. The "Infant School" building that housed the institute at the time was destroyed in this fire. Columbia University proposed that Rensselaer leave Troy altogether and merge with its New York City campus. Ultimately, the proposal was rejected, and the campus left the crowded downtown for the hillside. Classes were temporarily held at the Vail House and in the Troy University building until 1864, when the institute moved to a building on Broadway on 8th Street, now the site of the Approach.

One of the first Latino student organizations in the United States was founded at RPI in 1890. The Club Hispano Americano was established by the international Latin American students that attended the institute at this time.

=== Since 1900 ===
Seal with the coat of arms designed by Richard Clipston Sturgis in 1904

In 1904, the institute was for the fourth time devastated by fire, when its main building was completely destroyed. However, RPI underwent a period of academic and resource expansion under the leadership of President Palmer Ricketts. Named president in 1901, Ricketts liberalized the curriculum by adding the Department of Arts, Science, and Business Administration, in addition to the Graduate School. He also expanded the university's resources and developed RPI into a true polytechnic institute by increasing the number of degrees offered from two to twelve; these included electrical engineering, mechanical engineering, biology, chemistry, and physics. During Rickett's tenure, enrollment increased from approximately 200 in 1900 to a high of 1,700 in 1930.

Another period of expansion occurred following World War II as returning veterans used their GI Bill education benefits to attend college. The "Freshman Hill" residence complex was opened in 1953 followed by the completion of the Commons Dining Hall in 1954, two more halls in 1958, and three more in 1968. In this same time frame (1966) Herta Regina Leng was appointed as RPI's first female full professor. She is now honored there with an annual lecture series. In 1961, there was major progress in academics at the institute with the construction of the Gaerttner Linear Accelerator, then the most powerful in the world, and the Jonsson-Rowland Science Center. The current Student Union building was opened in 1967.

The next three decades brought continued growth with many new buildings (see 'Campus' below), and growing ties to industry. The "H-building", previously used for storage, became the home for the RPI incubator program, the first such program sponsored solely by a university. Shortly after this, RPI decided to invest $3 million in pavement, water and power on around 1,200 acres (490 ha) of land it owned 5 miles (8.0 km) south of campus to create the Rensselaer Technology Park. In 1982 the New York State legislature granted RPI $30 million to build the George M. Low Center for Industrial Innovation, a center for industry-sponsored research and development.

In 1999, RPI gained attention when it was one of the first universities to implement a mandatory laptop computer program. This was also the year of the arrival of Shirley Ann Jackson, a former chairperson of the Nuclear Regulatory Commission under U.S. President Bill Clinton, as the eighteenth president of RPI. She instituted "The Rensselaer Plan" (discussed below), an ambitious plan to revitalize the institute. Many advances have been made under the plan, and Jackson has enjoyed the ongoing support of the RPI Board of Trustees. However, her leadership style did not sit well with many faculty; on 26 April 2006, RPI faculty voted 149 to 155 in a failed vote of no-confidence in Jackson. In September 2007, RPI's Faculty Senate was suspended for over four years over conflict with the administration. In 2011, the college was sanctioned by the American Association of University Professors "for infringement of governance standards".

On 3 October 2008, RPI celebrated the opening of the $220 million Experimental Media and Performing Arts Center. That same year the national economic downturn resulted in the elimination of 98 staff positions across the institute, about five percent of the workforce. Campus construction expansion continued, however, with the completion of the $92 million East Campus Athletic Village and opening of the new Blitman Commons residence hall in 2009. As of 2015, all staff positions had been reinstated at the institute, experiencing significant growth from pre-recession levels and contributing over $1 billion annually to the economy of the Capital District. That same year, renovation of the North Hall, E-Complex, and Quadrangle dormitories began and was later completed in 2016 to house one of the largest incoming classes in Rensselaer's history. In 2022, Rensselaer hosted a incoming class size of 2,110 students, the largest class size in Rensselaer's history.

In July 2022, Martin A. Schmidt, formerly provost of Massachusetts Institute of Technology, became RPI's nineteenth president.

== Campus ==
RPI's 275-acre (111 ha) campus sits upon a hill overlooking Troy and the Hudson River. The surrounding area is mostly residential neighborhoods, with the city of Troy lying at the base of the hill. The campus is bisected by 15th Street, with most of the athletic and housing facilities to the east, and the academic buildings to the west. A footbridge spans the street, linking the two halves. Much of the campus features a series of Colonial Revival style structures built in the first three decades of the 20th century. Overall, the campus has enjoyed four periods of expansion.

=== 1824–1905 ===
RPI was originally located in downtown Troy, but gradually moved to the hilltop that overlooks the city. Buildings that remain from this time include Winslow Chemical Laboratory, a building on the National Register of Historic Places. Located at the base of the hill on the western edge of campus, it currently houses the Social and Behavioral Research Laboratory.

=== Ricketts Campus, 1906–1935 ===
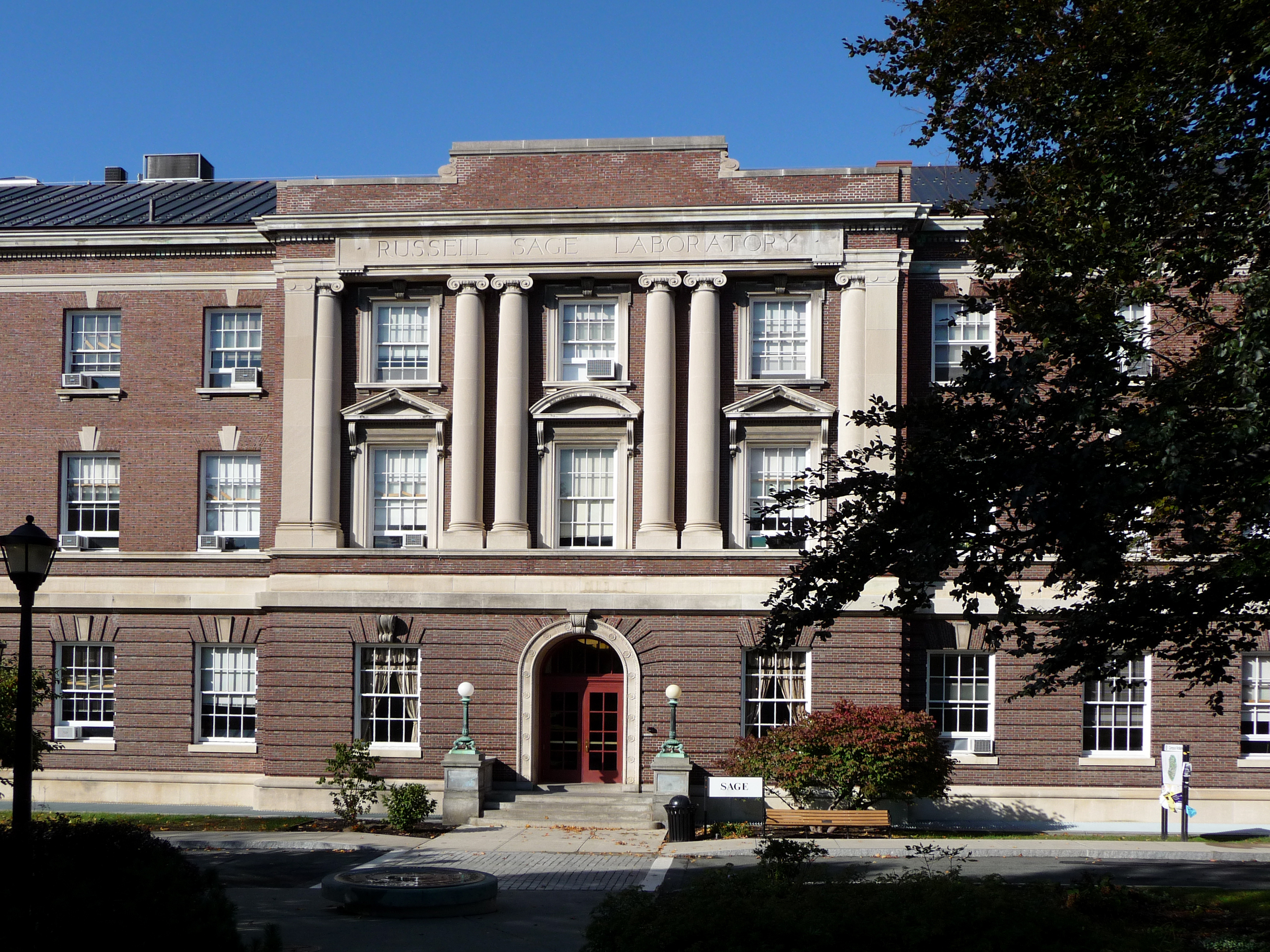
Russell Sage Laboratory

President Palmer Ricketts supervised the construction of the school's "Green Rooftop" Colonial Revival buildings that give much of the campus a distinct architectural style. Buildings constructed during this period include the Carnegie Building (1906), Walker Laboratory (1907), Russell Sage Laboratory (1909), Pittsburgh Building (1912), Quadrangle Dormitories (1916–1927), Troy Building (1925), Amos Eaton Hall (1928), Greene Building (1931) and Ricketts Building (1935). Also built during this period was "The Approach" (1907), a massive ornate granite staircase found on the west end of campus. Originally linking RPI to the Troy Union Railroad station, it again serves as an important link between the city and the university. In 1906 the '86 Field, home field of the football team until 2008, was completed with support of the Class of 1886. In 1912, to replace the old gymnasium, the Class of 1887 presented the '87 Gym to the campus, which featured a large swimming pool, indoor track, and bowling alleys.

=== Post-war expansion, 1946–1960 ===
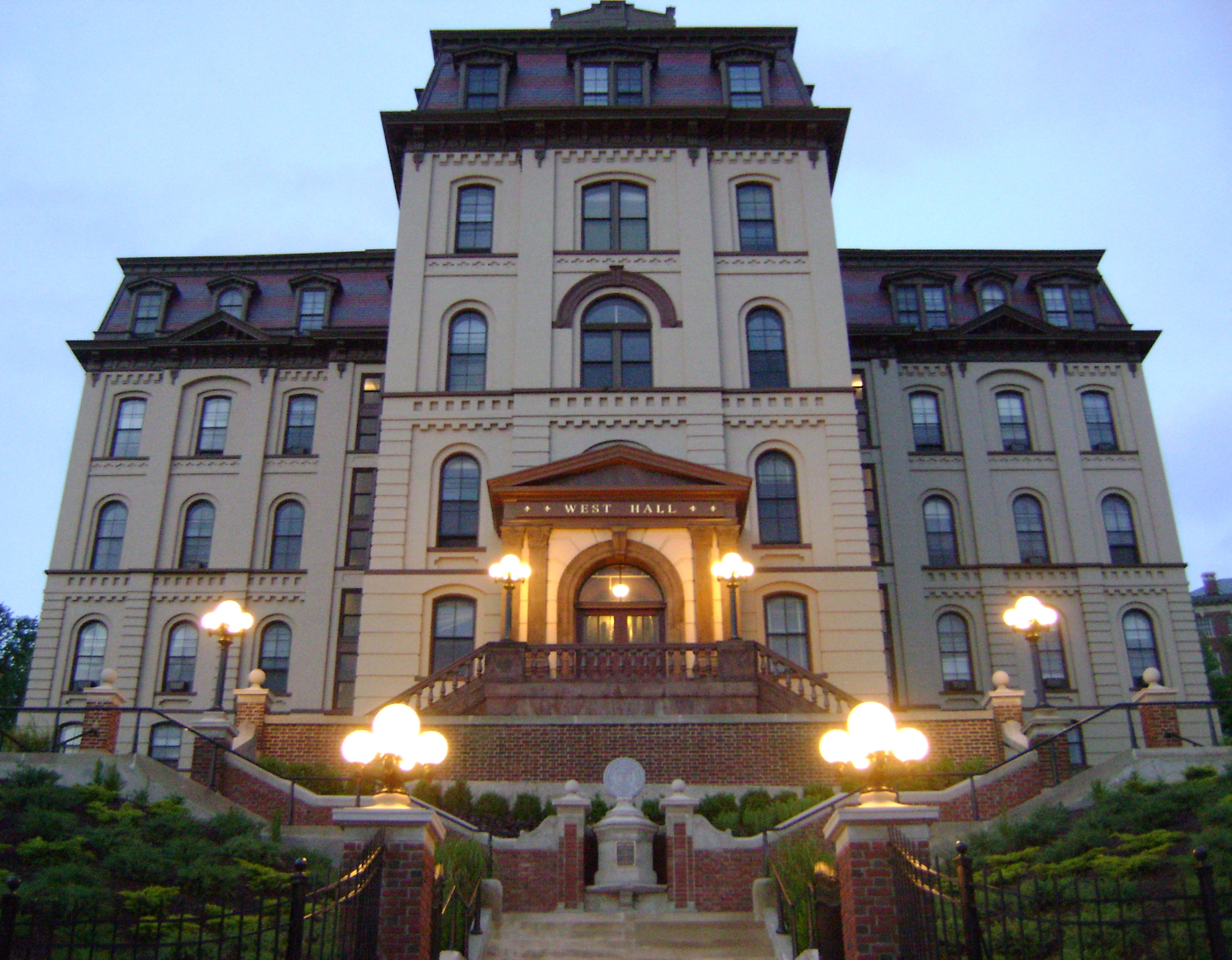
West Hall

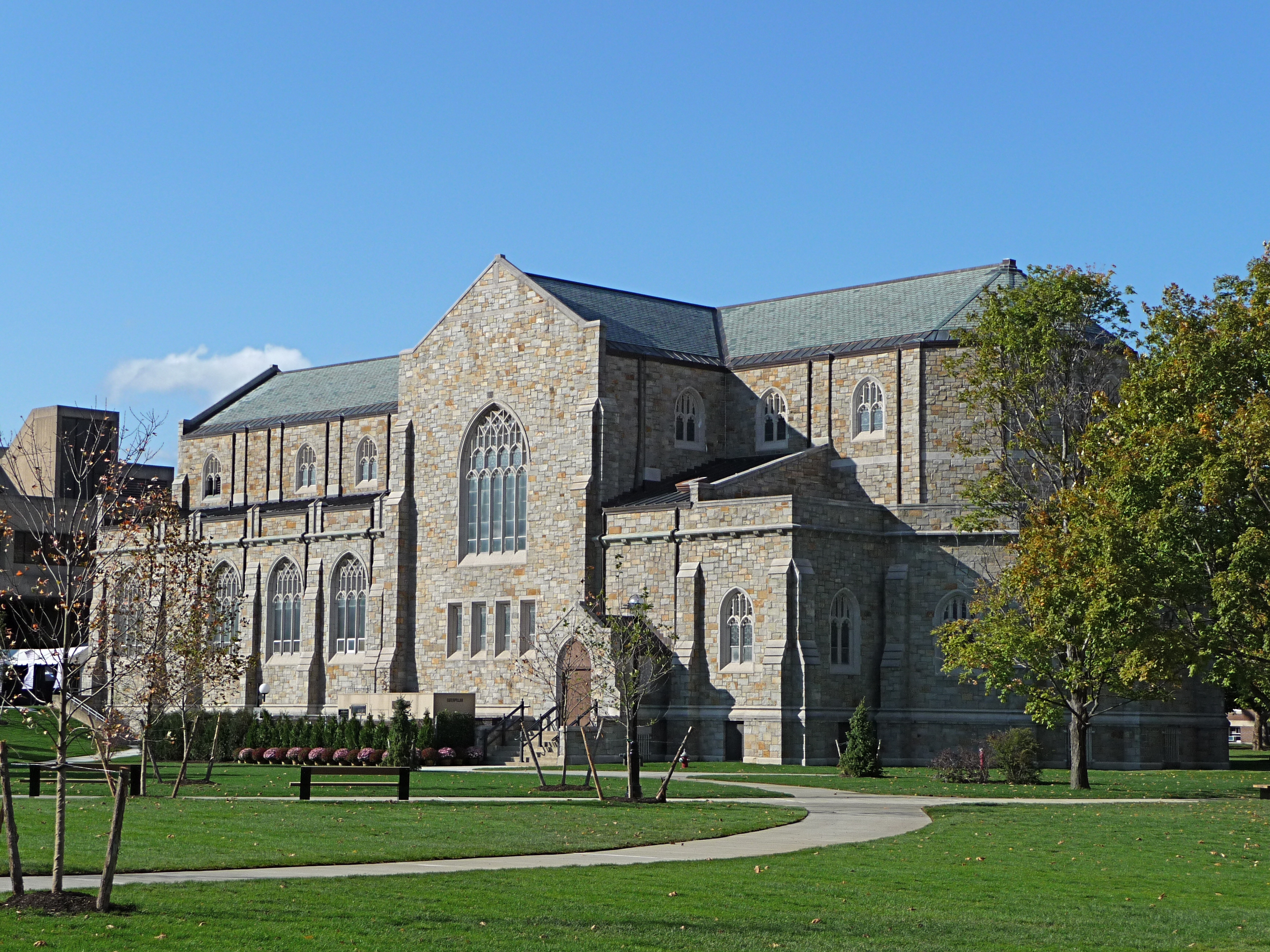
The Voorhees Computing Center

After World War II, the campus again underwent major expansion. Nine dormitories were built at the east edge of campus bordering Burdett Avenue, a location that came to be called "Freshman Hill". The Houston Field House (1949) was reassembled, after being moved in pieces from its original Rhode Island location. West Hall, which was originally built in 1869 as a hospital, was acquired by the institute in 1953. The ornate building is an example of French Second Empire architecture. It was listed on the National Register of Historic Places in 1973.

Another unique building is the Voorhees Computing Center (VCC). Originally the St. Joseph's Seminary chapel, it was built in 1933 and acquired by Rensselaer in 1958, and after renovation served as the institute's library from 1960 until the completion of the new Folsom Library, in 1976. The Folsom Library, located adjacent to the computing center, has a concrete exterior that was designed to harmonize with the light gray brick of the chapel; architecturally, it is an example of the modern brutalist style. Subsequently, the university was unsure of what to do with the chapel, or whether to keep it at all, but in 1979 decided to preserve it and renovate it to house computer labs and facilities to support the institute's computing initiatives. Today the VCC serves as the backbone for the institute's data and telephony infrastructure.

=== Modern campus, since 1961 ===
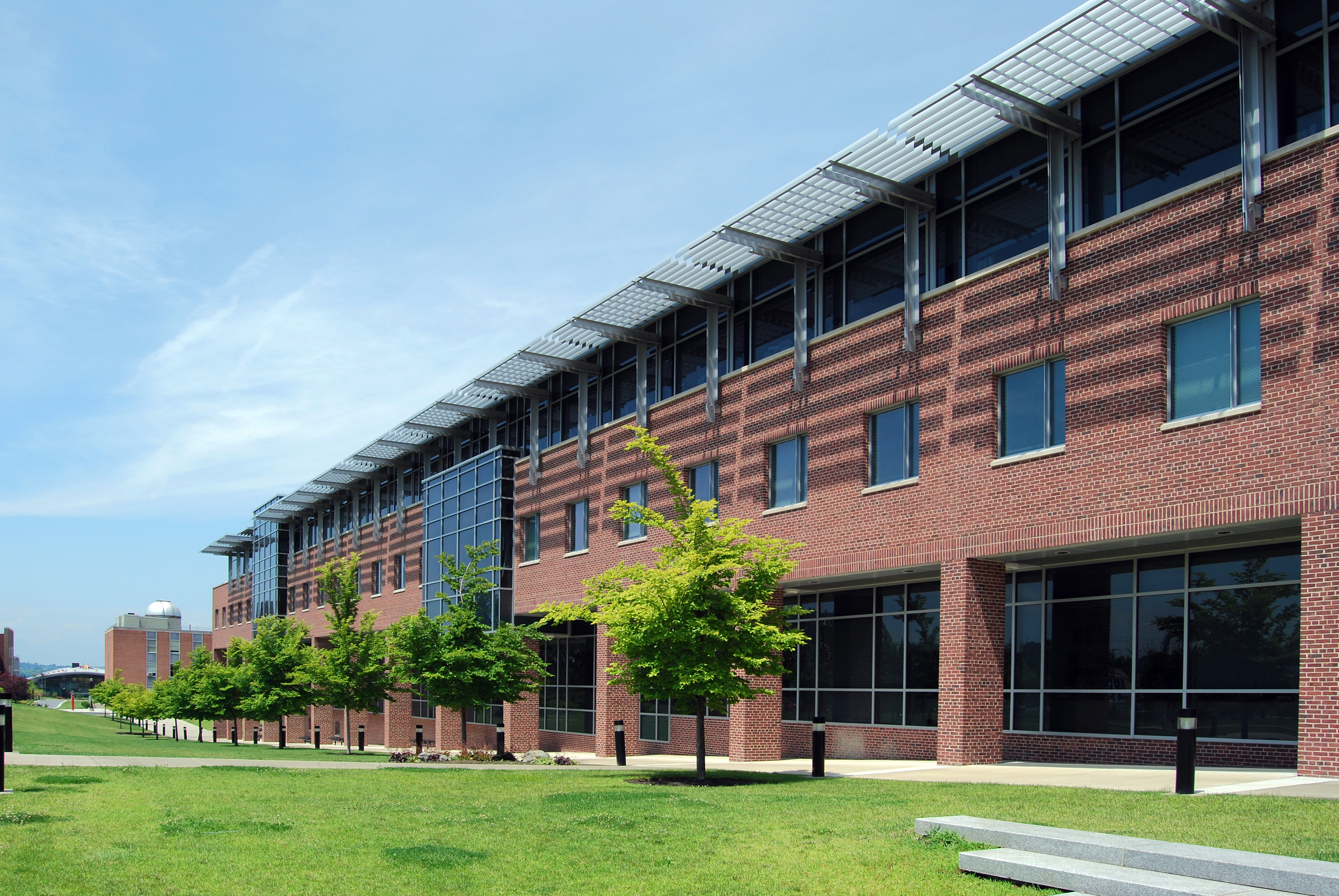
Center for Biotechnology and Interdisciplinary Studies

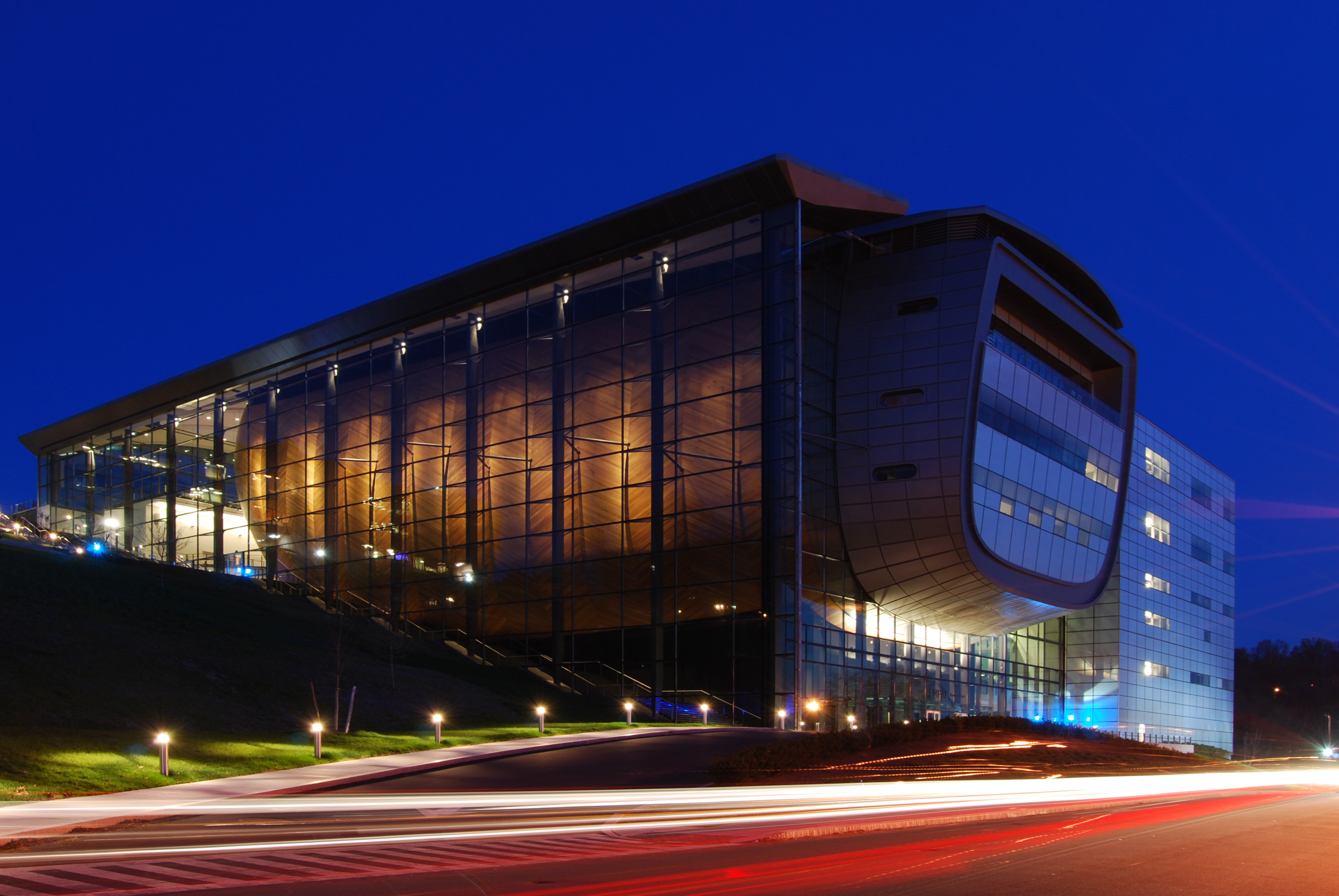
Experimental Media and Performing Arts Center

The modern campus features the Jonsson-Rowland Science Center (J-ROWL) (1961), Materials Research Center (MRC) (1965), Rensselaer Union (1967), Cogswell Laboratory (1971), Darrin Communications Center (DCC) (1973), Jonsson Engineering Center (JEC) (1977), Low Center for Industrial Innovation (CII) (1987), a public school building which was converted into Academy Hall (1990), and the Center for Biotechnology and Interdisciplinary Studies (2004). Tunnels connect the Low Center, DCC, JEC and Science Center. A tenth dormitory named Barton Hall was added to Freshman Hill in August 2000, featuring the largest rooms available for freshmen.

On 3 October 2008, the university celebrated the grand opening of the Experimental Media and Performing Arts Center (EMPAC) situated on the west edge of campus. The building was constructed on the precipice of the hill, with the main entrance on top. Upon entering, elevated walkways lead into a 1,200-seat concert hall. Most of the building is encased in a glass exoskeleton, with an atrium-like space between it and the "inner building". Adjacent to and underneath the main auditorium there is a 400-seat theater, offices, and two black-box studios with 35-foot (11 m) to 45-foot (14 m) ceilings. Originally budgeted for $50 million, the EMPAC construction costs ballooned to over $200 million due to difficulty of anchoring the foundation in the soft clay of the hill.

In 2008, RPI announced the purchase of the former Rensselaer Best Western Inn, located at the base of the hill, along with plans to transform it into a new residence hall. After extensive renovations, the residence hall was dedicated on 15 May 2009, as the Howard N. Blitman, P.E. '50 Residence Commons. It houses about 300 students in 148 rooms and includes a fitness center, dining hall, and conference area. The new residence hall is part of a growing initiative to involve students in the Troy community and help revitalize the downtown. RPI owns and operates three office buildings in downtown Troy, the Rice and Heley buildings and the historic W. & L.E. Gurley Building. RPI also owns the Proctor's Theater building in Troy, which was purchased in 2004, with the intention of converting it into office space. As of 2011, Rensselaer had signed an agreement with Columbia Development Companies to acquire both Proctor's Theatre and Chasan Building in Troy and launch a redevelopment.

=== Other campuses and online programs ===
The institute ran a 15-acre (6.1 ha) campus in Hartford, Connecticut, and a distance learning center in Groton, Connecticut, the latter of which was closed in 2018. The Hartford campus was sold in 2023. These centers were used by graduates and working professionals and are now managed by the online branch of RPI, Rensselaer at Work which offers graduate degrees in business, computer science, and engineering. There are also certificate programs and skills training programs for working professionals.

== Academics ==
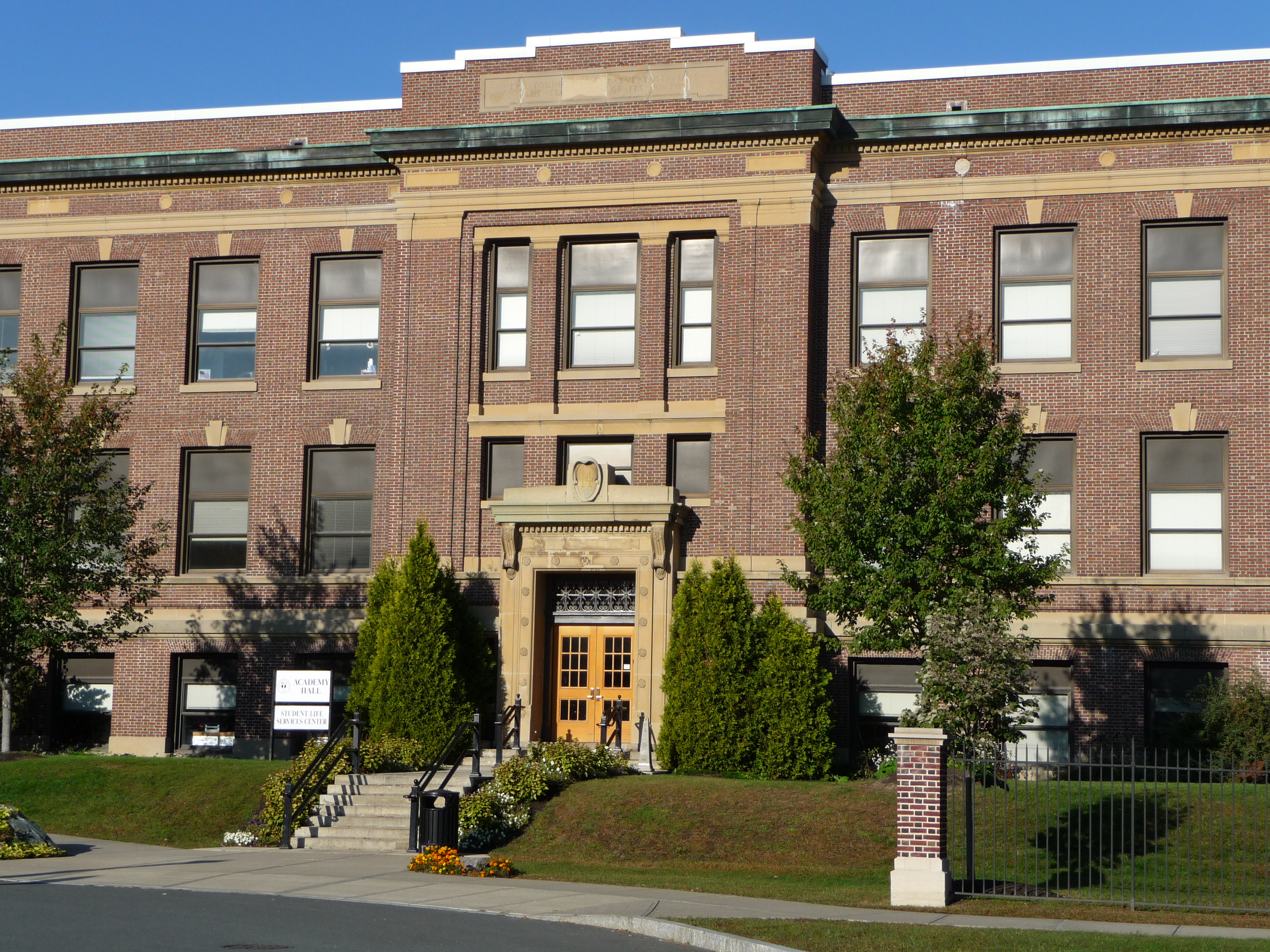
Academy Hall

Rensselaer Polytechnic Institute has five schools: the School of Architecture, the School of Engineering, the School of Humanities, Arts, and Social Sciences, the Lally School of Management & Technology, and the School of Science. The School of Engineering is the largest by enrollment, followed by the School of Science, the School of Management, the School of Humanities, Arts, and Social Sciences, and the School of Architecture. There also exists an interdisciplinary program in Information Technology that began in the late 1990s, programs in prehealth and prelaw, Reserve Officers' Training Corps (ROTC) for students desiring commissions as officers in the armed forces, a program in cooperative education (Co-Op), and domestic and international exchange programs. Altogether, the university offers over 145 programs in nearly 60 fields that lead to bachelor's, master's, and doctoral degrees. In addition to traditional majors, RPI has around a dozen special interdisciplinary programs, such as Games and Simulation Arts and Sciences (GSAS), Design, Innovation, and Society (DIS), Minds & Machines, and Product Design and Innovation (PDI). RPI is a technology-oriented university; all buildings and residence hall rooms have hard-wired and wireless high speed internet access, and all incoming freshmen have been required to have a laptop computer since 1999.

=== Rensselaer Plan ===
With the arrival of President Shirley Ann Jackson came the "Rensselaer Plan", announced in 1999. Its goal is to achieve greater prominence for Rensselaer as a technological research university. Various aspects of the plan include bringing in a larger graduate student population and new research faculty, and increasing participation in undergraduate research, international exchange programs, and "living and learning communities". So far, there have been a number of changes under the plan: new infrastructure such as the Center for Biotechnology and Interdisciplinary Studies, Experimental Media and Performing Arts Center, and Computational Center for Nanotechnology Innovations (CCNI) have been built to support new programs, and application numbers have increased. In 2018, Rensselaer received a record number of applications: 20,337. According to Jared Cohon in 2006, then-president of Carnegie Mellon University, "Change at Rensselaer in the last five years has occurred with a scope and swiftness that may be without precedent in the recent history of American higher education."

The university set an initial goal of $100 million annually. Fourteen years later, in FY2013, research expenditures reached this goal. To help raise money, the university mounted a $1 billion capital campaign with a public phase that began in September 2004 and was expected to finish by 2008. In 2001, a major milestone of the campaign was the pledging of an unrestricted gift of $360 million by an anonymous donor, believed to be the largest such gift to a U.S. university at the time. The university had been a relative stranger to such generosity as the prior largest single gift was $15 million. By September 2006, the $1 billion goal has been exceeded much in part to an in-kind contribution of software commercially valued at $513.95 million by the Partners for the Advancement of Collaborative Engineering Education (PACE). In light of this, the board of trustees increased the goal of the $1 billion capital campaign to $1.4 billion by June 30, 2009. The new goal was met by October 1, 2008.

In anticipation of RPI's 200th anniversary, an updated version called the "Rensselaer Plan 2024" was announced in 2012.

In 2016, Jackson announced during the Fall Town Hall Meeting that the institute was in the final stages of organizing a new capital campaign which it would launch in 2017 to meet the goals of the Rensselaer Plan 2024. The goal of the campaign was cited as being primarily for the support of financial aid for undergraduate students and the expansion of on-campus research facilities to accommodate planned increases in doctoral and graduate enrollment. The fundraising goal of the capital campaign was $1 billion, with over $400 million raised prior to the campaign going public.

Ambitious spending on the Rensselaer Plan has led the university into financial difficulties, with its credit rating lowered by several agencies.

=== Rankings ===
Academic rankings

National
- Forbes: 124
- U.S. News & World Report: 51
- Washington Monthly: 117
- WSJ/College Pulse: 101

Global
- ARWU: 501–600
- QS: 695
- THE: 601–800
- U.S. News & World Report: 1,090

In 2022, RPI was ranked by U.S. News & World Report in the top ten national universities for highest starting salary. In 2023, graduates had a median salary (early career) of $105,367. For 2023, U.S. News & World Report ranked Rensselaer #51 among national universities in the U.S., and #46 for "Most Innovative Schools". The same rankings placed Rensselaer's undergraduate engineering program tied at 32nd among schools whose highest degree is a doctorate, and its graduate program is ranked tied for 43rd out of 218 engineering schools.

In 2024, Washington Monthly ranked RPI 117th among 438 national universities in the U.S. based on RPI's contribution to the public good, as measured by social mobility, research, and promoting public service.

The Leiden Ranking (2016) placed RPI at 127 among the top 900 world universities and research institutions according to the proportion of the top 1% most frequently cited publications of a university. In 2016, The Economist ranked Rensselaer No. 18 among four-year non-vocational colleges and universities and Times Higher Education–QS World University Rankings placed Rensselaer among the top 50 universities for technology in the world. In 2016, Rensselaer was listed among the top ten universities for highest median earnings.

Civil liberties organization FIRE gave RPI its 2020 "Lifetime Censorship Award" "For its unashamed, years-long record of censoring its critics and utter disinterest in protecting students’ rights".

=== Electrical and computer systems engineering at RPI ===
One of the major departments at RPI is the ECSE department, or Electrical and Computer Systems Engineering department. The department offers students the ability to gain bachelors, masters, and doctoral degrees in electrical engineering, or computer systems engineering. While the school itself was founded in 1824, electrical engineering was first introduced to Rensselaer Polytechnic in 1907 with the class of 1911, long before the invention of the first computers but twenty-eight years after the invention of the lightbulb. The department was listed as Physics and Electrical Engineering in 1924 while under President Palmer Ricketts. Computer system engineering was added later. Today computer systems engineering and electrical engineering are in many ways similar, with many of the core classes being shared between the two. Electrical engineering, however tends to focus more on hardware, while computer systems engineering tends to focus on algorithms and systems. Many students take dual majors, the common ones being electrical engineering and computer systems engineering, electrical engineering and mechanic engineering, electrical engineering and applied physics, and computer systems engineering and computer science. Many students in the ECSE department often do minors in other fields such as economics or psychology. The ECSE department currently does research in the areas of information science and systems, communication and network, control and autonomy, energy and power systems, electronics and photonics, and computer systems design. Notable alumni from the ECSE department include James A. Parsons, B. Jayant Baliga, Alan Borck, founder of RLC Electronics, Bruce Carlson, Mukesh Chatter, Allen B. Du Mont, Nariman Farvardin, Peter Hart, inventor of the A* search algorithm, Herman A. Haus, Marcian E. Hoff, creator of the microprocessor, Doug Mercer, who was influential in the field of analog to digital converters, Sean O’Sullivan, Curtis P. Priem, founder of NVIDIA, George Saridis, Steven J. Sassoon, inventor of digital camera, Chauncey Starr, Raymond S. Tomlinson, inventor of e-mail, and Eitan Yudilevich.

== Research and development ==
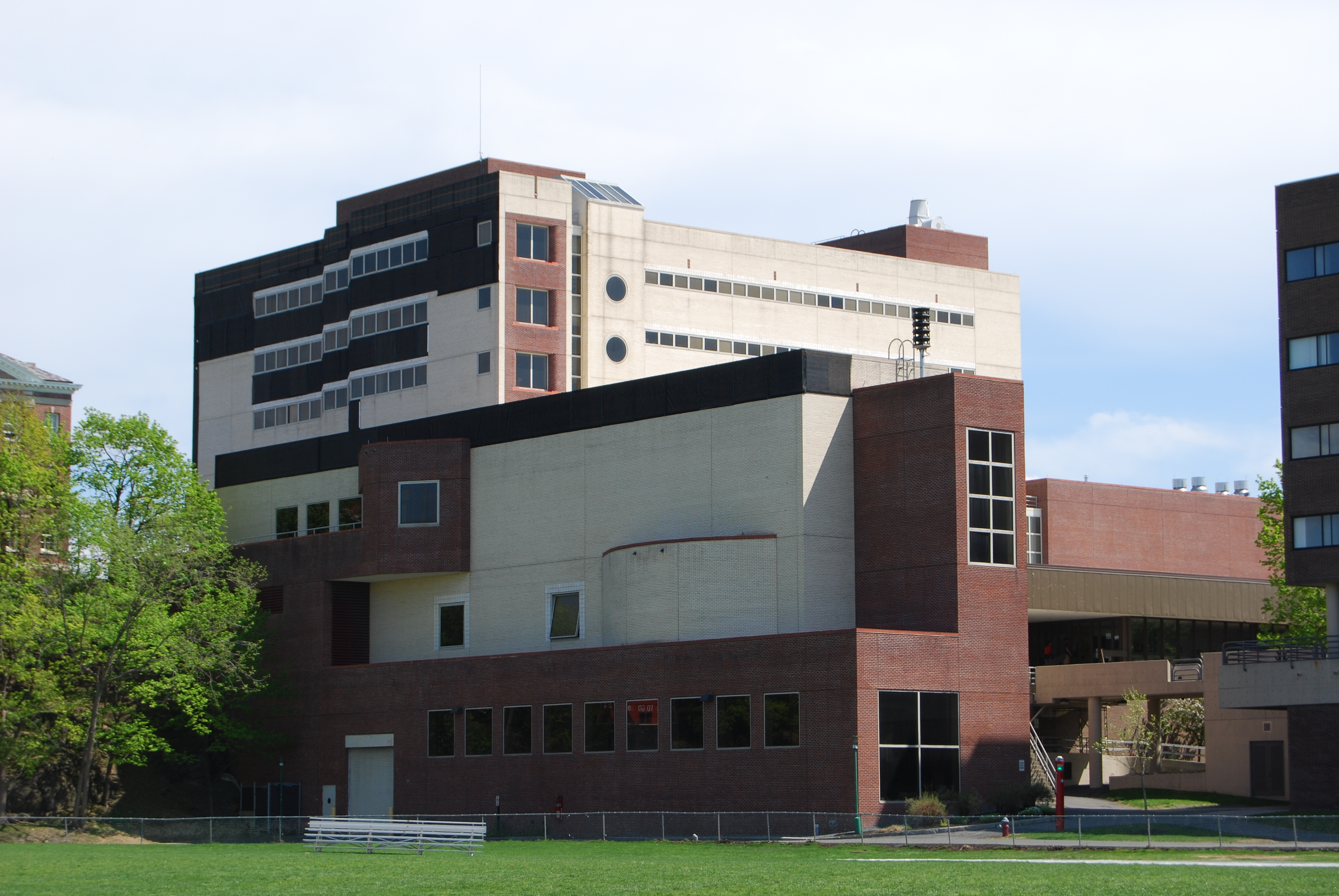
The Low Center for Industrial Innovation, northeast hub of the Smart Manufacturing Innovation Institute

Rensselaer is classified among "R1: Doctoral Universities – Very High Research Activity". Rensselaer has established six areas of research as institute priorities: biotechnology, energy and the environment, nanotechnology, computation and information technology, and media and the arts. Research is organized under the Office of the Vice President for Research, Jonathan Dordick. In 2018, Rensselaer operated 34 research centers and maintained annual sponsored research expenditures of $100.8 million.

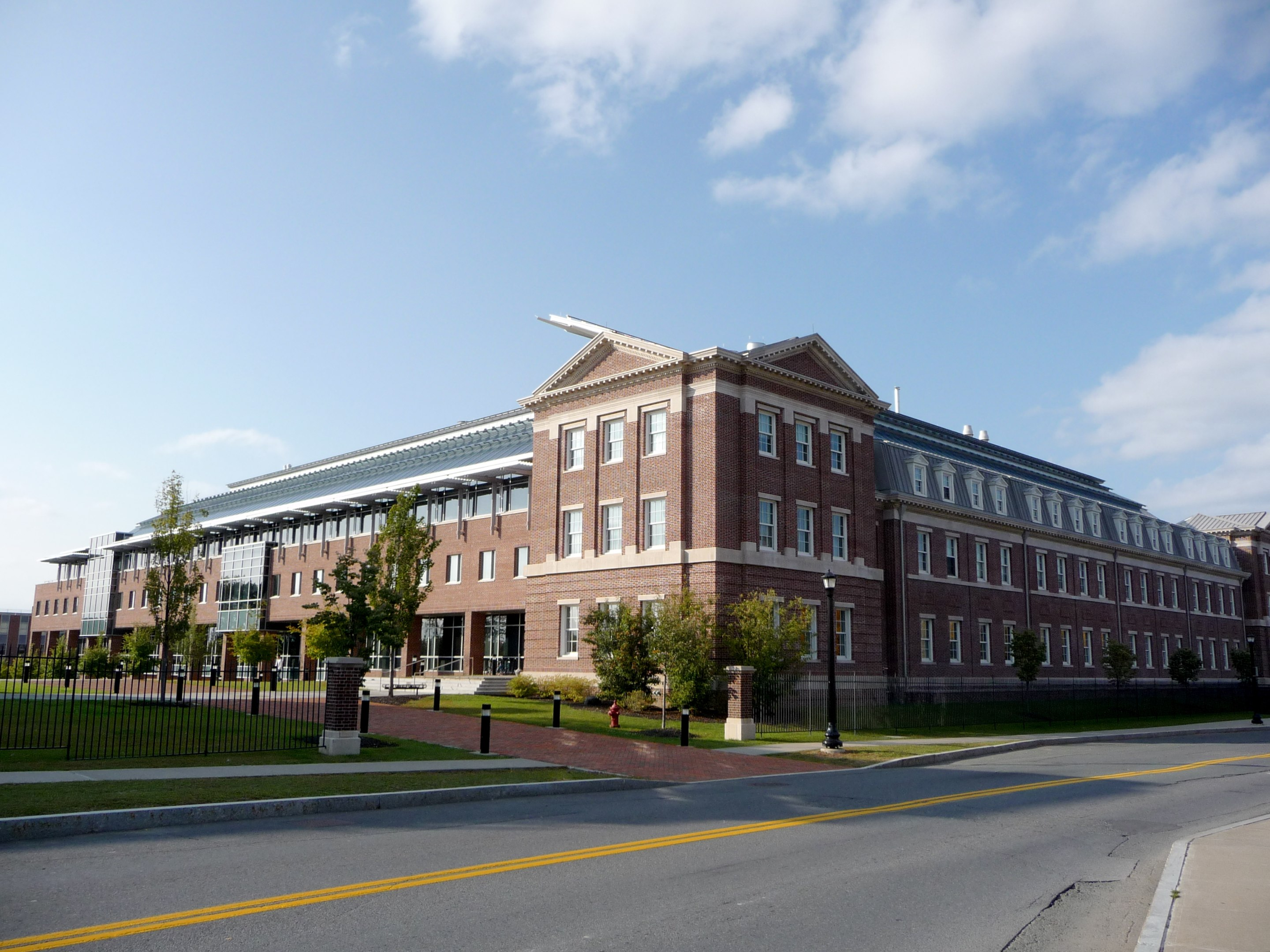
Center for Biotechnology and Interdisciplinary Studies

One of the most recent of Rensselaer's research centers is the Center for Biotechnology and Interdisciplinary Studies, a 218,000 square-foot research facility for fundamental and applied research in biotechnology. The primary target of the research center is biologics, a research priority based on data-driven understanding of proteomics, protein regulation, and gene regulation. It involves using biocatalysis and synthetic biology tools to block or supplement the actions of specific cells or proteins in the immune system. Over the past decade, CBIS has produced over 2,000 peer-reviewed publications with over 30,000 citations and currently employs over 200 scientists and engineers. The center is used primarily to train undergraduate and graduate students, with over 1,000 undergraduates and 200 doctoral students trained. The center has numerous academic and industry partners, including the Icahn School of Medicine at Mount Sinai. These partnerships have resulted in numerous advances over the last decade through new commercial developments in diagnostics, therapeutics, medical devices, and regenerative medicine which are a direct result of research at the center. Examples of advancements include the creation of synthetic heparin, antimicrobial coatings, detoxification chemotherapy, on-demand biomedicine, implantable sensors, and 3D cellular array chips.

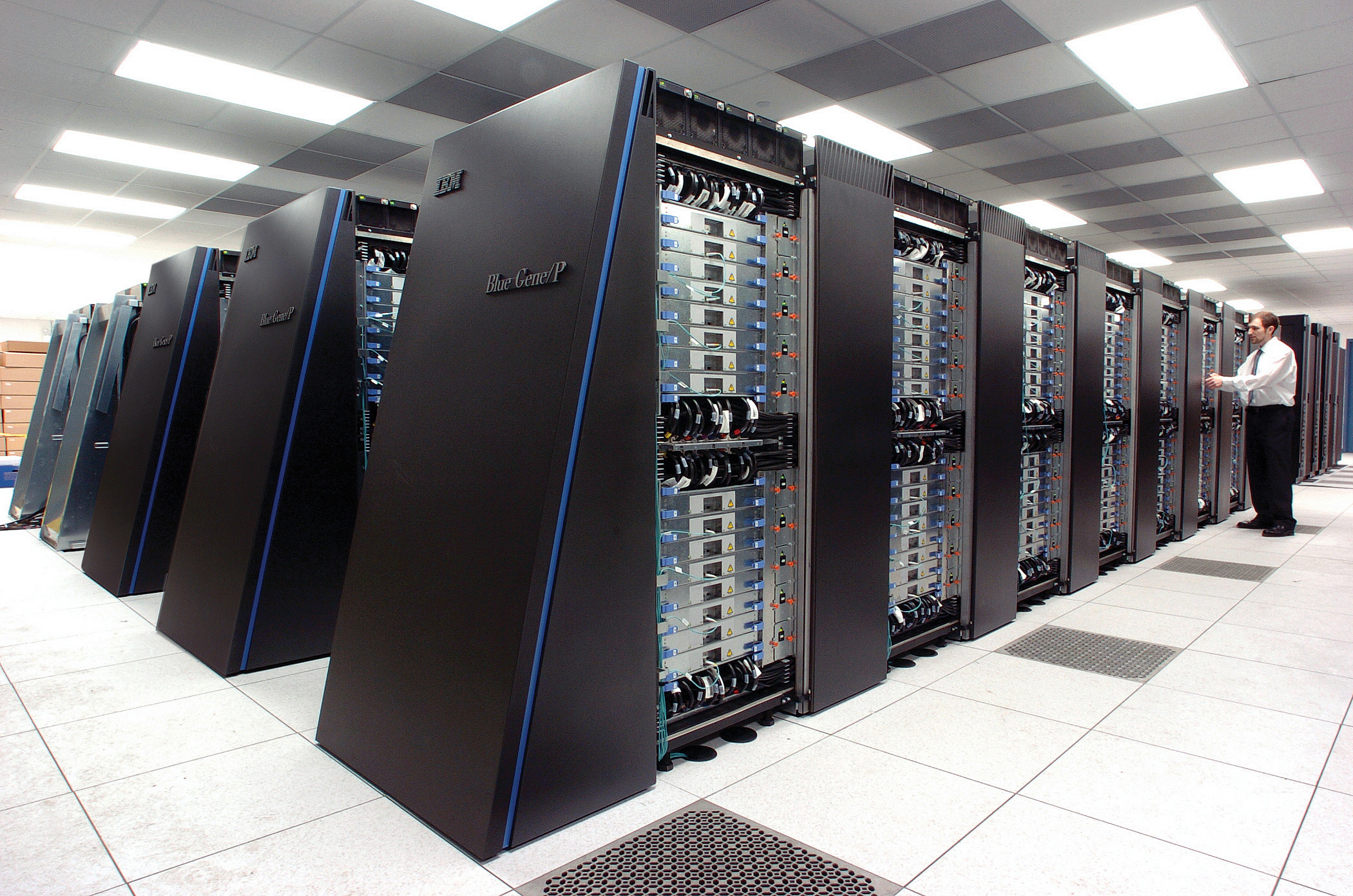
A Blue Gene/P supercomputer similar to Rensselaer's Center for Computational Innovations

Rensselaer also hosts the Tetherless World Constellation, a multidisciplinary research institution focused on theories, methods, and applications of the World Wide Web. Research is carried out in three inter-connected themes: Future Web, Semantic Foundations and Xinformatics. At Rensselaer, a constellation is a multidisciplinary team composed of senior and junior faculty members, research scientists, and postdoctoral, graduate, and undergraduate students. The faculty experts for the TWC constellation are James Hendler, Deborah McGuinness and Peter Fox. Faculty alumni of TWC includes Heng Ji (Natural Language Processing). In 2016, the Constellation received a one million dollar grant from the Bill & Melinda Gates Foundation for continuing work on a novel data visualization platform that will harness and accelerate the analysis of vast amounts of data for the foundation's Healthy Birth, Growth, and Development Knowledge Integration initiative.

In conjunction with the constellation, Rensselaer operates the Center for Computational Innovations which is the result of a $100 million collaboration between Rensselaer, IBM, and New York State to further nanotechnology innovations. The center is currently home to the most powerful private-university based supercomputer in the world and its supercomputer is consistently ranked among the most powerful in the world, capable of performing over 1.1 peta-FLOPS. The center's main focus is on reducing the cost associated with the development of nanoscale materials and devices, such as those used in the semiconductor industry. The university also utilizes the center for interdisciplinary research in biotechnology, medicine, energy, and other fields. Rensselaer operates a nuclear reactor and testing facility–the only university-run reactor in New York State–as well as the Gaerttner Linear Accelerator, which is currently being upgraded under a $9.44 million grant from the US Department of Energy.

In 2024, Rensselaer, in partnership with IBM, unveiled a new quantum computer on campus, aiming to further quantum computer research for both the university and the New York State area.

Starting December 15th, 2024, Rensselaer unveiled their new intellectual property policy, which granted more freedoms to undergraduates and researchers who use Rensselaer facilities to retain ownership of their work. This came after professor Chulsung Bae sued the school, citing that they licensed his patents to another business.

== Student life ==
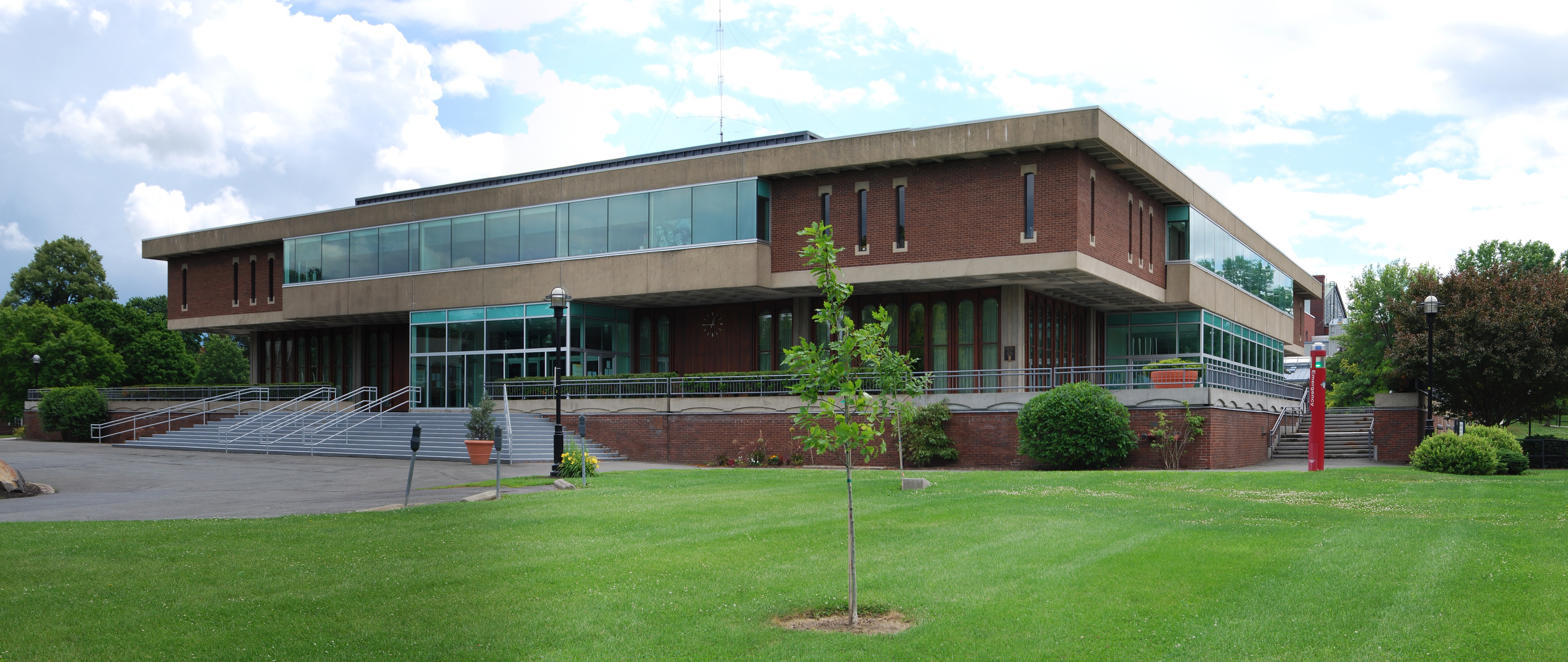
Student Union

The students of RPI have created and participate in a variety of clubs and organizations funded by the Student Union. About 170 of these organizations are funded by the Student Union, while another thirty, which consist mostly of political and religious organizations, are self-supporting. In 2006 the Princeton Review ranked RPI second for "more to do on campus." The Union was the last entirely student-run union at a private university in the United States until September 2017.

=== Student organizations ===
Phalanx is RPI's Senior Honor Society. It was founded in 1912, when Edward Dion and the Student Council organized a society to recognize those RPI students who had distinguished themselves among their peers in the areas of leadership, service and devotion to the alma mater. It is a fellowship of the most active in student activities and has inducted more than 1,500 members since its founding.

RPI has around twenty intramural sports organizations, many of which are broken down into different divisions based on level of play. Greek organizations compete in them as well as independent athletes. There are also thirty-nine club sports.

Given the university's proximity to the Berkshires, Green Mountains and Adirondacks, the Ski Club and the Outing Club are some of the largest groups on campus. The Ski Club offers weekly trips to local ski areas during the winter months, while the Outing Club offers trips on a weekly basis for a variety of activities.

The Rensselaer Polytechnic is the student-run weekly newspaper. The Poly printed about 7,000 copies each week and distributed them around campus until 2018 when the newspaper switched to online-only distribution due to budget concerns. Although it is the Union club with the largest budget, The Poly receives no subsidy from the Union and obtains all funding through the sale of advertisements. There is also a popular student-run magazine called Statler & Waldorf which prints on a semesterly basis.

RPI has an improvisational comedy group, Sheer Idiocy, which performs several shows a semester. There are also several music groups ranging from a cappella groups such as the rusty pipes, Partial Credit, the Rensselyrics and Duly Noted, to several instrumental groups such as the orchestra, the jazz band and a classical choral group, the Rensselaer Concert Choir.

Another notable organization on campus is WRPI, the campus radio station. WRPI differs from most college radio in that it serves a 75-mile (121 km) radius including the greater Albany area. With 10 kW of broadcasting power, WRPI maintains a stronger signal than nearly all college radio stations and some commercial stations. WRPI currently broadcasts on 91.5 FM in the Albany area.

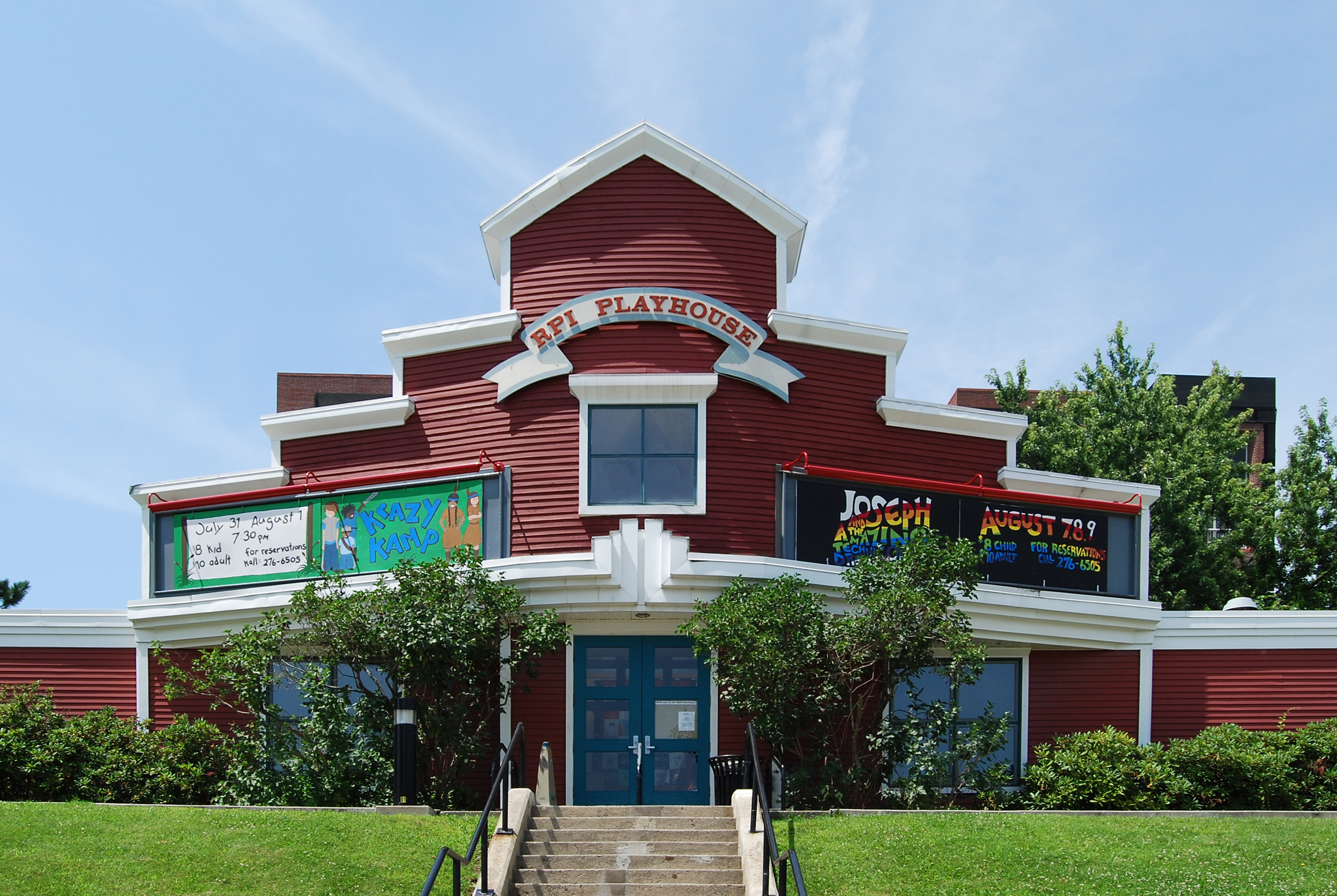
The RPI Playhouse

The RPI Players is an on‑campus theater group that was formed in 1929. The Players resided in the Old Gym until 1965 when they moved to their present location at the 15th Street Lounge. This distinctive red shingled building had been a USO hall for the U.S. Army before being purchased by RPI. However, the building is currently closed to the public due to flood damage caused by a burst pipe in February 2023. The Players have staged over 300 productions in its history.

=== RPI songs ===
There are a number of songs commonly played and sung at RPI events. Notable among them are:

- "The Alma Mater (Here's to Old RPI)" – sung at formal events such as commencement and convocation, also played and sung by the Pep Band at hockey and football games, and played daily at noon by the quadrangle bell tower. It was published in the first book of Songs of Rensselaer printed in 1913.
- "Hail, Dear Old Rensselaer" – used to be the fight song during the 1960s. It is still played today by the Pep Band at athletic events.
- "All We've Learned at Rensselaer" – sung at the RPI commencement ceremonies by the Rensselyrics. Although the Rensselyrics are an a cappella group, this song is accompanied by piano. Each verse or section has a different musical style, several of which are closely based on Billy Joel songs or other popular songs.

=== First Year Experience and CLASS programs ===
Another notable aspect of student life at RPI is the "First-Year Experience" (FYE) program. Freshman begin their stay at RPI with a week called "Navigating Rensselaer and Beyond" or NRB week. The Office of the First-Year Experience provides several programs that extend to not only freshman, but to all students. These include family weekend, community service days, the Information and Personal Assistance Center (IPAC), and the Community Advocate Program. The FYE program was awarded the 2006 NASPA Excellence Gold Award, in the category of "Enrollment Management, Orientation, Parents, First-Year, Other-Year and related".

Starting in 2008, the Division of Student Life updated the structure of its residential college model based upon the concept of "Clustered Learning Advocacy and Support for Students" (CLASS), which included a planned requirement for all sophomores to live on campus and to live with special "residence cluster deans". The transition to this program began in early 2010 among some resistance from some fraternities and students who had planned to live off campus.

=== NROTC ===
RPI Naval Reserve Officers Training Corps is an officer accession program hosted at RPI with the goal of developing Midshipmen into commissioned officers into the United States Navy and Marine Corps. The unit consists of students from RPI as well as Union College. The program was officially started at RPI in September 1941, just a few months before the US involvement in WWII. RPI NROTC was part of the V-12 training program that was aimed at increasing the number of total commissioned officers during WWII. It focused on developing officers for the military specializing in technical degrees such as engineering, medicine, and foreign languages. The RPI class of 1945 had a large majority of its student body in the NROTC program with around 70% of the 932 students.

Since 1926, over 75 Naval Officers have attained flag officer rank with a degree from RPI. Besides the US Naval Academy, this is the largest number of flag officers produced from one single institute. RPI NROTC is home to several notable alumni including NASA Astronaut Reid Wiseman and RDML Lewis Combs. RDML Combs is the founder of the Navy Construction Battalion, commonly referred to as the "Seabees," which plays a crucial role in creating forward deployed bases as well as humanitarian efforts to bring fresh water to underdeveloped communities.

=== Grand Marshal and President of the Union ===
The positions of grand marshal and president of the union at Rensselaer Polytechnic Institute are typically awarded (by student vote) to the students who are respected by the student body and are represented by a top hat and a derby hat, respectively. While Rensselaer Polytechnic Institute has had the position of Grand Marshal (GM) since 1865, the position of president of the union did not come about until 1890 when the union was developed. However, between 1890 and 1894, there was only a president of the union, no grand marshal. Starting with the 1894–1895 school year, the President of the Union and Grand Marshal ran side by side. The week of voting for said positions is called GM Week, and typically has events on campus for students to do to promote the voting.

The grand marshal position is elected by the student body (typically in the spring) and is the highest position a student can hold at RPI. The GM plays a big role in the student government by doing projects, appointing officers, and aiding the general campus community. The first GM was Albert M. Harper.

The president of the union is elected by the student body (typically in the spring). Their main responsibility is to appoint an executive board of 15–20 students (responsible for the Rensselaer Union's budget). The executive board is the chief financial body of the Rensselaer Union. They are responsible for preparing and approving the budget for the following fiscal year, keeping track of and distributing union funds, and managing the business affairs with other facilities. In addition to appointing the executive board, they also work closely with the union's staff, athletics staff, and student clubs. The first PU was W.C.H. Slagle.

=== Greek life ===
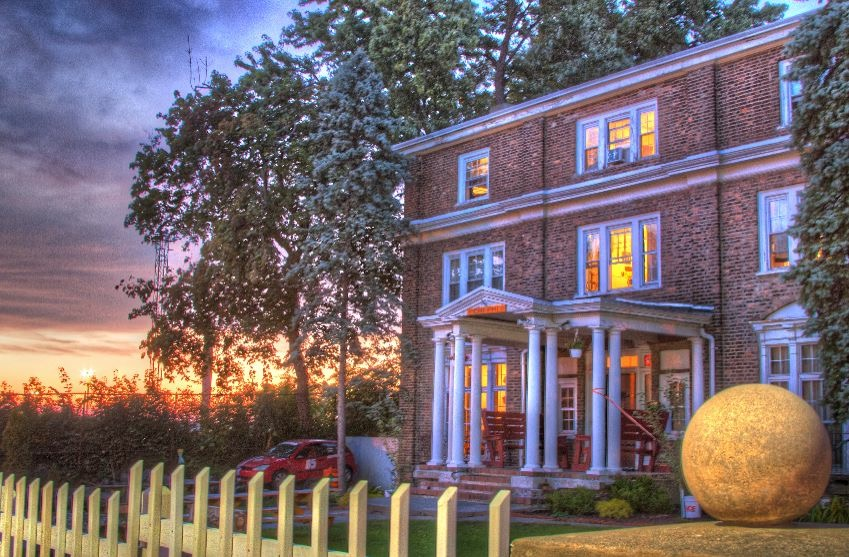
The Theta Chapter of Chi Phi at Rensselaer Polytechnic Institute

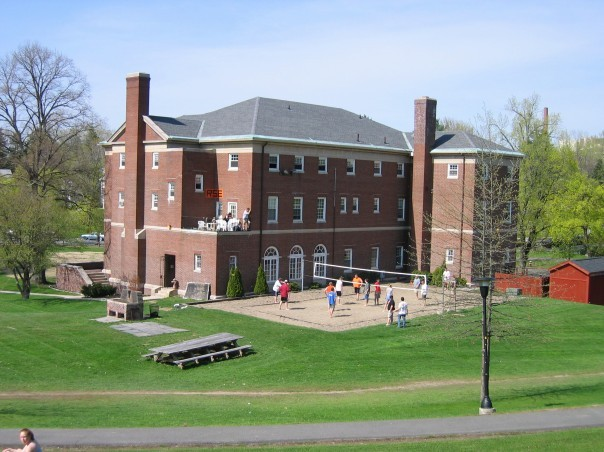
The RSE Clubhouse from the South Side near the "Freshman Hill" dorms

Rensselaer Polytechnic Institute has an extensive history of Greek community involvement on campus, including past presidents, honorary academic building dedications, and philanthropic achievements. The overall Greek system at Rensselaer stresses Leadership, Fortitude, Innovation, and Evolution. RPI currently has 29 active fraternities as well as 6 sororities, with 32 percent involvement of all males and 18 percent involvement of all females, organized under the Interfraternal Council and Panhellenic Council. Of those Greek organizations, three were founded at Rensselaer including the Theta Xi national fraternity, the Sigma Delta Hispanic-interest local sorority, and the Rensselaer Society of Engineers local engineering fraternity. Theta Xi fraternity was established by RPI students on 29 April 1864, the only national fraternity founded during the Civil War. The Theta Xi Fraternity Chapter House is listed on the National Register of Historic Places. Additionally, Rensselaer is home to the Epsilon Zeta chapter of the Alpha Phi Omega, or "APO," national service fraternity, which operates a test-bank and office at the top floor of the Student Union. The organization also hosts a campus lost & found, universal can tab collection, and a public 3D printing service.

In 2017, Chi Phi and Theta Chi at Rensselaer co-hosted an event called "Brave A Shave For Kids With Cancer," along with several other Greek organizations - raising over $22,000 for pediatric cancer research with dozens of participants shaving their heads to spread awareness of pediatric cancers. Many fraternities and sororities also engage in Adopt-a-Highway and host events in the local community. Since its inception, all members of Greek Life have also participated in Navigating Rensselaer & Beyond - RPI's official continuation of student orientation through hosting annual events open to all students such as Beach Day/Hike with Greek Life, a day of hiking and team building activities for incoming freshmen, and Saratoga Therapeutic Equine Program, a day of service focused on horse rehabilitation programs.

Greek Life organizations also operate Greek-affiliated groups including the Alumni Inter-Greek Council, Greek Greeks - a student-run venture which aims to promote sustainability and safe environmental practices in Greek chapter houses, Greek Spectrum - an LGBTQIA support and advocacy group, and the undergraduate Greek leadership society Order of Omega.

== Student body ==
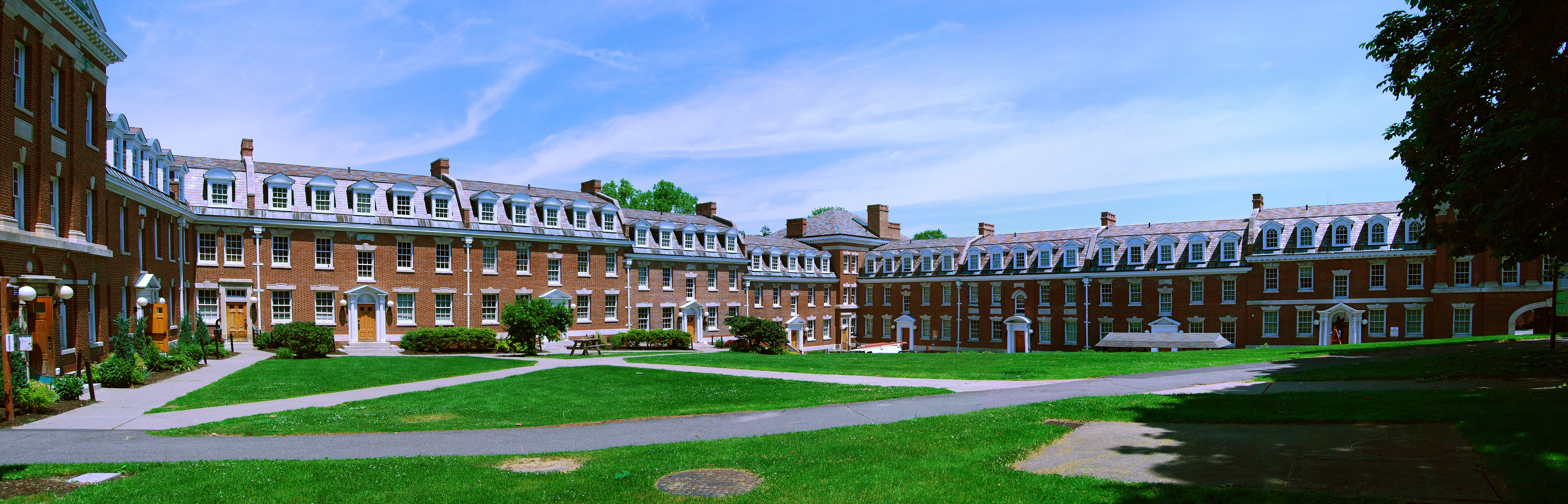
Rensselaer's Quadrangle dormitory on the central campus

In 2018, Rensselaer's enrollment was 7,442 total resident students, including 6,590 undergraduate and 1,329 graduate. Over 71% of Rensselaer's students are from out of state. More than 20% of students are international. Rensselaer students represent all 50 U.S. states and over 60 countries. The undergraduate student to faculty ratio is 13:1. Among the class of 2020, 66% are in the top 5 percent of their high school class, 93% in the top quarter, and 99% in the top half. The average unweighted high school GPA for enrolled students was 3.88 on a 4.0 scale, with 65% having a 3.75 GPA or higher and 99% having at least a 3.0.

Rensselaer's yield rate for the Class of 2021 surpassed 20 percent in the year 2018 with over 20,000 applications received by Rensselaer's Office of Admissions. The average SAT score range was 1330–1500 for the mid-50% range with a median SAT score of 1420 on a scale of 1600. The average ACT score range was 29–33 for the mid-50% range with a median ACT score of 31. In 2016, Rensselaer's freshman retention rate was 94% and admissions selectivity rating was 35th in the nation according to U.S. News & World Report. Since 2000, undergraduate enrollment grew by over 1,700 students, from 4,867 to 6,590 during calendar year 2018, and the full-time graduate enrollment declined from 1500 to 1,188.

Roughly 12% of students received the Rensselaer medal, a merit scholarship with a cumulative value of $100,000 for exceptional high school students in science and mathematics. 95% of full-time domestic undergraduate students receive either need-based or merit-based financial aid, averaging 85% of total financial need met per student. In 2018, Rensselaer invested over $140 million in financial aid and scholarships for students.

=== Gender ratio ===
RPI became coeducational in 1942. In 1966, the male-to-female ratio was 19:1, in the 1980s it reached as low as 8:1, and in the early 1990s the ratio was around 5:1. In 2009, RPI had a ratio of 2.5:1 (72% male / 28% female), In 2016, the ratio for the incoming freshman class had fallen to 2.1:1 (68% male / 32% female), the lowest in the history of the institute. In the fall of 2016, more than 1,000 women enrolled in Rensselaer Polytechnic Institute's undergraduate engineering programs for the first time in its history. These women represented 30 percent of the student body in engineering at the university, and 32 percent of the university's total gender composition. Shekhar Garde, Rensselaer's dean of engineering, claims he wants to increase the female composition of the institute to 50 percent before 2030.

== Athletics ==
Official athletics logo

The RPI Engineers are the athletic teams for the university. RPI currently sponsors 23 sports, 21 of which compete at the NCAA Division III level in the Liberty League; men's and women's ice hockey compete at the Division I level in ECAC Hockey. The official nickname of some of the school's Division III teams was changed in 1995 from the Engineers to the Red Hawks. However, the hockey, football, cross-country, tennis and track and field teams all chose to retain the Engineers name. The Red Hawks name was, at the time, very unpopular among the student body; a Red Hawk mascot was frequently taunted with thrown concessions and chants of "kill the chicken!". In 2009 the nickname for all teams has since been changed back to Engineers. In contrast, the official ice hockey mascot, known as Puckman, has always been very popular. Puckman is an anthropomorphic hockey puck with an engineer's helmet.

During the 1970s and 1980s, one RPI cheer was:

E to the x, dy/dx, E to the x, dx
Cosine, secant, tangent, sine
3.14159
Square root, cube root, log of pi
Disintegrate them, RPI!

=== Ice hockey (men's) ===
RPI has a competitive Division I hockey team who won NCAA national titles in 1954 and 1985. Depending on how the rules are interpreted, the RPI men's ice hockey team may have the longest winning streak on record for a Division I team; in the 1984–85 season it was undefeated for 30 games, but one game was against the University of Toronto, a non-NCAA team. Continuing into the 1985–86 season, RPI continued undefeated over 38 games, including two wins over Toronto. The streak ended at Boston University against the Terriers. Adam Oates and Daren Puppa, two players during that time, both went on to become stars in the NHL. Joé Juneau, who played from 1987 to 1991, and Brian Pothier, who played from 1996 to 2000, also spent many years in the NHL. Graeme Townshend, who also played in the late 1980s, had a brief NHL career. He is the first man of Jamaican ancestry to play in the National Hockey League.

The ice hockey team plays a significant role in the campus's culture, drawing thousands of fans each week to the Houston Field House during the season. The team's popularity even sparked the tradition of the hockey line, where students lined up for season tickets months in advance of the on-sale date. Today, the line generally begins a week or more before ticket sales. Another tradition since 1978 has been the "Big Red Freakout!" game held close to the first weekend of February. Fans usually dress in the school's colors red (cherry) and white, and gifts such as T-shirts are distributed en masse. In ice hockey, the RPI's biggest rival has always been the upstate engineering school Clarkson University. In recent years RPI has also developed a spirited rivalry with their conference travel partner Union College, with whom they annually play a nonconference game in Albany for the Mayor's Cup.

=== Ice hockey (women's) ===
The women's ice hockey team moved to the NCAA Division I level in 2005. During the 2008–09 season the team set the record for most wins in one season (19-14-4). On 28 February 2010, Rensselaer made NCAA history. The Engineers beat Quinnipiac, 2–1, but it took five overtimes. It is now the longest game in NCAA Women's Ice Hockey history. Senior defenseman Laura Gersten had the game-winning goal. She registered it at 4:32 of the fifth overtime session to not only clinch the win, but the series victory.

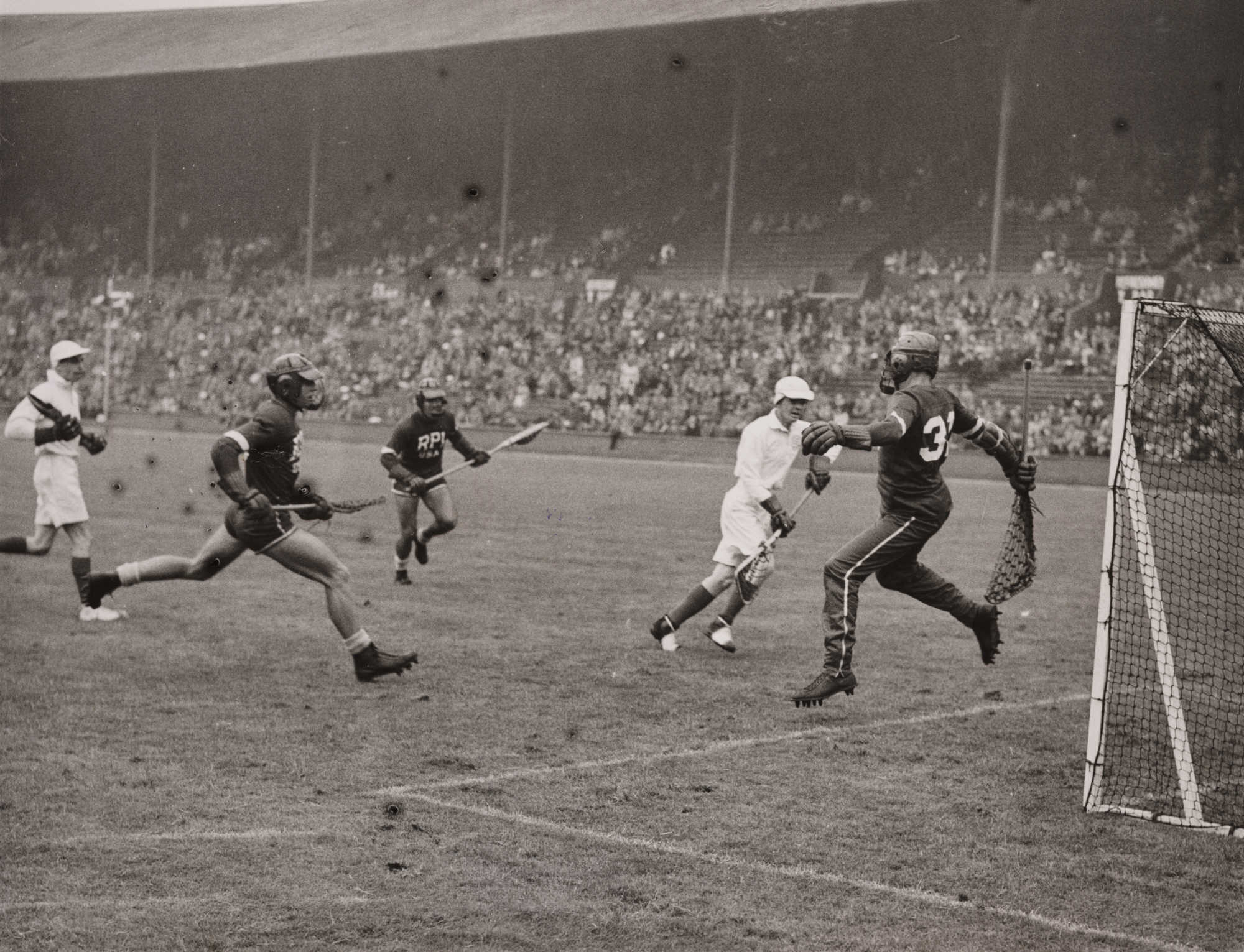
RPI's lacrosse team in a demonstration game at the 1948 London Olympics

=== Lacrosse (men's) ===
The lacrosse team represented the United States in the 1948 Olympics in London. It won the Wingate Memorial Trophy as national collegiate champions in 1952. Future NHL head coach Ned Harkness coached the lacrosse and ice hockey teams, winning national championships in both sports.

=== Baseball ===
The Engineers baseball squad is perennially atop the Liberty League standings and has seen 8 players move on to the professional ranks, including 4 players selected in the MLB draft. The team is coached by Jason Falcon. The Engineers play their home games at the historic Robison Field.

=== American football ===
American rugby was played on campus in the late 1870s. Intercollegiate football begin as late as 1886 when an RPI team first played a Union College team on a leased field in West Troy (Watervliet). Since 1903, RPI and nearby Union have been rivals in football, making it the oldest such rivalry in the state. The teams have played for the Dutchman's Shoes since 1950. RPI Football had their most successful season in 2003, when they finished 11–2 and lost to St. Johns (Minn.) in the NCAA Division III semifinal game.

=== Athletic facilities ===
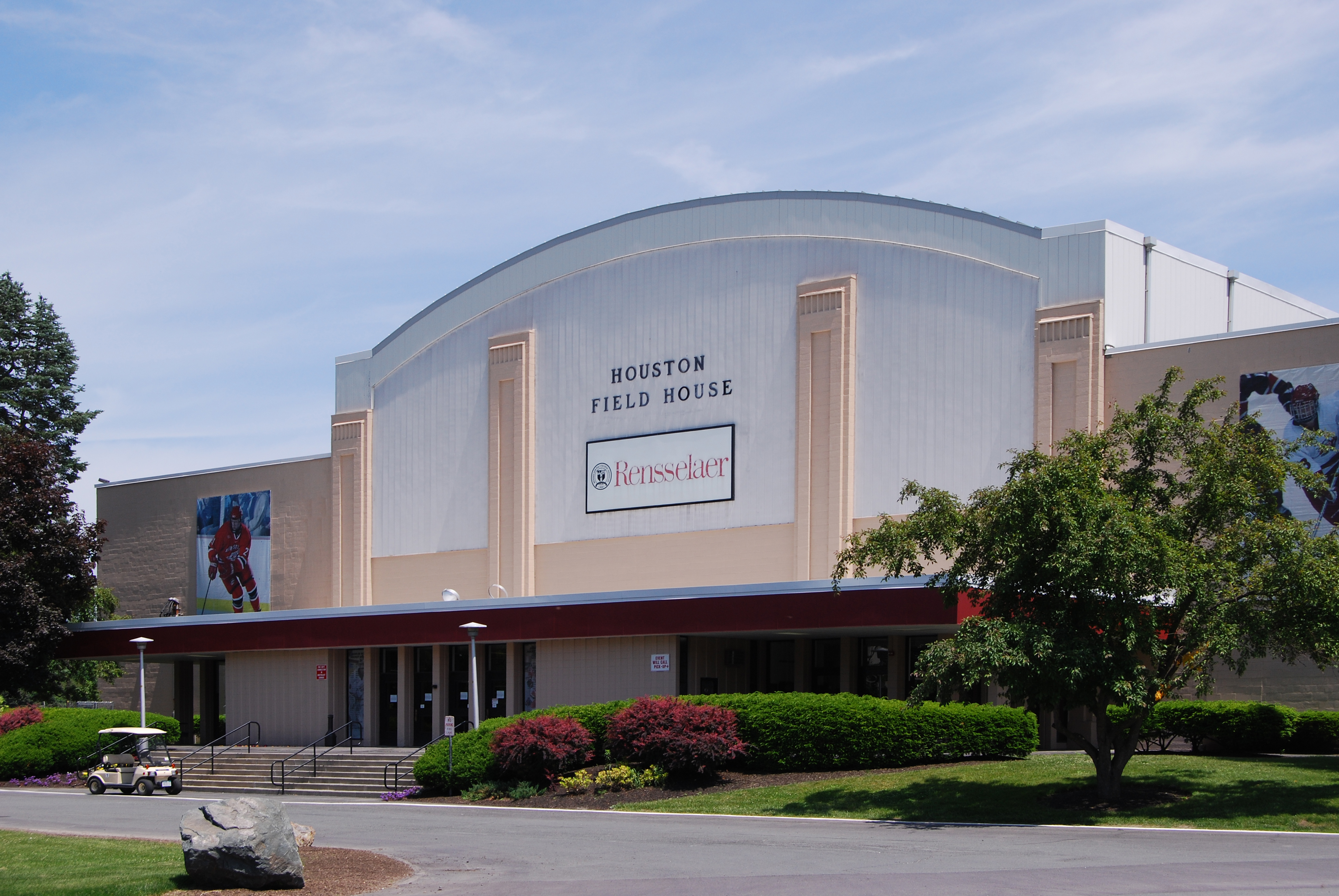
Houston Field House

The Houston Field House is a 4,780‑seat multi-purpose arena located on the RPI campus. It opened in 1949 and is home to the RPI Engineers men's and women's ice hockey teams. The Field House was renovated starting in 2007 as part of the major campus improvement project to build the East Campus Athletic Village. The renovations included locker rooms upgrades, addition of a new weight room, and a new special reception room dedicated to Ned Harkness. Additionally, as part of the renovations through a government grant, solar panels were installed on the roof to supply power to the building.

As part of the Rensselaer Plan, the institute recently completed a major project to improve its athletic facilities with the East Campus Athletic Village. The plan included construction of a new and much larger 4,842‑seat football stadium, a basketball arena with seating for 1,200, a new 50-meter pool, an indoor track and field complex, new tennis courts, new weight rooms and a new sports medicine center. The institute broke ground on 26 August 2007, and construction of the first phase is expected to last two years. The estimated cost of the project is $78 million for phase one and $35–$45 million for phase two. Since the completion of the new stadium, the bleachers on the Class of '86 football field on the central campus have been removed and the field has become an open space. In the future the new space could be used for expansions of the academic buildings, but for now members of the campus planning team foresee a "historic landscape with different paths and access ways for students and vehicles alike".

== History of women ==
Rensselaer Polytechnic Institute has historically been a male dominated institute. The first woman to apply to RPI applied in 1873, and her name was Elizabeth R. Bruswell. However, she did not attend as she was the only female to apply, and it was suggested that she would not be accepted as it would not be comfortable for her as the only woman on campus. For many years afterwards, the school continued to only allow admission to men. It was not until 1942 that women were welcome to enroll in classes at Rensselaer.

=== First women ===
==== Students ====
Camilla (Trent) Cluett (Architecture), Elizabeth English (Biology), Helen Ketchum (Architecture), Lois Graham (Mechanical Engineering), and Mary Ellen Rathbun (Metallurgical Engineering) were the first women to enroll in 1942. Lois Graham and Mary Ellen Rathbun became the first to graduate on April 22, 1945. In addition, Antoinette A. Patti was the first woman to receive a master's degree from RPI in February 1947, in Chemistry. The first Doctoral Degree received by a woman at RPI was Reva R. G. Servoss in June 1954, in Chemistry as well.

==== Faculty ====
Miss Hazel Brennan was the first woman assistant instructor in chemistry in 1918 and was officially the first woman instructor. The following year, 1919, Marie De Pierpont was hired as an instructor in French and was later named professor as well as being named head of the language department in 1928. She was the first woman to hold a full professorship at the institute and ended her position in 1932. It was not for another 11 years (1943) that another woman was hired as an instructor. Herta Leng, who worked in the Physics Department, was given the title of assistant professor in 1945, and became a full professor in 1966, the second woman to be a full professor at Rensselaer Polytechnic Institute.

While the percentage of women enrolled at RPI remains comparatively low, it has improved significantly over time. The ratio as of 2020 was about 32% women and 68% men.

== Notable alumni ==
According to the Rensselaer Alumni Association, there are nearly 100,000 RPI graduates living in the United States, and another 4,378 living abroad. In 1995, the Alumni Association created the Rensselaer Alumni Hall of Fame.

Several notable 19th-century civil engineers graduated from RPI. These include the visionary of the transcontinental railroad, Theodore Judah, Brooklyn Bridge engineer Washington Roebling, George Washington Gale Ferris Jr. (who designed and built the original Ferris Wheel) and Leffert L. Buck, the chief engineer of the Williamsburg Bridge in New York City.

Many RPI graduates have made important inventions, including Allen B. DuMont ('24), creator of the first commercial television and radar; Keith D. Millis ('38), inventor of ductile iron; Ted Hoff ('58), father of the microprocessor; Raymond Tomlinson ('63), often credited with the invention of e-mail; inventor of the digital camera Steven Sasson and Curtis Priem ('82), designer of the first graphics processor for the PC, and co-founder of NVIDIA. RPI Prof. Matthew Hunter invented a process to refine titanium in 1910. H. Joseph Gerber pioneered computer-automated manufacturing systems for industry.

In addition to NVIDIA, RPI graduates have also gone on to found or co-found major companies such as John Wiley and Sons, Texas Instruments, Fairchild Semiconductor, PSINet, MapInfo, Adelphia Communications, Level 3 Communications, Garmin, Bugle Boy, Vacasa, and Rivian. Several RPI graduates have played a part in the U.S. space program: George Low (B.Eng. 1948, M.S. 1950) was manager of the Apollo 11 project and served as president of RPI, and astronauts John L. Swigert Jr. (Apollo 13 pilot), Richard Mastracchio, Reid Wiseman (International Space Station veteran and commander of the 2026 Artemis II Moon mission), and space tourist Dennis Tito are alumni. The Electric Power Research Institute (EPRI) was founded by Dr. Chauncey Starr who graduated from RPI with a PhD in physics in 1935.

Political figures who graduated from RPI included federal judge Arthur J. Gajarsa (B.S. 1962), and Major General Thomas Farrell of the Manhattan Project. Edward Burton Hughes, the Acting Commissioner of New York State Department of Transportation in 1969, Executive Deputy Commissioner of New York State Department of Transportation from 1967 to 1970, and Deputy Superintendent of New York State Department of Public Works from 1952 to 1967. Bertram Dalley Tallamy, seventh Federal Highway Administrator under the Federal Aid Highway Act of 1956, in office from February 5, 1957 – January 20, 1961. DARPA director Tony Tether, Representative John Olver of Massachusetts's 1st congressional district, and Senators John Barrasso of Wyoming, Mark Shepard of Vermont, and George R. Dennis of Maryland, Prime Minister Hani Al-Mulki of Jordan.

Notable ice hockey players include NHL Hockey Hall of Famer and five-time NHL All Star Adam Oates (1985), Stanley Cup winner and former NHL All Star Mike McPhee (1982), two-time Calder Cup winner Neil Little (1994), former NHL All Rookie Joé Juneau (1991), and former NHL All Star Daren Puppa (1985).

Other notable alumni include 1973 Nobel Prize in Physics winner Ivar Giaever (Ph.D. 1964); the first African American woman to become a thoracic surgeon, Rosalyn Scott (B.S. 1970); director of Linux International Jon Hall (M.S. 1977); NCAA president Myles Brand (B.S. 1964); Lois Graham (B.S.ME 1946), who was the first woman to receive a degree in engineering from RPI, and went on to become the first woman in the US to receive a PhD in engineering; adult stem cell pioneer James Fallon; Michael D. West, gerontologist and stem cell scientist, founder of Geron, now CEO of BioTime (1976); director Bobby Farrelly (1981), David Ferrucci, lead researcher on IBM's Watson/Jeopardy! project; 66th AIA Gold Medal-winning architect Peter Q Bohlin; Matt Patricia, former head coach for the Detroit Lions; Luis Acuña (Politician), Governor of the Venezuelan Sucre State and former Minister of Universities; Andrew Franks, former placekicker for the Miami Dolphins of the National Football League; Sean Conroy, the first openly gay professional baseball player; Prem Jain (Father of Green Buildings in India); Keith Raniere, an American felon and the founder of NXIVM, a multi-level marketing company and cult.

== See also ==
- Association of Independent Technological Universities
