= Center for Computational Innovations =

Coordinates: 42.68051°N 73.69735°W

The Center for Computational Innovations (CCI), (formerly the Computational Center for Nanotechnology Innovations) is a supercomputing center located at the Rensselaer Technology Park in Troy, New York.

== Motivation ==
The center is the result of a $100 million collaboration between RPI, IBM, and New York State to further nanotechnology innovations. The center's main focus is on reducing the cost associated with the development of nanoscale materials and devices, such as used in the semiconductor industry. The university has also stated the center will also be used for interdisciplinary research in biotechnology, medicine, energy, and other fields.

== Capabilities ==
At the release of the TOP500 supercomputer rankings in June 2010 the CCI was ranked the 80th most powerful supercomputer in the world, with a peak processing power of 91.75 Teraflops or 91.75 trillion floating point operations per second. When finished, all of the systems at the center will have a combined power surpassing 100 teraflops.

=== Hardware ===
The original supercomputer consisted of a series of IBM BlueGene/L systems which contain a total of 32,768 PowerPC 440 700 MHz processors. There is also a heterogeneous array of Power-based Linux machines and AMD Opteron processor-based clusters running on a common file system with the main supercomputer. Together, these systems created over 100 TeraFLOPS of computational power with associated high-speed networking and storage. In April 2013, the CCI Blue Gene/L was decommissioned and powered off.

In August 2012, the CCI installed a 1 rack IBM Blue Gene/Q containing 16,384 A2 cores. The system was expanded to two racks (32,768 cores) in February 2013 placing at #76 on the June 2013 Top500 list. The system was expanded again to a total of 5 racks (81920 cores) by October 2013 when the new name of the system, AMOS, was announced. Capable of performing over 1.1 petaFLOPS, the 5 rack system placed #38 on the next Top500 list in November 2013.

The CCI connects to the Rensselaer Troy campus and the NYSERNet optical research infrastructure, enabling gigabit/second connections to the Internet and Internet2, National LambdaRail (NLR), and most of the research networks in the world through a peering point in Manhattan.
