= Herta Regina Leng =

Austrian-American physicist and educator

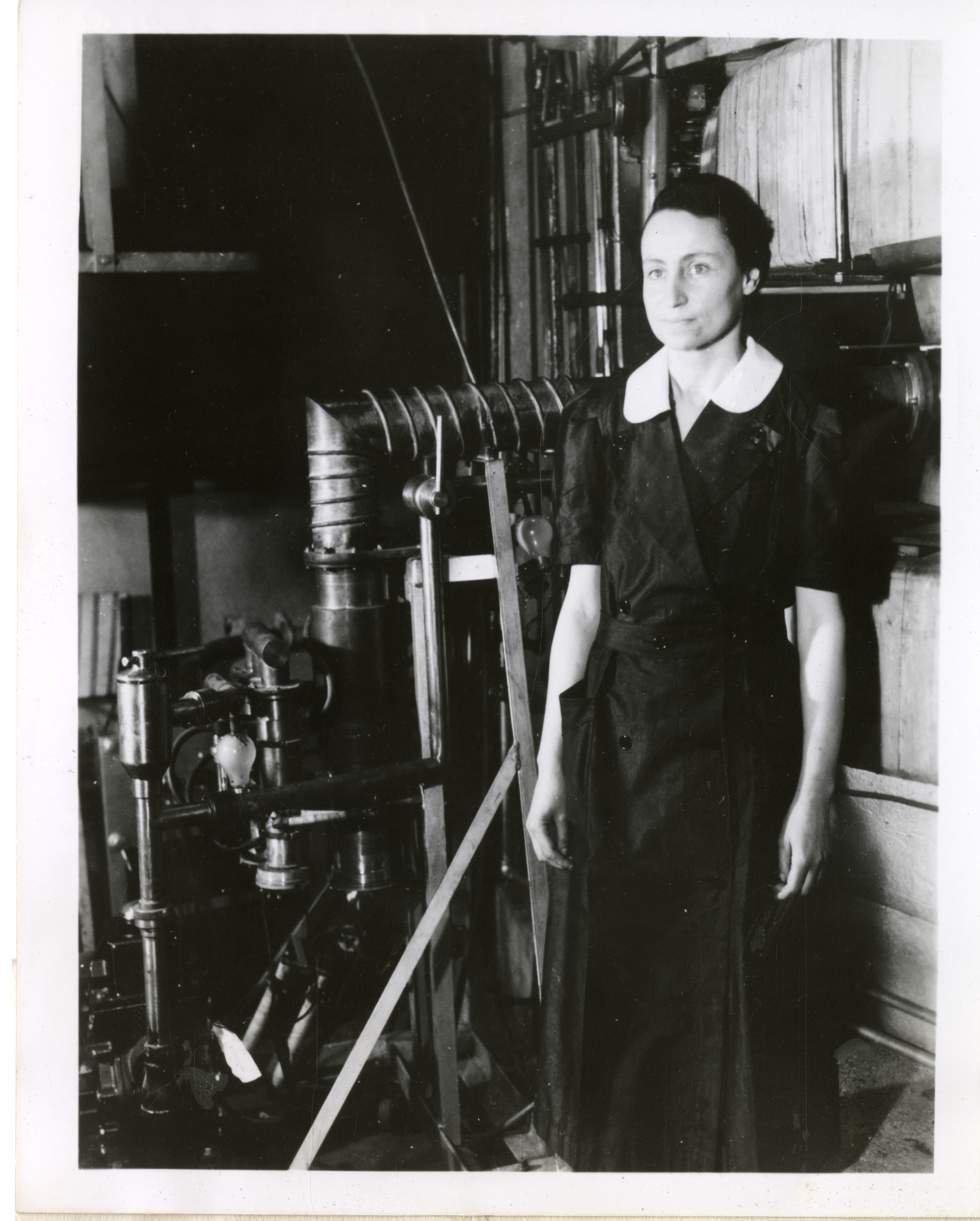
Herta Regina Leng, physicist and educator

Herta Regina Leng (24 February 1903 – 17 July 1997) was an Austrian-American physicist and educator.

Leng was born on 24 February 1903 in Vienna, Austria. She was the daughter of Arthur Leng and Paula Leng, and sister of Leopold Ignaz Leng. Leng fled Austria in 1939 and eventually emigrated to the United States in 1940. She died on 17 July 1997 in Troy, New York.

== Purdue and RPI ==
Dr. Karl Lark-Horovitz, professor of physics at Purdue, had a keen interest in the development of the cyclotron and the application of physical techniques to solve biological problems, and sought to develop methods that utilized radioactive tracers produced from the cyclotron. With the assistance of Leng and Donald Tendam, radioactive tracers were employed following an intense regimen to develop these methods. Key studies concerned sodium and potassium in the human body and their uptake, distribution and excretion; sodium and potassium distribution in human blood cells; and the analysis of enteric coatings for medications. Leng was awarded an American Association of University Women fellowship for work at Purdue. The fellowship permitted her the freedom to pursue the pioneer research on radioactive tracer materials.

In 1943, Leng moved to Troy, NY to accept a faculty appointment in physics at Rensselaer Polytechnic Institute (RPI) and in 1966 was promoted to become RPI's first female full professor.

== Professional associations ==
- Sigma Xi, Rensselaer Polytechnic Institute Chapter

== Awards and honors ==
- Herta Leng Memorial Lecture Series, Rensselaer Polytechnic Institute

Every year, RPI honors Leng with the Herta Leng Memorial Lecture Series.

== Select publications ==
- Adsorptionsversuche an Gläsern and Filtersubstanzen nach der Methode der radioaktiven Indikatoren. (Adsorption experiments on glasses and filter substances according to the method of radioactive indicators.)
- Radioactive indicators, enteric coatings and intestinal absorption.
- A new method of testing enteric coatings.
- On the Existence of Single Magnetic Poles.
- Pioneer woman in nuclear science.
