= George M. Low Center for Industrial Innovation =

Coordinates: 42°43′45″N 73°40′43″W

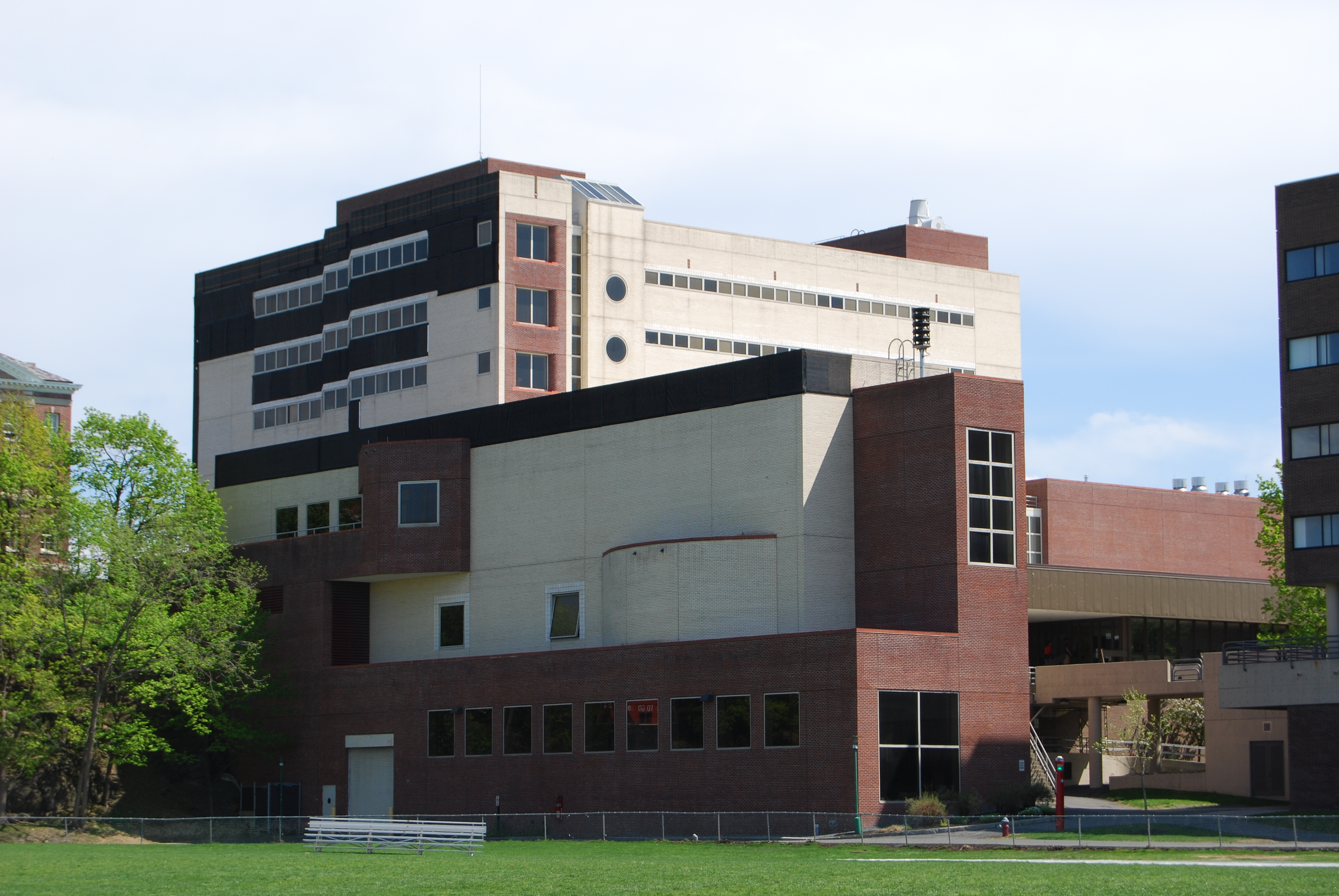
- The George M. Low Center
- Interactive map of the George M. Low Center for Industrial Innovation area
- Alternative names: CII; Low Center
- Etymology: Named for George M. Low

General information
- Construction started: Summer 1984
- Completed: May 14, 1987
- Cost: $60,000,000

Technical details
- Floor count: 9
- Floor area: 200,000 sq ft (19,000 m^{2})
- Lifts/elevators: 4

The George M. Low Center for Industrial Innovation, otherwise known as the Low Center or CII, is an industry-funded research center at Rensselaer Polytechnic Institute in Troy, New York, US.

== History ==
The center is named after George M. Low, who was an administrator at NASA and President of the institute. With the support of Eastman Kodak, IBM, Colt Industries and General Electric, a proposal was made to New York Governor Hugh Carey to jointly sponsor a research and teaching center to promote industrial innovation. In July 1982, the State of New York agreed to use Rensselaer as the site for the new center. Construction began during the summer of 1984, and the center was dedicated on May 14, 1987.

The CII building is notorious for its tall, hollow center stairwells. In 1992 the self-declared Rensselaer Drop Squad spent most of a semester dropping a series of ever more bizarre items down the 7-story stairwell before they were eventually apprehended. The items included typewriters, 150 McDonald's hamburgers, tennis balls and a Christmas tree.

On 29 March 2007, RPI graduate Anson Tripp committed suicide by jumping from the top of one of the stairwells after traveling to RPI from Massachusetts. Because of uncertainties surrounding the death, there was a full evacuation of the building and shutdown of all campus activities after his body was found. In August 2008, metal cables were installed in the center of the two main stairwells to prevent objects from falling, most likely in response to this event.

Starting in early 2008, planning began on an exterior overhaul, replacing the vast network of faulty bricks that encase the building. Black tarp was placed around part of the building to prevent falling bricks from injuring people below. As of February 2011, work on the north wall of the central tower has been completed, with work beginning on the northern annex section of the building.

== Facilities ==
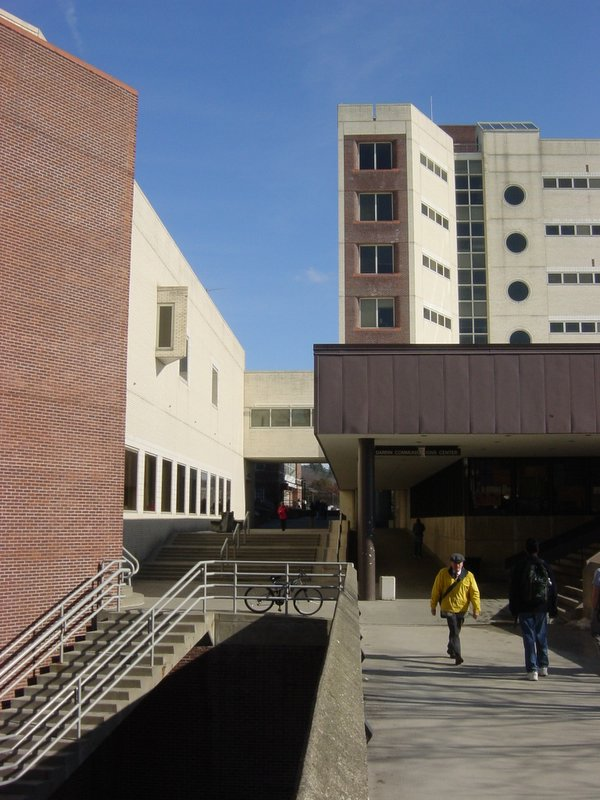
CII and DCC (foreground)

The nine-story, 200,000 sq ft (19,000 m^{2}). building contains an underground high-bay, 10,000-square-foot (930 m^{2}) class 100 clean room, ninety laboratories, ten conference rooms and many offices.

=== Research Centers in the Low Center ===
- Center for Integrated Electronics (CIE)
  - Within the CIE:
  - Center for Advanced Interconnect Systems Technologies (CAIST)
  - Center for Broadband Data Transport Science and Technology
  - Center for Microcontamination Control
  - Center for Power Electronics Systems (CPES)
  - The Focus Center - New York, Rensselaer: Interconnections for Gigascale Integration
- Advanced Power Device Research Laboratory
- Center for Automation Technologies and Systems (CATS)
- New York Center for Astrobiology
- Center for Terahertz Research
- Scientific Computation Research Center
- Future Chips Constellation

=== The George M. Low Gallery ===
Upon his death, the Low family bequeathed all of Low's awards and memorabilia to the institute, where they are housed in the George M. Low Gallery, a museum on the fourth floor, which is a tribute to George Low, NASA, and the engineers of the Apollo program. It is designed to appear like outer space; darkness contrasts with the lit exhibits, and pictures of astronauts and space are backlit from the outside.

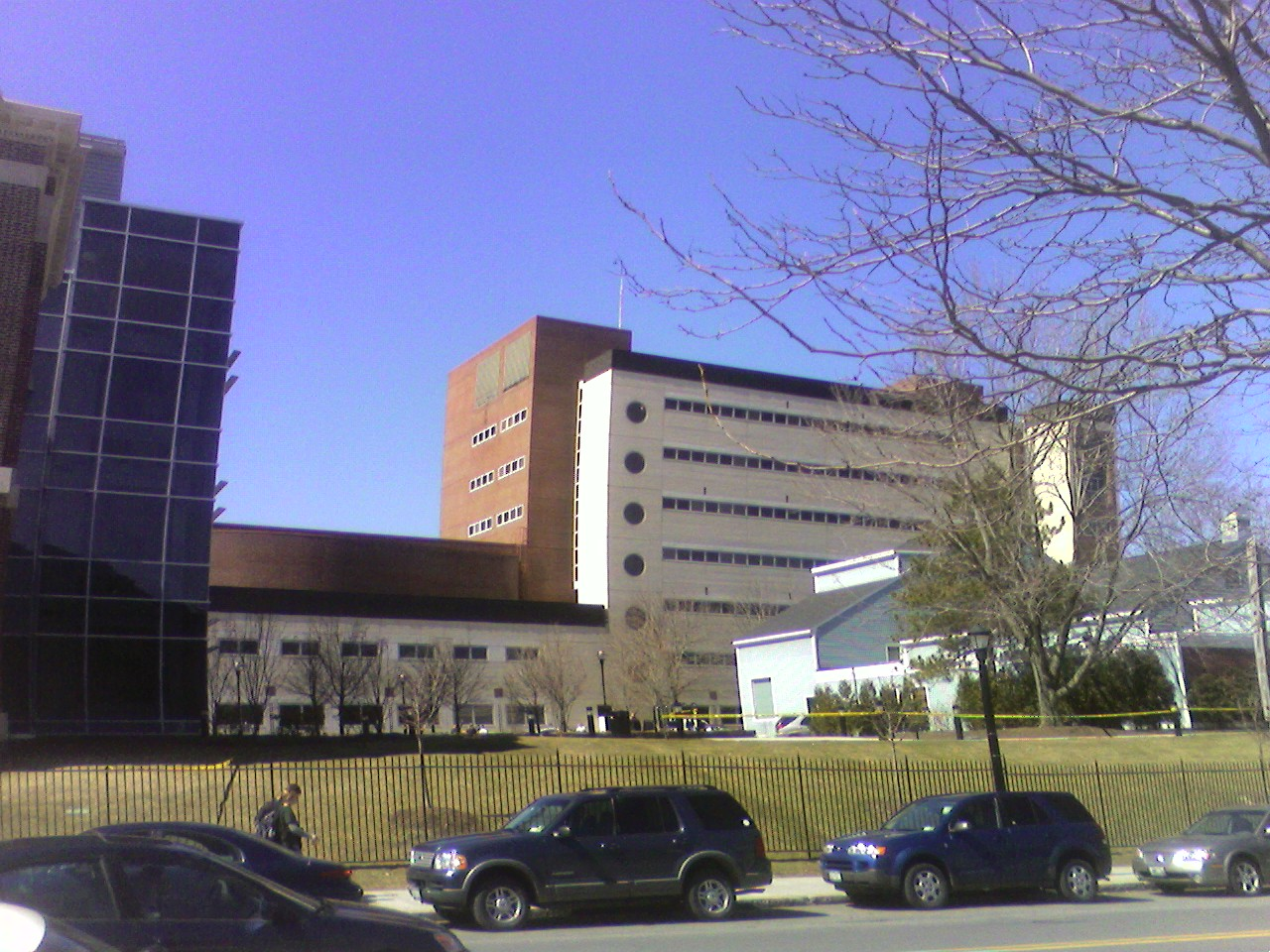
East side of the Low Center

From the top floor, looking southwest

== External links and references ==
- RPI Research Centers
- Article about the formation of the Low Center
