= Garnet Baltimore =

American architect

Garnet Douglass Baltimore
- Born: 15 April 1859; Troy, New York
- Died: 12 June 1946; Troy, New York
- Resting place: Oakwood Cemetery
- Education: Rensselaer Polytechnic Institute
- Occupation: Civil Engineer
- Spouse: Mary Lane

Garnet Douglass Baltimore (April 15, 1859 – June 12, 1946) was the first African-American engineer and graduate of Rensselaer Polytechnic Institute in Troy, New York, Class of 1881.

He was named for two prominent abolitionists, Henry Highland Garnet and Frederick Douglass. Baltimore's father, Peter, was a pupil of Garnet and associated with Douglass.

He was known for his architectural, engineering, and landscaping work, including Prospect Park in Troy, and Forest Park Cemetery in Brunswick, New York. During his work on the extension of a lock on the Oswego Canal, Baltimore developed a system to test cement that was adopted as standard by New York State.

== Early life ==
Garnet Baltimore was born in Troy, New York on April 15, 1859. His parents were Peter F. Baltimore and Caroline Newcomb Baltimore. Peter owned a well-known barbershop in Troy known as the Veranda. Peter and his brother William were active in the Underground Railroad and were prominent figures in the escape of Charles Nalle during his attempted arrest in 1860. Baltimore's grandfather was Samuel Baltimore, a slave who fought in the Revolutionary War.

Baltimore was born in Troy, New York and lived at 162 Eighth Street his entire life. The Great Fire on May 10, 1862, destroyed his home. In an article featured in The Times Record of Troy, New York celebrating his 84th Birthday, Baltimore recalled taking refuge in the Holy Cross Episcopal Church on 8th Street with his family and other neighborhood children during the fire. Baltimore attended the Troy Academy, where he and his brother were the first two African American students admitted, and graduated in 1877. He was a graduate of Rensselaer Polytechnic Institute in 1881 with a degree in Civil Engineering.

== Career as a civil engineer ==
Garnet Baltimore was a lifelong resident of Troy, New York, and was employed throughout the Capital Region. After graduating from RPI, Baltimore worked on the Albany and Greenbush Bridge and was an assistant engineer for other projects, including the Sandy Hill Railroad and the Albany, Granville, and Rutland Railroad. At his new job, Baltimore was tasked with several assignments including: the Sandy Hill, Granville & Rutland, and Greenwich & Johnsonville railroads. Baltimore would remain in this position for the next eight years.

In 1884, Baltimore was tasked with supervising the extension of the Oswego Canal lock which was known back then as the “mud lock.” During this project, there was a very interesting situation in which the engineers had to deal with the issue of constructing with quicksand as a major obstacle. Baltimore devised a method of creating cement to overcome this challenge, and it became the new standard for New York state when making cement. In 1891, Baltimore returned to Troy and was hired as assistant engineer for the city’s Public Improvement Commission. This would eventually be followed up with a promotion three years later when he became assistant city engineer.

=== Work on waterways ===
Baltimore was well known for his work on waterways. He was involved in many Hudson River improvements and Troy waterworks. While employed by the New York State Department of Public Works, he worked on the Shinnecock and Peconic Canal. During his work on the Oswego Canal, he developed a comparative test of cement using quartz and sands. Baltimore was also a landscape engineer for many cemeteries in the Capital Region including the Oakwood Cemetery and Forest Park Cemetery in Troy, New York, and several other cemeteries in Hoosick Falls, Glens Falls, and Amsterdam, New York.

=== Work as a landscape engineer ===
In 1903, Baltimore was appointed a position to be a landscape engineer for the public park systems that would earn him a salary of $2,000 a year. Then in 1906, Baltimore was promoted to the position of engineer for Troy’s Department of Parks. During this time, Baltimore was tasked with drawing up the plans for a park on what was known back then as “Warren Hill.” Today, the park is known to the locals as Prospect Park which is located in downtown Troy, NY and is a popular site for the locals and students alike. The creation of Prospect Park became well-known and Baltimore used this same model for his other famous projects including: Central Park in New York City and Prospect Park in Brooklyn.

Baltimore dedicated much of his work to the beautification and development of Troy, New York. His most well-regarded accomplishment in Troy was his work designing Prospect Park. The 80-acre park is still in use by Troy residents today. Unfortunately, much of the original work Baltimore designed no longer exists due to poor management. In 1943, Baltimore published an opinion piece in The Times Record of Troy, New York. Baltimore describes his frustration with the mismanagement of the park. He states, “Is the civic pride of Trojans so deadened that no murmur of regret is heart at this willful neglect?” By the 1940s, several of the original features had already been lost, including the Warren Mansion, Band Stand, and Bascom fountain. The Friends of Prospect Park formed in 1998 and has attempted to increase popularity and restore its beauty lost over years of neglect. Baltimore also created the Report of the Municipal Improvements Commission, where he reported: “the primary object of the park is a place where natural beauty can be enjoyed free from the turmoil of the city.” He also noted: “It is the calling and duty of the landscape engineer to devise ways of arranging land and its accompanying landscape so that whatever the particular purpose in view may be, the result shall be as thoroughly beautiful as possible.”

"In his later years he made surveys and maps for attorneys of scenes of accidents and crimes, and testified in court about those measurements. The Times Record hailed Baltimore as 'probably the greatest surveyor of the city’s history.'”

== Personal life ==
Baltimore was married to Mary Lane and had no children.

== Death and legacy ==
Garnet Baltimore died at the age of 87 on June 12, 1946, in Troy, New York. At the time, he was the oldest living graduate of RPI. Baltimore was inducted as a life-member of the Rensselaer Society of Engineers in 1946. He was active in the Rensselaer Alumni Association and the 50 Year Club.

Beginning in 1991, RPI established the Garnet D. Baltimore Lecture Series in his honor. In February 2005, former Troy mayor Harry Tutunjian ceremonially renamed the section of Eighth Street between Hoosick Street and Congress Street as Garnet Douglass Baltimore Street. RPI has also established the Garnet D. Baltimore Endowed Scholarship in Baltimore's honor to address the need for scholarships for students from underrepresented groups. In August 2019, former Troy mayor Patrick Madden unveiled a new trail marker to dedicate a recently restored walking trail located in the southwest corner of Troy’s historic Prospect Park as the Garnet Douglass Baltimore Trail.
