= Theodore Judah =

American engineer and businessman (1826–1863)

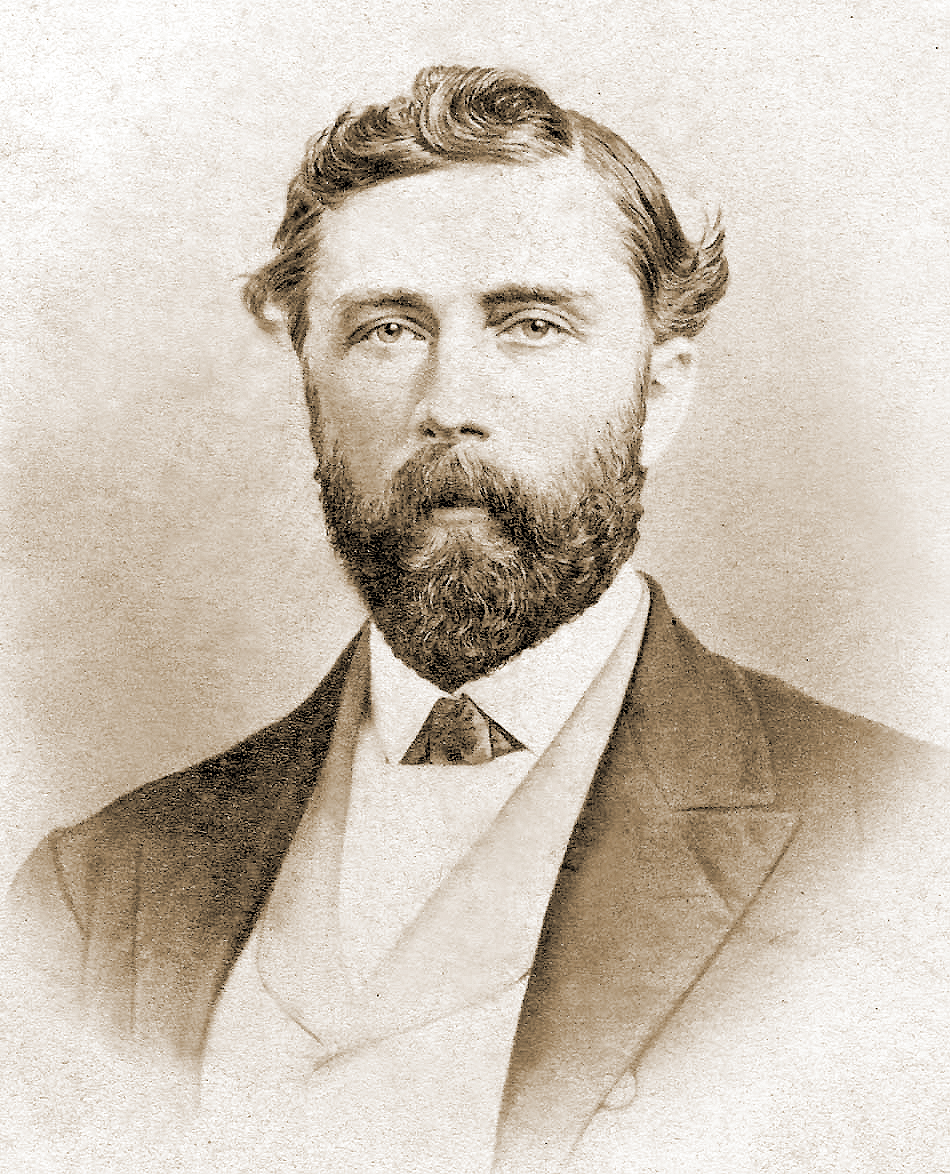
- Portrait of Judah, c. 1862
- Born: Theodore Dehone Judah; March 4, 1826; Bridgeport, Connecticut, U.S.
- Died: November 2, 1863 (aged 37); New York City, U.S.
- Education: Rensselaer Institute in 1837
- Occupation: Civil engineer
- Employer: Central Pacific Railroad
- Known for: railroad pioneer
- Title: Chief Engineer, CPRR
- Spouse: Anna Pierce (m. 1849)

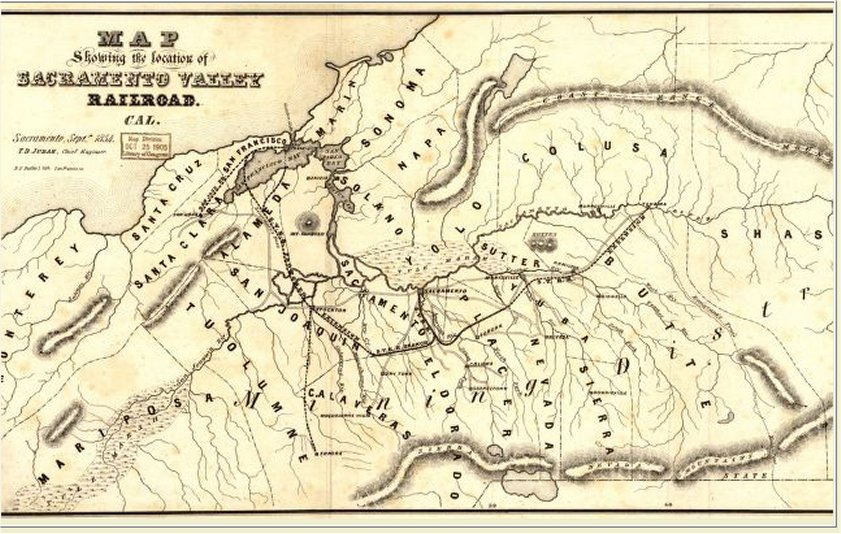
Sketch of the Sacramento Valley RR as provided by its engineer, Theodore Judah.

Theodore Dehone Judah (March 4, 1826 – November 2, 1863) was an American civil engineer who was a central figure in the original promotion, establishment, and design of the first transcontinental railroad. He found investors for what became the Central Pacific Railroad (CPRR). As chief engineer, he performed much of the route survey work to determine the best alignment for the railroad over the Sierra Nevada, which was completed six years after his death.

== Early life and education ==
Theodore Judah was born in 1826 (perhaps 1825) in Bridgeport, Connecticut, the son of Mary (Reece) and Henry Raymond Judah, an Episcopal clergyman. After his family moved to Troy, New York, Judah attended the Rensselaer Polytechnic Institute, then called the Rensselaer Institute in 1837 for a term and developed at a young age a passion for engineering and railroads.

At age 23, Judah married Anna Pierce on May 10, 1849. Theirs was the first wedding in the then-new St James Episcopal Church of Greenfield, Massachusetts.

== Career ==
After studying briefly at Rensselaer, Judah went to work on a number of railroads in the Northeast, including engineering for the Lewiston Railroad down the Niagara Gorge. He was elected member of the American Society of Civil Engineers in May 1853; at that time there were fewer than 800 civil engineers in the United States. Judah was hired in 1854 at age 28, by Colonel Charles Lincoln Wilson, as the Chief Engineer for the Sacramento Valley Railroad in California. He and his wife Anna sailed to Nicaragua, crossed over to the Pacific, and caught a steamer to San Francisco. Under his charge, Sacramento Valley became in February 1856 the first common carrier railroad built west of the Mississippi River. Later, he was chief engineer of the California Central Railroad, incorporated 1857, and the San Francisco and Sacramento Railroad organized in 1856.

=== Pacific railroad surveys ===
In January 1857 in Washington, D.C., Judah published "A practical plan for building The Pacific Railroad", in which he outlined the general plan and argued for the need to do a detailed survey of a specific selected route for the railroad, not a general reconnaissance of several possible routes that had been done earlier.

Nominated in the 1859 California Pacific Railroad Convention in San Francisco, Judah was sent to Washington, D.C., to lobby in general for the Pacific Railroad. Congress was distracted by the trouble of pre-Civil War America and showed little interest. He returned noting that he had to find a specific practical route and some private financial backing to do a detailed engineering survey.

In the fall of 1860, Charles Marsh, surveyor, civil engineer and water company owner, met with Judah, who had recently built the Sacramento Valley Railroad from Sacramento to Folsom, California. Marsh, who had already surveyed a potential railroad route between Sacramento and Nevada City, California, a decade earlier, went with Judah into the Sierra Nevada Mountains. There they examined the Henness Pass Turnpike Company’s route (Marsh was a founding director of that company). They measured elevations and distances, and discussed the possibility of a transcontinental railroad. Both came back from this trip convinced that it could be done.

In November 1860, Judah published "Central Pacific Railroad to California", in which he declared "the discovery of a practicable route from the city of Sacramento upon the divide between Bear River and the North Fork of the American, via Illinoistown (near Colfax), Dutch Flat, and Summit Valley (Donner Pass) to the Truckee River". He advocated the chosen Dutch Flat-Donner Pass route as the most practical one with maximum grades of one hundred feet per mile and 150 miles shorter than the route recommended in the government's reports. Much of the Sierra Nevada where the practical routes were located was double-ridged, meaning two summits separated by a valley, Donner Pass was not and thus was more suitable for a railroad. From Dutch Flat, the Pacific road would climb steadily up the ridge between the North Fork American and Bear Rivers to the Pass before winding down steadily following the Truckee River out of the mountains into the Great Basin of Nevada. In December 1860 or early January 1861, Marsh met with Theodore Judah and Dr. Daniel Strong in Strong’s drug store in Dutch Flat, California, to discuss the project, which they called the Central Pacific Railroad of California.

Judah's youthful interest in the general subject of a Pacific Railroad developed during this period into almost an obsession, his wife observing that...

Everything he did from the time he went to California to the day of his death was for the great continental Pacific railway. Time, money, brains, strength, body, and soul were absorbed. It was the burden of his thought day and night, largely of his conversation, till it used to be said 'Judah's Pacific Railroad crazy,' and I would say, 'Theodore, those people don't care,' or 'you give your thunder away.' He'd laugh and say, 'But we must keep the ball rolling.' Wheat, A Sketch of the Life of Theodore D. Judah (1925)

=== Central Pacific Railroad (CPRR) ===
Failing to raise funds for the Central Pacific project in San Francisco, Judah succeeded in signing up five Sacramento merchants, : James Bailey, Leland Stanford, Collis P. Huntington, Mark Hopkins, and Charles Crocker. On June 28, 1861, the Central Pacific Rail Way of California (CPRR) was incorporated with Judah as the chief engineer. At this point in time, Judah had the CPRR backing to survey the route over the Sierra Nevada along which the railroad was to be built during the 1860s, as well as barometric reconnaissance of two other routes, which turned out to be inferior. In a report dated October 1, 1861, Judah discussed the results of the survey, the merits of the chosen Dutch Flat-Donner Pass route, and the estimated costs from Sacramento to points as far as Salt Lake City. On October 9, 1861, the CPRR directors authorized Judah to go back to Washington, D.C., this time as the agent of CPRR, to procure "appropriations of land and U.S. Bonds from the Government to aid in the construction of this road". The next day, Judah published a strip map (a.k.a. the Theodore Judah map), 30 inches tall by 66 feet long, of the proposed alignment of the Central Pacific Railroad. On October 11, 1861, Judah boarded a steamer in San Francisco headed for Panama.

At Washington, D.C., Judah began an active campaign for a Pacific Railroad bill. He was made the clerk of the House subcommittee on the bill and also obtained an appointment as secretary of the Senate subcommittee. On July 1, 1862, President Lincoln signed the Pacific Railroad Act into law, which authorized the issuance of land grants and U.S. bonds to CPRR and the newly chartered Union Pacific Railroad for the construction of a transcontinental railroad. Judah then went to New York to order supplies and sailed back to California on July 21, 1862, having accomplished his mission in less than a year.

== Death ==
Judah died of yellow fever on November 2, 1863. He contracted the disease in Panama on a voyage with his wife to New York City, apparently becoming infected during their land passage across the Isthmus of Panama. He was traveling to New York to seek alternative financing to buy out the major investors. Anna took his body back to Greenfield, Massachusetts, where he was buried in the Pierce family plot in the Federal Street Cemetery. He died before his dream of a transcontinental railroad could be completed.

== Legacy ==
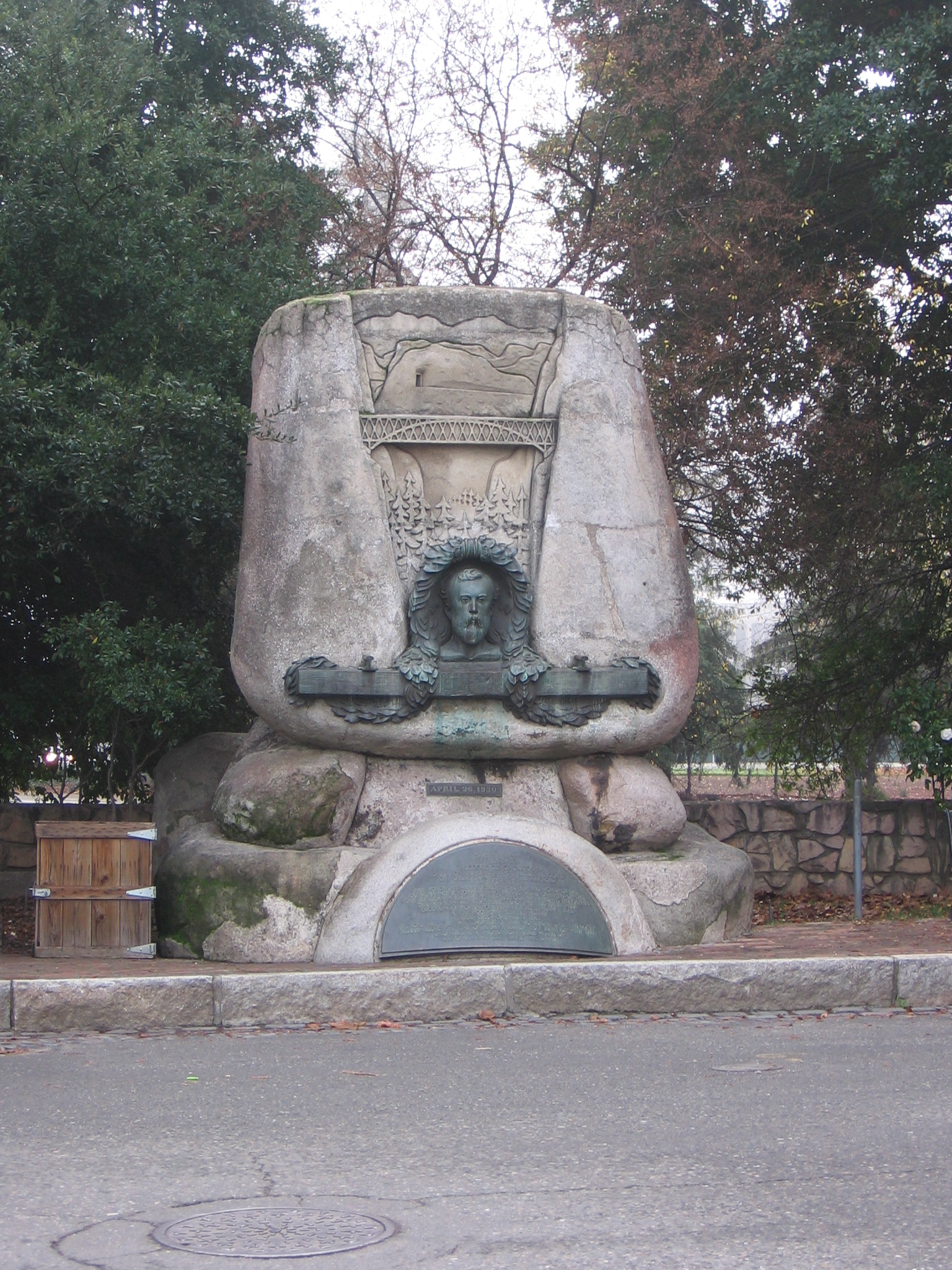
Theodore Judah monument (1930), northeast corner of 2nd and L Street in Old Sacramento, CA

Within days of Judah's death, the CPRR's first locomotive, Gov. Stanford, made a trial run over the new railroad's first 500 feet of track in Sacramento, California.

- The CPRR named one of its steam locomotives (CP No. 4) after him. Judah crossed paths with the 19-ton locomotive bearing his name while on his way to New York.
- Mount Judah, an 8,243-foot peak in Placer County, California, located adjacent to Donner Peak and Mount Lincoln in the Sierra Nevada Tahoe National Forest, was formally named for Judah on October 18, 1940, by the U.S. Board on Geographic Names. Running through the mountain about 1,000 below the summit is the 10,322-foot long single track UPRR Sierra Grade Tunnel No. 41 (aka "The Big Hole") which was opened in 1925 and carries both UPRR freight and Amtrak passenger trains in both directions over Donner Summit between Soda Springs and Eder. This route bypasses the original, now abandoned 1868 CPRR "Summit Tunnel" (No. 6) surveyed by Judah which is located a mile to the north and had remained in service until 1993.
- Judah Street in San Francisco and its N-Judah Muni streetcar line are named after him.
- Memorial plaques dedicated to him have been erected in Folsom and Sacramento, California
- Elementary schools in Sacramento and Folsom are named after Judah.

=== Honors ===
"In purely engineering retrospect, Judah’s achievements would seem nothing short of providential, especially in comparison to modern route surveying efforts. With a minimal survey crew utilizing crude instruments and only draft animals for transportation, Judah was able to lay out a remarkably accurate alignment across the most difficult natural obstacles undertaken up until that time (1861)." J. David Rogers and Charles R. Spinks, ASCE Golden Spike 150th Anniversary History Symposium, Sacramento, CA, May 6, 2019

== See also ==
- California and the railroads
- N Judah
