= Frear Park =

Park in Troy, New York, United States

- Location within New York
- Type: Urban park
- Location: Troy, New York, United States
- Coordinates: 42°45′N 73°40′W
- Area: 247 acres (1.00 km^{2})
- Created: May 12, 1917
- Operator: Frear Park Conservancy
- Open: All Year (except holidays)

Frear Park is an urban park in the city of Troy, New York. It was initially opened in 1917, on land donated by the Frear Family, later expanding to its current size of 247 acres (100 ha). The park contains nature trails, as well as tennis courts, a golf course, and an ice rink.

== History ==
The original donators of the park, the Frear Family, initially lived in France where their name was 'Frere'. When they moved to England to escape turmoil in France due to World War I, the family name was changed to 'Frear'. The park's fountain was created in 1924, and the maintenance facility the year after. The golf course, initially a 9-hole course, was finished in Spring 1931, with the expansion to a full 18 holes coming in 1964. A $1.2 million irrigation system was later added in 2014. Over 46,000 rounds of golf are played at the course each year. The on-site Irish pub / restaurant was established in 1935, and the ice rink in 1980. In the early 1890s, the city of Troy decided that it wanted to build a public parkland. A parks commission was initiated to identify potential areas to build a public park. New York State approved the city’s plan to build the park in 1892. The project started to pick up in 1917 when a man decided to donate land to the park. The donor was William H. Frear, the grandson of Joseph Frear, who brought the Frears to the United States. William Frear donated 22 acres of land to Frear Park in June 1917. When the Frears donated the land, they had four requirements. The first was to have the park be public property, the second was to have Frear Avenue be named what it is, the third was to allow the Frears to build the gate that serves as the entrance to the park, and the fourth was that the fountain be preserved. The park's fountain was finished in 1924, and the maintenance facility the year after. The Frear family had donated 22 acres back in 1917, but they were not done giving to the city of Troy. In 1922, Jennie Vanderhayden, a member of the Frear family, donated 20 more acres. This brought the total land area to 190 acres, about 60 acres shy of the 247 acres that it boasts today. Along with the additional land came the construction of the Arcadia building, which is now used in Frear Park as a maintenance building. The building was described at the time of the opening as “a beautiful structure made from brick and the dance hall will accommodate 300 dancers. At each end is a stone fireplace. There is a bubbling drinking fountain for the people to use. The floor is highly polished.” Now, the park is mainly used for recreation, golf, and its ice rink.

Course record. (61) Ray Henry.

== Attractions ==
The park features a 6,903-yard, 18-hole golf course with a par of 71 strokes. The course was rated as best golf course in the Upper Valley by Hudson Valley Magazine in 2003. The Rensselaer County Men's Golf Tournament and Mayor's Cup are held at the course annually. The park also includes an ice rink that houses both public skating as well as adult and youth ice hockey programs through the Troy Albany Youth Hockey Association. Also located in the park are tennis courts, softball fields, picnic areas, a playground, a pagoda, and two lakes (Wright and Bradley).

== See also ==
- Prospect Park
