= Prospect Park (Troy, New York) =

Public park in Troy, New York

Coordinates: 42.72449°N 73.684165°W

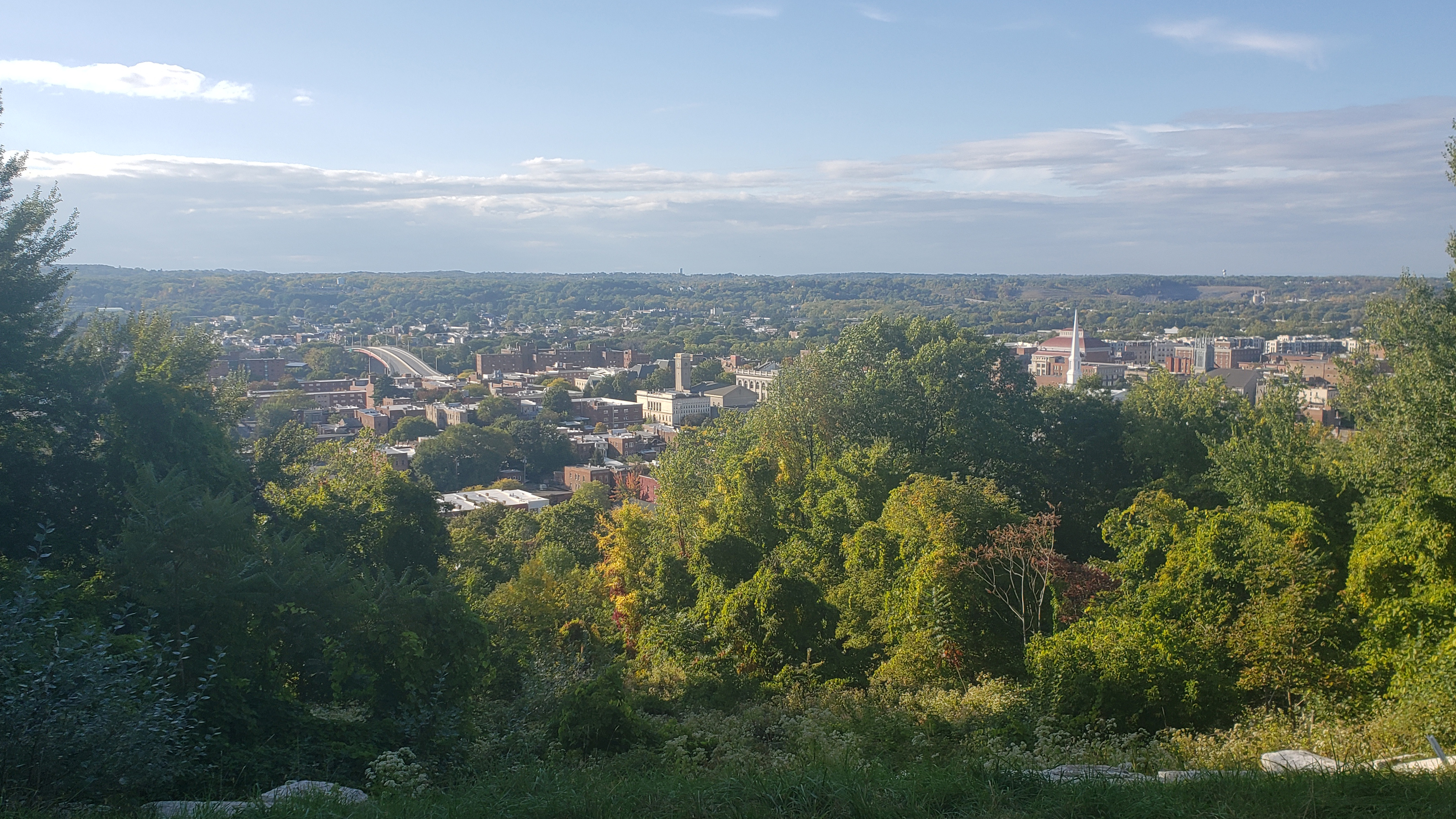
View of Downtown Troy from the park in 2020

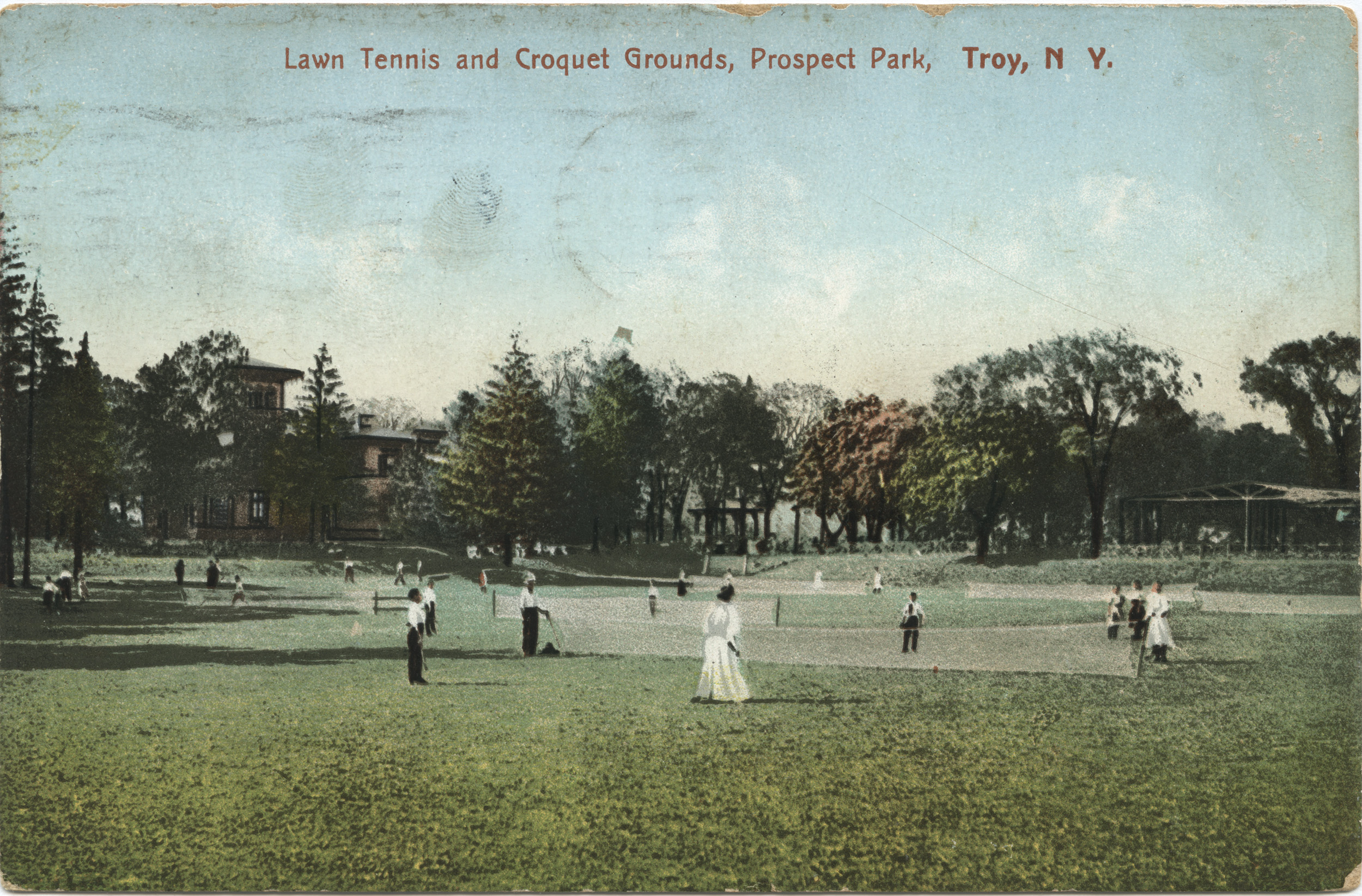
Lawn Tennis and Croquet Grounds, Prospect Park in 1912

Prospect Park is an 80-acre (32 ha) city park in Troy, New York, named after Prospect Park in Brooklyn, New York. The park is situated between Congress and Hill Street on top of Mount Ida. Prospect Park was originally designed in 1903 by local landscape engineer Garnet Douglass Baltimore, the first African-American graduate of Rensselaer Polytechnic Institute (RPI). He had also designed the 200-acre Forest Park Cemetery on Pinewood Avenue in Brunswick in 1897, which is now neglected and far from its picturesque days. The park started to fall into disrepair in the 1950s, and relatively little of Baltimore's work is still evident in the park today.

The park today includes the following recreational areas: 14 tennis courts, four handball courts, two basketball courts, playground, picnic areas, soccer field, comfort station, spray pool, nature trail, a roadway which surrounds the park with eight parking areas, and finally Uncle Sam memorial pavilion which overlooks the city of Troy below.

The Uncle Sam Memorial commemorates Samuel Wilson, who owned this land. It was an open gazebo overlooking the city and the Hudson River. Inside the gazebo were panels with patriotic words inscribed ~ Honesty, Justice, Republic, Independence, Freedom, and Faith. There are three empty places where panels had been. They either fell down or were stolen. It’s likely that Honor was one of them and maybe Patriotism and Loyalty was the other two.

== History ==
Troy's Mount Ida is 285 feet above sea level with visibility up to 20 miles. The land for the park was originally under private ownership. The site, known originally as Warren Hill, was an estate owned by the heirs of the Warren family. The Warren family was a wealthy family known locally for financing the Church of the Holy Cross and the Warren Free Institute. The city of Troy purchased the Warren Hill site for $110,000 in March 1901 and established it as Warren Park. However, the local press and the Troy Common Council liked the name of Prospect Park, in inspiration of the Prospect Park in Brooklyn, New York.

Over the next few years, Garnet Baltimore implemented his designs, adding winding roads and four entrances to the park, fences, a man-made lake, a band shell, observation tower, tennis courts, and playgrounds. There were two mansions on the park dating back when the site was privately owned, called the Warren Mansion and the Vail House. The Warren Mansion was turned into a museum for military relics, and the Vail House turned into a refreshment stand called the “Casino”. In 1926, an above ground swimming pool designed by Wesley Bintz was added to the park. Today the pool is one of the few remaining “Bintz” swimming pools still standing.

Prospect Park remained a popular and well utilized park until the 1950s. In the 1950s Troy was facing the effects of population and employment decline from suburbanization and deindustrialization. In 1933, the Warren mansion was demolished under the Civil Works Administration. In 1943, the Casino was destroyed by fire. In 1994 the Bintz pool was closed due to needing costly repairs.

There are a multitude of rare species of trees to be seen throughout the park, including Catalpa, European beech, Hawthorn, and Magnolias, adding to the overwhelming beauty of the 20 - mile radius view seen from the top of the park. The city of Troy originally planned for the park to be like that of the park in Brooklyn sharing its namesake, to bring a bit of city life from downstate to Troy. Newspapers wrote of the park, “Prospect Park is admirable alliterative and beautifully Brooklynish”, with Brooklyn even admiring and giving support to the park. Because of the great success from the press, the park was opened before fully completed, and then hired Baltimore to complete the project, seeing that he was the best man available for the job as a local graduate of Rensselaer and a Troy native.

In 1998, Friends of Prospect Park was organized by a group of Troy citizens to maintain and promote the public park. It is a nonprofit group responsible for improvements to the children's playground, the sign welcoming patrons as they enter the park, renovations of bathrooms and comfort stations housed beneath the swimming pool, yearly bulb plantings, and many more. However, since then, Prospect Park has lost its popularity among the Troy community and has begun to deteriorate over the years. Today, the group organizes various environmental efforts to do park clean ups and clean ups of surrounding trails to revitalize the park to serve the purpose it was made for in the early 1900s when established. Working alongside the Troy Rehabilitation and Improvement Program, community outreach programs such as the Troy Hidden Garden Tour to bring low - and moderate – income families in Troy to community – building and promoting these communities to home ownership.
