= Winslow Chemical Laboratory =

- U.S. National Register of Historic Places
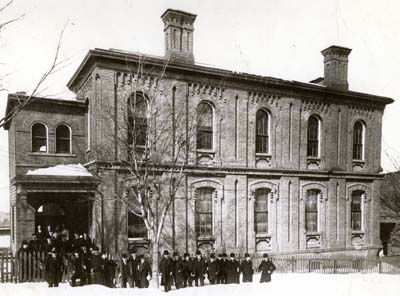
- Winslow Chemical Laboratory in 1866

- Location within New York Location within the United States
- Location: 105 Eighth Street, Troy, New York, USA
- Coordinates: 42°43′51″N 73°41′3″W
- Area: less than one acre
- Built: 1866
- Architectural style: Romanesque
- NRHP reference No.: 94001284
- Added to NRHP: November 4, 1994

The Winslow Chemical Laboratory, known colloquially as the Winslow Building, is a building on the Rensselaer Polytechnic Institute campus in Troy, New York, United States, which finished construction in 1866. It is named in honor of the 5th President of RPI, John F. Winslow, who donated half of the construction cost. The building is brick with stone trimmings and was originally constructed with butternut, chestnut and black walnut. The whole building was fitted for complete courses in general and analytical chemistry. The design and construction was overseen by Professor Henry B. Nason, head of the department of chemistry at the Institute. The lower story contained a metallurgical laboratory and second story contained a chemical laboratory, store rooms and work rooms. The laboratory could accommodate about 40 students. The third story contained a lecture room, a private study, the library and a recitation room. The library of chemical books was established by a donation of several sets of journals and a gift of three hundred dollars from John F. Winslow.

The laboratory was damaged by a fire in the upper story in 1884 and was rebuilt and enlarged in 1885. The building was again damaged by fire in 1904. It was used as a laboratory until 1907 and then converted into a shop. The building, falling into disrepair, was boarded up in the early 1970s and targeted for demolition. It was added to the National Register of Historic Places on November 4, 1990. As an effort to save the building, it was agreed with the city of Troy that the building would be leased to house a new children's science museum called the Junior Museum. The Junior Museum refurbished the Winslow building and opened its doors in 2000 and remained there until 2004 before moving out. RPI repossessed the building soon after for use as office space. Currently the Winslow Building is home to many research groups affiliated to Cognitive Science and Computer science departments of Rensselaer, namely, the Rensselaer AI and Reasoning Laboratory, the Social and Behavioral Research Laboratory, the Tetherless World Constellation (since 2007), etc.

== Gallery ==
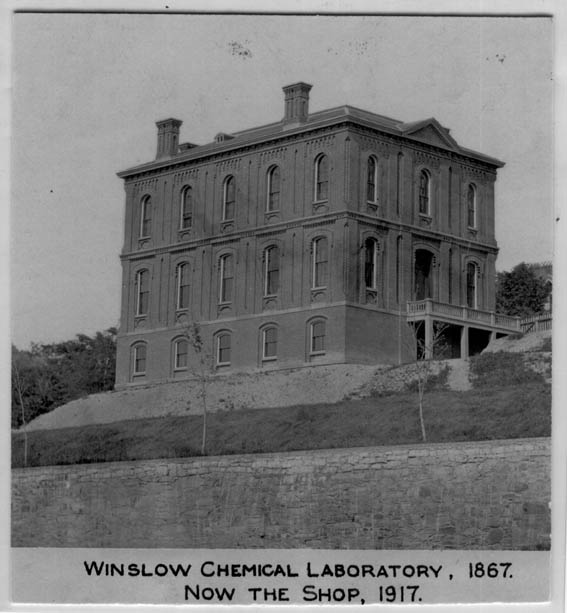
The laboratory circa 1917

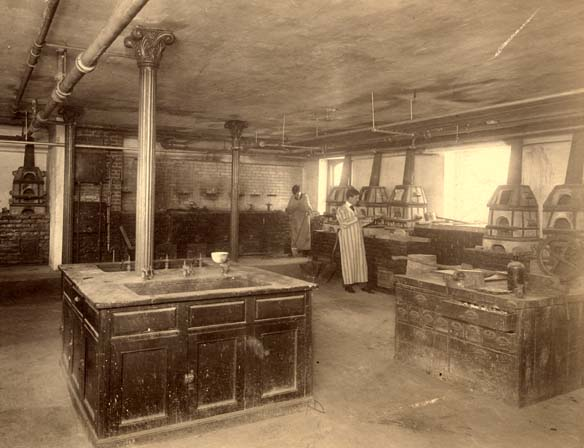
The interior of the lab

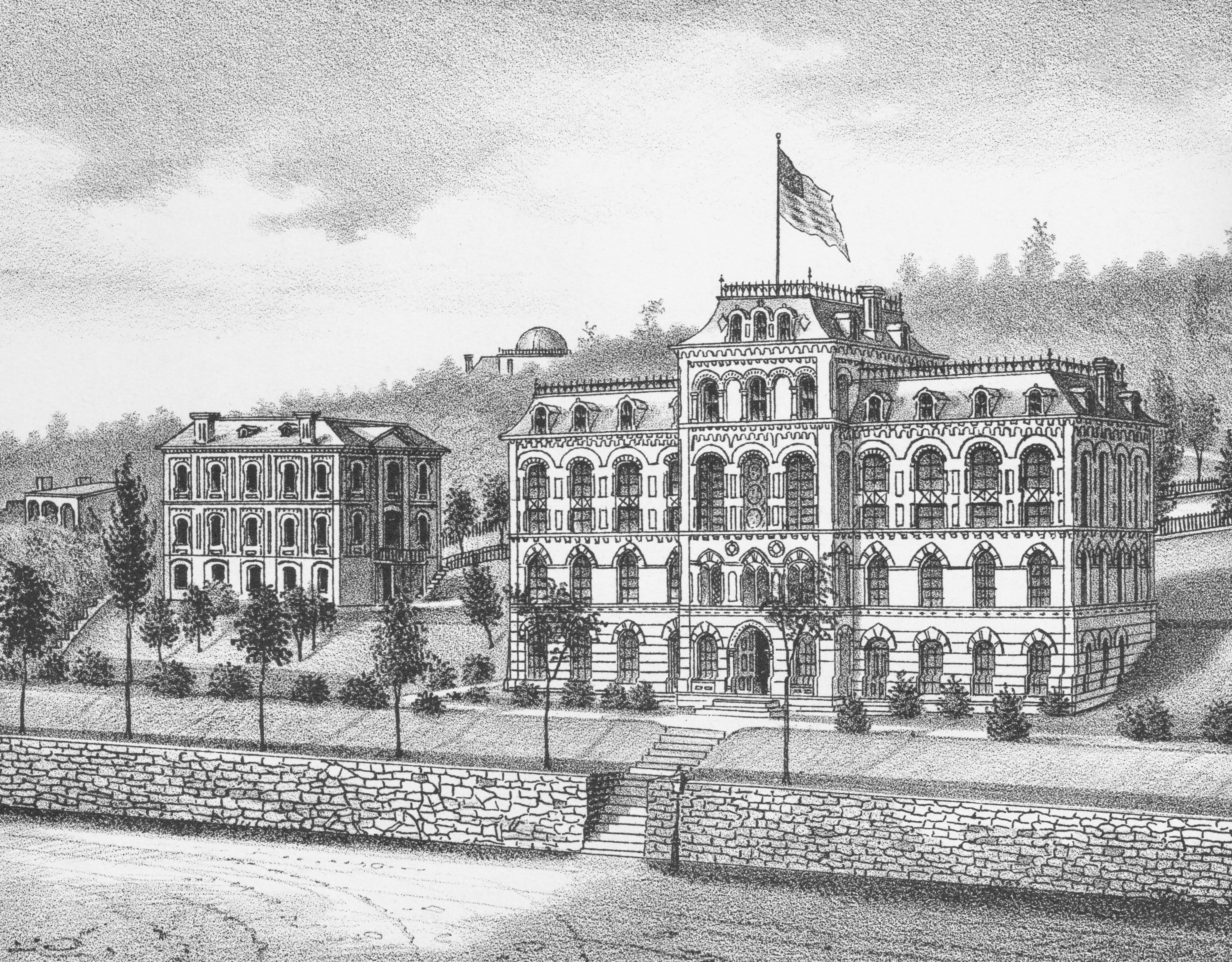
An engraving of the lab on the left next to the Main Building circa 1879

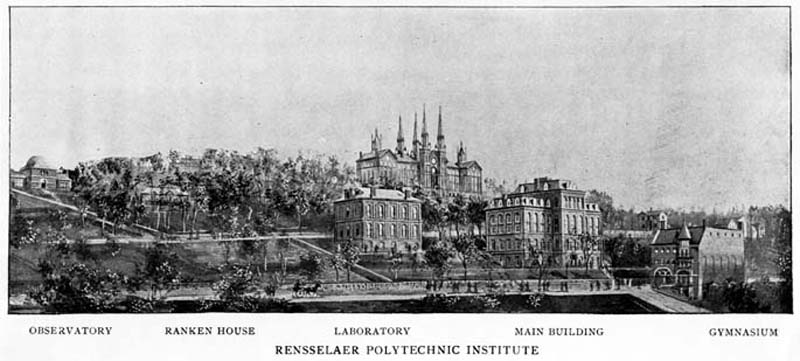
The lab among other RPI buildings circa 1896

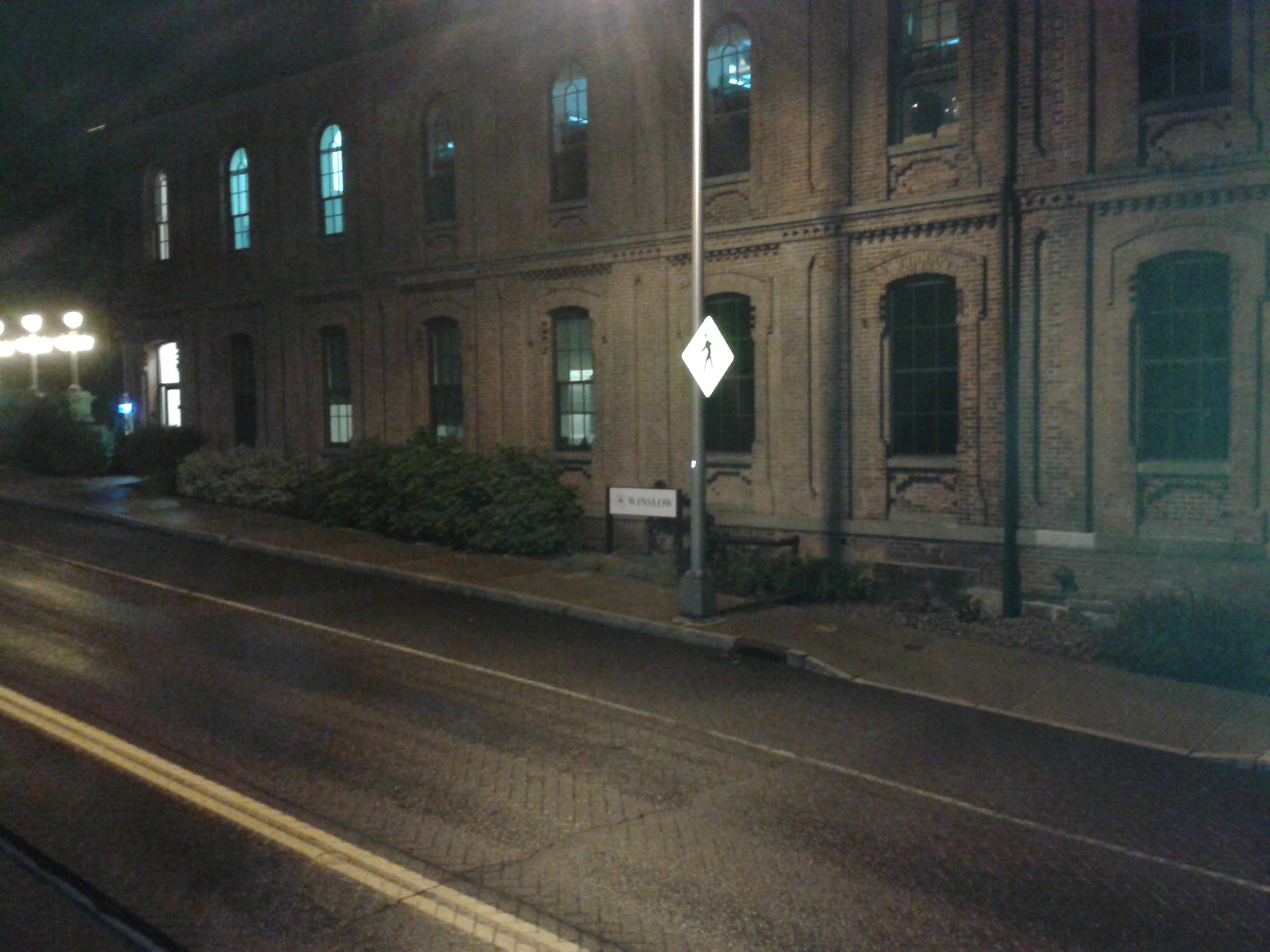
The front of the lab at night circa 2013
