= Orange Ferriss =

American politician

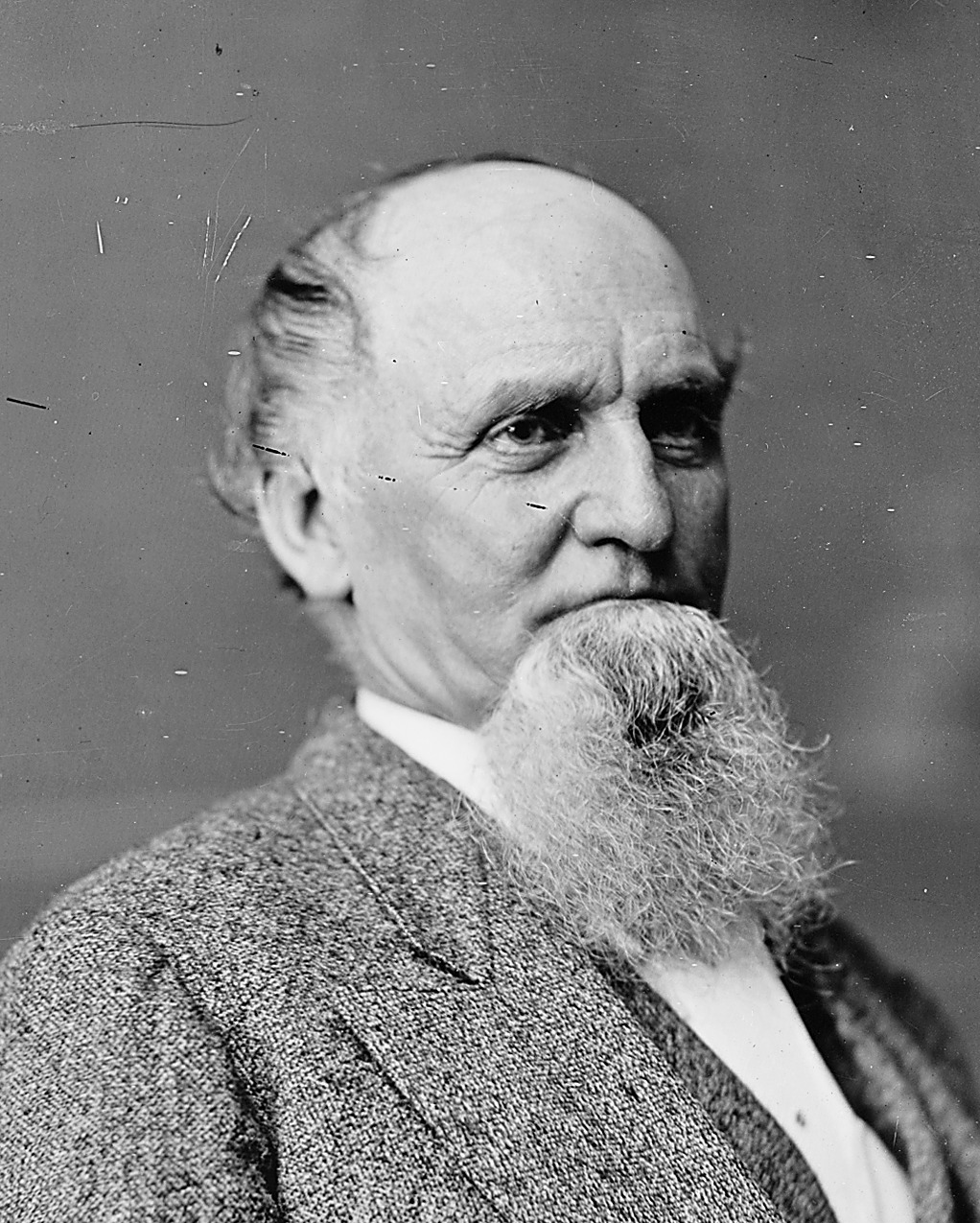
- Born: November 26, 1814; Glens Falls, New York
- Died: April 11, 1894 (aged 79); Glens Falls, New York
- Known for: Service in the U.S. House of Representatives
- Office: Member of the U.S. House of Representatives
- Political party: Republican

Orange Ferriss (November 26, 1814 – April 11, 1894) was a U.S. representative from New York.

Born at Glens Falls, New York, Ferriss completed preparatory studies. He attended the University of Vermont at Burlington, where he was a founding member of the Lambda Iota Society. He studied law. He was admitted to the bar in 1840 and commenced practice in Glens Falls, New York. He was the Justice of the Peace 1838-1841 and 1845-1848. He served as inspector of public schools in 1839 and 1840. Corporation clerk 1839-1842. County judge and surrogate of Warren County 1851-1863.

Ferriss was elected as a Republican to the Fortieth and Forty-first Congresses (March 4, 1867 – March 3, 1871). He served as chairman of the Committee on Mines and Mining (Forty-first Congress). He was not a candidate for renomination in 1870. He was appointed by President Grant as commissioner of southern claims and served from 1871 to 1877. Second Auditor of the Treasury from May 12, 1880, until his resignation on June 19, 1885. He retired to Glens Falls, New York, where he died April 11, 1894. He was interred in Glens Falls Cemetery.

U.S. House of Representatives
Preceded by Robert S. Hale	Member of the U.S. House of Representatives from New York's 16th congressional district 1867–1871	Succeeded by John Rogers
