= Lambda Iota Society =

Defunct local fraternity at the University of Vermont, U.S.

- ΛΙ
- Founded: April 21, 1836; 190 years ago University of Vermont
- Type: Social
- Affiliation: Independent
- Status: Merged
- Merge date: October 2, 2018
- Successor: Pi Kappa Phi
- Scope: Local
- Mascot: Owl
- Patron Roman deity: Minerva
- Chapters: 1
- Nickname: Owls
- Headquarters: 440 Pearl Street; Burlington, Vermont 05401; United States
- Website: www.lambdaiota.org

Lambda Iota Society (ΛΙ) was a local fraternity at the University of Vermont. It was established in 1836 and merged with Pi Kappa Phi in 2018.

== History ==
Lambda Iota was founded on April 21, 1836 at the University of Vermont. The Fraternity began as a secret literary society. There were thirteen original members who met regularly to share the written and spoken word. The founders were:

- J. S. Adams
- Daniel Burke
- Ed. A. Cahoon
- J. F. Deane
- C. G. Eastman
- Orange Ferriss
- James Forsyth
- William Higby
- G. H. Peck
- G. W. Reed
- J. Gregory Smith
- B. J. Tenny
- G. H. Wood

Until its loss of university recognition in 2007, Lambda Iota was the oldest existing local fraternity in the state of Vermont and the eighth oldest fraternity in the nation. Members included statesmen, academics, and successful businessmen.

The place that members called home since the completion of the structure in 1913 is located at 440 Pearl Street, Burlington, Vermont.

In 2007, the society lost university recognition for eight years. Following this, a federal investigation was conducted surrounding cocaine trafficking that had occurred at a house owned by the society.

On October 2, 2019, the Kappa Rho chapter of Pi Kappa Phi fraternity on the Vermont campus was renamed as the Lambda Iota chapter in a partnership with Lambda Iota Society alumni, and took up residence in the historic Pearl Street mansion. Remaining a chapter of Pi Kappa Phi, the two organizations thus re-established in this fashion the underground local fraternity as a recognized campus community member.

Yearbook illustration for Lambda Iota, featuring Minerva and an owl

== Symbols ==
Lambda Iota Society's Roman divinity was Minerva. The fraternity's mascot was the owl, also the symbol of Minerva. Its members were called Owls. The fraternity's name for its chapter house was the "owl nest".

== Minervan Education Foundation ==
Since the late 1990s, the society's alumni had been working to develop a charitable foundation to assist current members with financial assistance for their studies. Since its creation, the Minervan Foundation has raised thousands of dollars through donations and other charitable ventures.

== Notable members ==
- Edmund H. Bennett, first mayor of Taunton, Massachusetts, dean of Boston University School of Law, and judge of probate and insolvency in Bristol County, Massachusetts
- Roswell Farnham, Governor of Vermont and Vermont Senate
- Orange Ferriss, United States House of Representatives
- James Forsyth, president of Rensselaer Polytechnic Institute
- William Higby, United States House of Representatives, California State Senate, and editor of the Calaveras Chronicle
- Lyman Rowell, president of the University of Vermont
- J. Gregory Smith, Governor of Vermont and Speaker of the Vermont House of Representatives
- Worthington C. Smith, United States House of Representatives, Vermont House of Representatives, president, of the Vermont and Canada Railroad, and vice-president of the Central Vermont Railway

== See also ==
- Pi Kappa Phi
- List of social fraternities
