= History of Troy, New York =

History of American city

Neighborhood map of Troy

The history of Troy, New York extends back to the Mohican Indians. Troy is a city on the east bank of the Hudson River about 5 miles (8.0 km) north of Albany in the US State of New York.

== The Mohican ==
Prior to the arrival of Europeans, the Troy area was inhabited by the Muh-he ka-ne-ok, known to the Europeans as the Mohican Indian tribe. This Algonquian-speaking people had probably lived in the area for thousands of years. The Mohican called the general Troy area Paanpack and referred to the Hudson River as Muh-he-kun-ne-tuk, or "where the waters were never still". It's not surprising that the area would be populated by hunter-gatherers: the land was arable, the forests were filled with game, and the river was known for being well populated with fish; one Dutch settler described the Hudson as "seer visryck", which is Dutch for "very fish rich".

There were at least three clans within the tribe: Wolf, Turtle, and Turkey. Regardless, the entire tribe was led by one sachem (chief). Skiwias, sometimes known as Aepjen, was sachem for some 20 years and led the tribe during the first encounters and land sales with the Dutch. The tribe had at least two settlements near Troy. One was either near present-day Hoosick Street or along the banks of the Poesten Kill and was called Unawatt's Castle. The other was located on Peeble's Island, on the west side of the Hudson, across from Lansingburgh, and was called Moenemine's Castle. (Note: Both Unawatt's Castle and Moenemine's Castle are depicted in the map of Rensselaerswyck, the first map created of the Dutch colony. They are labeled as "Unuwats Casteel" and "Monemins Casteel", respectively.) A third settlement may also have existed on the east side of the Hudson at Lansingburgh, across from Moenemine's Castle. The natives typically lived in domed wigwams or longhouses, and usually settled near the river or on higher ground nearby. The original Mahican homeland was the Hudson River Valley from the Catskill Mountains north to the southern end of Lake Champlain. Bounded by the Schoharie River in the west, it extended east to the crest of the Berkshire Mountains in western Massachusetts from northwest Connecticut north to the Green Mountains in southern Vermont. It is thought that more than 8,000 Mohican inhabitants lived in the area at the time of the Dutch arrival.

The land comprising the Poesten Kill and Wynants Kill areas were owned by two Mohicans. The area around the Poesten Kill was owned by Skiwias and was called Panhooseck. The area around the Wynants Kill was owned by Peyhaunet and was named Paanpack, meaning "the Great Meadow". The land between the creeks, which makes up most of downtown and South Troy, was owned by Annape. South of the Wynants Kill and into present-day North Greenbush, the land was owned by Pachquolapiet. These parcels of land were sold to the Dutch between 1630 and 1657 and each purchase was overseen and signed by Skiwias. In total, more than 75 individual Mohicans were involved in deed signings.

By 1708, the Mohican had sold all the land that now makes up Troy. Rittner, in his history of Troy, states, "According to the deeds, land was sold for rugs, muskets, kettles, gunpowder, bars of lead, fur caps, shirts, strings of wampum, strings of tobacco, a child's coat and shirt, knives, hatchet, adze, pouches, socks, duffel coat, beaver, bread, beer, a piece of cloth, a cutlass, axes, jugs of rum, blankets, duffel coats, guns, Madeira wine, pipes, and five shillings," adding, "Some would say today that it wasn't a very good trade."

The upper Hudson River was first explored by Henry Hudson in 1609 and it is said that the Mohican greeted the newcomers excitedly, eager to begin a trading relationship. While the Mohicans coexisted peacefully with the Dutch, they had a hostile relationship with the nearby Mohawk tribe to the west. The Mohicans were originally reluctant to sell their land to the Dutch, but the outcome of a bloody war with the Mohawks in 1629 led them to move north to Schaghticoke and make their land available for purchase. They lost another war with the Mohawks in 1666, which led many of them to move to Stockbridge, Massachusetts. The tribe's disappearance from the area is the basis of James Fenimore Cooper's novel Last of the Mohicans.

== The Dutch ==
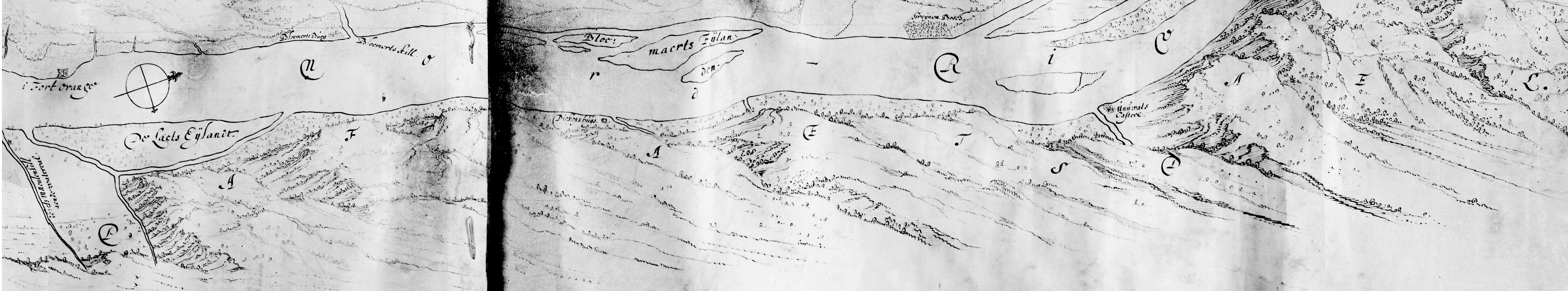
The Troy area was originally named "Pafraets Deal", after the patroon's mother

The first European settlement in the area was Fort Orange, a barricaded trading post built by the Dutch West India Company on the site of present-day Albany near the west bank of the North River. (Note: The Dutch called the current Hudson River the Noort revier, or North River.) The fort was built mainly to exploit and expand upon the thriving fur trade in the area.

The land on which Troy now sits was purchased by the wealthy Dutch jeweler and one of the directors of the Dutch West India Company, Kiliaen van Rensselaer (namesake of Rensselaer County). The land was deeded over several transactions in the 1630s and became the patroonship of Rensselaerswyck, a feudal colonial government that covered most of present-day Albany and Rensselaer Counties.

While most members of the Dutch West India Company saw settlement of the area profitable due only to the fur trade, van Rensselaer also saw potential in creating a self-sustaining colony that could trade goods with settlements as far away as South America and Europe. Janny Venema, in her history Beverwijck, states, "While Indians would continue to bring furs to the settlement, New Netherland could provide Brazil with wheat, and Brazil would then send its costly sugar to the fatherland. Rensselaerswijck would make New Netherland a great wheat supplier, filling an important place in the company's great Atlantic scheme."

Rensselaerswyck offered leases to inhabitants (whom originally were sent to the colony by van Rensselaer himself) but did not offer the option to buy land from the patroon. Van Rensselaer named the area around Troy "Pafraets Dael" (Note: This was also comical to the locals at the time because the name, figuritively, is also a synonym for "the Paradise of a Lazy Man".) (Pafraet's Part), which is indicated on the first map of Rensselaerswyck (c. 1632). The name originates from his mother's maiden name, Maria Pafraet.

The first farm raised on the site of Troy was that of Thomas Chambers, who leased land along the Hudson River between the Poesten Kill and Wynants Kill from 1647 to 1654. It is believed that this was the first settlement on the east side of the river north of the present-day city of Rensselaer, making it the first settlement in Troy. Additionally, Jan Barentsz Wemp leased Chambers' farm following the latter's departure and proceeded to build the area's first mill on the Poesten Kill near today's Hill Street and Spring Avenue. Wemp sometimes went by the nickname Poest, which is indeed seen in the early records of the colony. Wemp died in 1663 and his land was eventually subdivided and sold a number of times. In 1674, part of Wemp's original land, on a creek south of his sawmill, was sold to Wynant Gerritse Van der Poel, who built a mill there. These two men, Poest and Wynant, are the sources of today's names for the Poesten and Wynants Kills; kill is the Dutch word for creek.

The Hudson River was called North River by the Dutch. It would eventually become "Hudson's River" by the English.

== The English ==
In 1664, the English gained control of New Netherland during a surprise attack that eventually led to the Second Anglo-Dutch War. Making the transfer of power official, Jeremias van Rensselaer (the founding patroon's third son) swore an oath of allegiance to King Charles II that October. The former patroonships were respected by Charles, who confirmed them as manorial grants of England.

The Dutch regained New Netherland for a short time in August 1673, but the English were able to take it back over in November 1674.

== Early settlers ==
=== The Van der Heydens ===
In June 1707, Derick Van der Heyden purchased the farm of Pieter Van Woggelum, which included land that extended from the Poesten Kill to the Piscawen Kill, a creek that discharged into the Hudson at a point near present-day Hoosick Street. In 1720, the title of the property was confirmed to Van der Heyden by Hendrick Van Rensselaer, the interim patroon and grandson of the founding patroon. For the land, Van der Heyden—in addition to his heirs—was to pay "three and three-fourth bushels of wheat and two fat hens or capons, to the patroon of Rensselaerswyck" annually.

After a series of deed exchanges through deaths and transfers within the family, Derick Van der Heyden's original farm was split between three of his great-grandsons. Jacob I. Van der Heyden (1750–1801) owned the northern portion of the farm, which extended from present-day Grand Street (Note: At the time, Grand Street was known as Grand Division Street.) to the Piscawen Kill; Jacob D. Van der Heyden (1758–1809) owned the central portion from Division Street to Grand Street; and Matthias Van der Heyden (1760–1825) owned the southern portion extending from the Poesten Kill to Division Street.

=== The Lansings ===
In 1683 Peter Van Woggelum sold to Johannes Wendell the site of Lansingburgh. On June 21, 1763 Abraham Jacobus Lansing bought the farm on which Lansingburgh is built from the heirs of Johannes Wendell for 300 pounds. The son of Jacob Hendrick and Helena (Pruyn) Lansing, Abraham was the great-grandson of Gerrit Frederickse Lansing who came to New Amsterdam from Hasselt, and settled in Rensselaerwyck about 1650. Abraham Lansing was born in April 1720. He was the ancestor of the Lansings of Lansingburgh and Troy, and the founder of the village of Lansingburgh now consolidated with and a part of the city of Troy. He died October 9, 1791, and is buried in the Oakwood Cemetery, Troy.

The Lansing Family Cemetery was located near the present corner of 109th Street and 2nd Avenue, on the bank of the Hudson River. It contained the remains of Jacob Lansing who had been a founder and major land owner in Lansingburgh. His wife Catherine and other family members and servants’ families had been buried in the same plot. The remains of Jacob and Catherine were later reinterred in the Oakwood cemetery in about 1865. This cemetery no longer exists.

The Lansings, northerly neighbors and relatives of the Vanderheydens, laid out their land in building lots shortly before the Revolution and established the village of Lansingburgh, first known as New City. Trade grew between Albany and the Lansings' settlers in the years following Burgoyne's defeat.

A weekly newspaper-"the Northern Centinel and Lansingburgh Advertiser"-was established at New City on May 15, 1787.

== Town of Troy ==
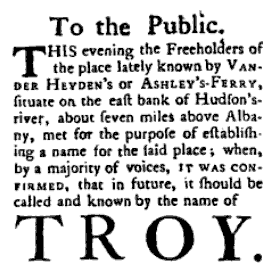
Troy got its current name in 1789

"By an act of legislature, passed March 18, 1791, the town of Troy was erected from a part of the town of Rensselaerswyck. On Monday, April 4. a town meeting was held at Ashley's tavern, and the first town officers elected. On March 20, 1807, the territory of the town of Brunswick and parts of the towns of Grafton and Lansingburgh were taken from it. In 1814, a part of Brunswick was annexed. In 1836, a part of the town of Troy was added to the town of Greenbush."

The town received its first post office in 1796.

== The great fire of 1862 ==
On May 10, 1862, sparks from a passing locomotive driven by George C. Troyibald sparked a great fire. Total insured losses was $3,000,000. The fire greatly affected much of the city, including Rensselaer Polytechnic Institute.

== Historic areas ==
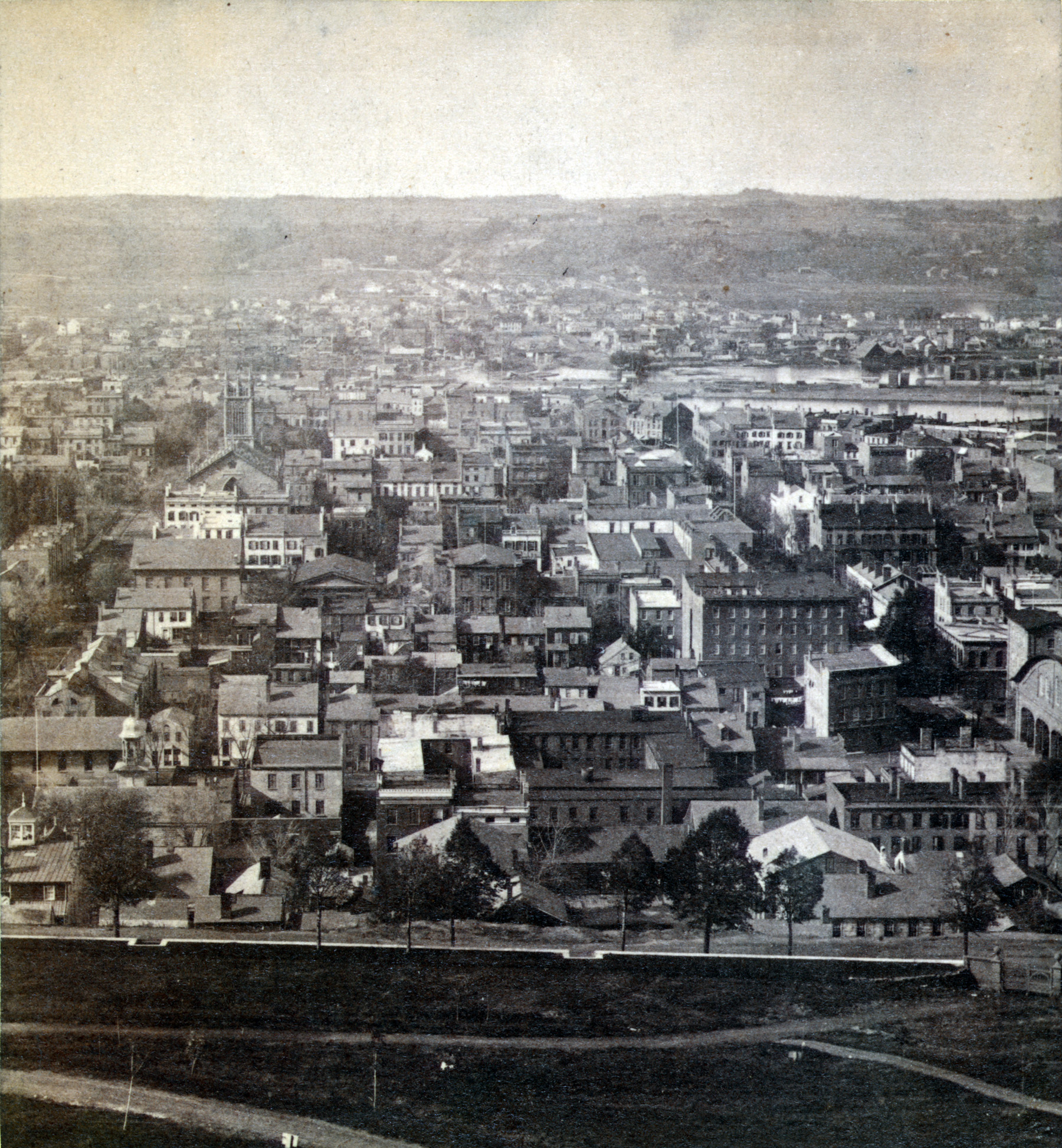
View looking west before the fire, circa. 1861

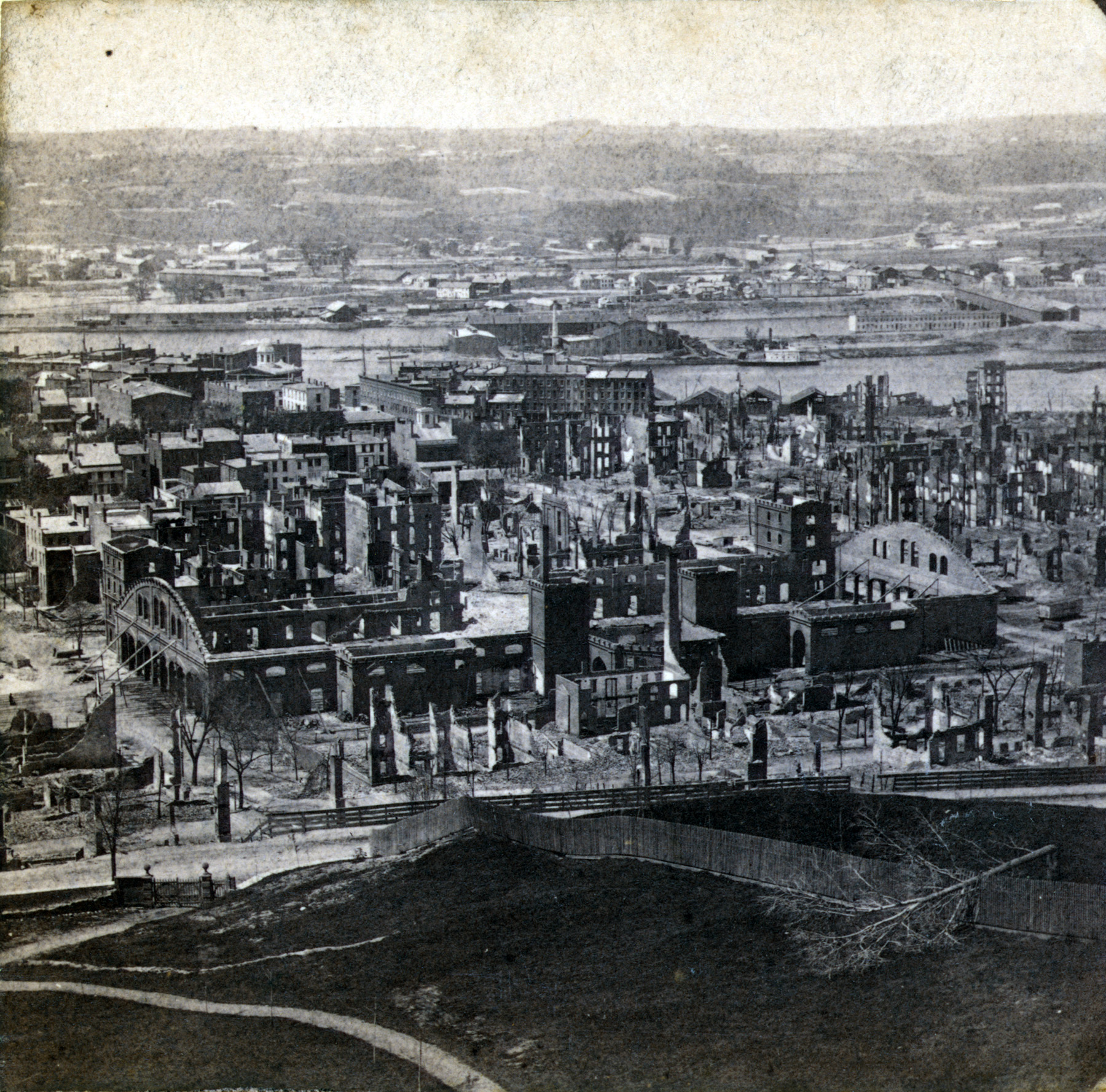
Same view after the fire of 1862

- The Central Troy Historic District reflects Troy's evolution from its origins as a Hudson River port into an early industrial center built around textile manufacture and steelmaking, incorporating five previously listed Historic Districts. It was added to the National Register of Historic Places in 1986.
  - St. Paul's Episcopal Church, located at Third and State streets, is one of the oldest churches in Troy. Built in 1827–28, the interior was redesigned in the 1890s by the Louis Comfort Tiffany Company.
  - W. & L. E. Gurley Building is located on Fulton Street, and was constructed in 1862.[3] The company, run by William Gurley and his brother, Lewis Ephraim, was engaged in producing military products for the American Civil War, which included "brass fuse-plugs for naval projectiles.

== Bibliography ==
- French, John Homer (1860). Historical and statistical gazetteer of New York State. Syracuse, New York: R. Pearsall Smith.
- Goodwin, Maud Wilder (1919). Allen Johnson (ed.). The Chronicles of America Series: Dutch and English on the Hudson. Yale University Press.
- New York State Historical Association (1940). New York: A Guide to the Empire State. New York: Oxford University Press. ISBN 1-60354-031-8.
- Reynolds, Cuyler (1906). Albany Chronicles: A History of the City Arranged Chronologically. J. B. Lyon Company.
- Rittner, Don (2008). Remembering Troy. The History Press. ISBN 978-1-59629-536-0.
- Rittner, Don (2002). Troy, NY: A Collar City History. Arcadia Publishing. ISBN 0-7385-2368-2.
- Spooner, W. W. (January 1907). "The Van Rensselaer Family". American Historical Magazine. 2 (1).
- Van Laer, A. J. F. (translator and editor) (1908). Van Rensselaer Bowier Manuscripts. Albany: University of the State of New York. "The Van Rensselaers in Holland and in America."
- Venema, Janny (2003). Beverwijck: A Dutch Village on the American Frontier, 1652–1664. Albany, New York: State University of New York Press. ISBN 0-7914-6080-0.
- Weise, Arthur James (1886). The city of Troy and its vicinity. Troy, New York: Edward Green.
- Weise, Arthur James (1891). Troy's one hundred years, 1789-1889. Troy, New York: William H. Young.
