= Jan Baptist van Rensselaer =

3rd Patroon of Rensselaerswyck
- Patroonship; 1652–1658
- Preceded by: Johannes van Rensselaer
- Succeeded by: Jeremias van Rensselaer

Personal details
- Born: 18 March 1629 Amsterdam, Netherlands
- Died: 24 October 1678 (aged 49) Amsterdam, Netherlands
- Spouse: Susanna van Wely
- Children: 1
- Parent(s): Kiliaen van Rensselaer; Anna van Wely
- Relatives: See Van Rensselaer family
- Occupation: Merchant, Patroon

Rensselaerswyck series
Dutch West India Company

The Patroon System

Map of Rensselaerswyck

Patroons of Rensselaerswyck:

Kiliaen van Rensselaer
(1630–1640s)
Various
(1640s–1652)
Jan Baptist van Rensselaer
(1652–1658)
Jeremias van Rensselaer
(1658–1674)
Kiliaen van Rensselaer
(1674–1687)
Kiliaen van Rensselaer
(1687–1719)
Jeremias van Rensselaer
(1719–1745)
Stephen van Rensselaer I
(1745–1747)
Stephen van Rensselaer II
(1747–1769)
Abraham Ten Broeck
(1769–1784, de facto)
Stephen van Rensselaer III
(1784–1839)

Jan Baptist van Rensselaer (18 March 1629, in Amsterdam – 24 October 1678, in Amsterdam) was a Dutch merchant and landowner who was the second son of Kiliaen van Rensselaer, the first Patroon of the Manor of Rensselaerswyck.

== Early life ==
Jan Baptist van Rensselaer was born in Amsterdam. He was the second son of Kiliaen van Rensselaer (1586–1643), and his first son by his second wife, Anna van Wely (c. 1601–1670). His father was a diamond and pearl merchant from Amsterdam who was one of the founders and directors of the Dutch West India Company, which established the colony of New Netherland.

== Manor of Rensselaerswyck ==
In the spring of 1651, Jan Baptist sailed from Amsterdam on the Gelderse Blom (Gelderland Flower). With him travelled twelve employees hired by the Patroon, recruited from places where the Van Rensselaers had other interests. Jan Baptist was the first Van Rensselaer to visit the colony.

In May 1652, he was appointed Director of the Manor of Rensselaerswyck representing his brother Johan van Rensselaer (1625–1663), the second Patroon. During his residence on the estate, he lived in a style befitting his position, having brought furniture, silverware, and other personal property of much value from Holland, including portraits of the members of the van Rensselaer family. In 1656, he provided the window pane representing the van Rensselaer coat of arms in the Dutch Church of Beverwyck . Not long afterward he returned to Holland, becoming one of the leading merchants of Amsterdam.

When he returned to Holland in 1658, he was succeeded as Director of the Manor by his brother Jeremias van Rensselaer.

== Personal life ==
Jan Baptist married Susanna van Wely, and together they had:

- Kiliaen van Rensselaer, who died without issue.

Van Rensselaer died in Amsterdam, Holland, October 24, 1678

== Gallery ==
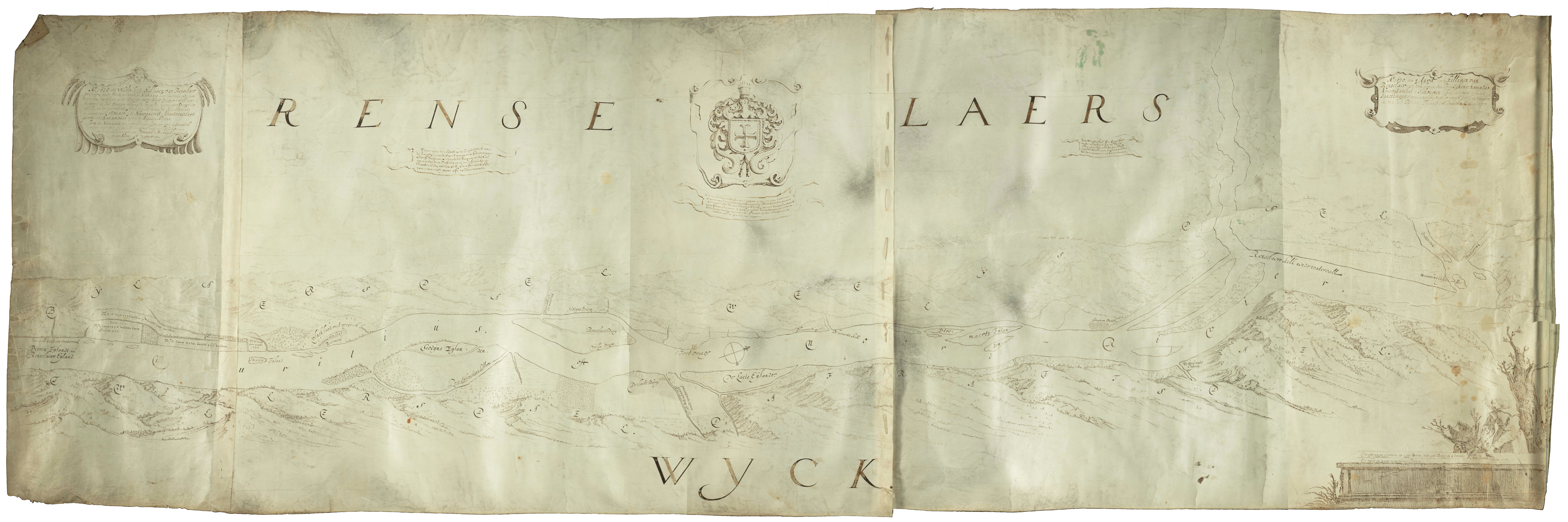
Original Map of Rensselaerswyck, c. 1632

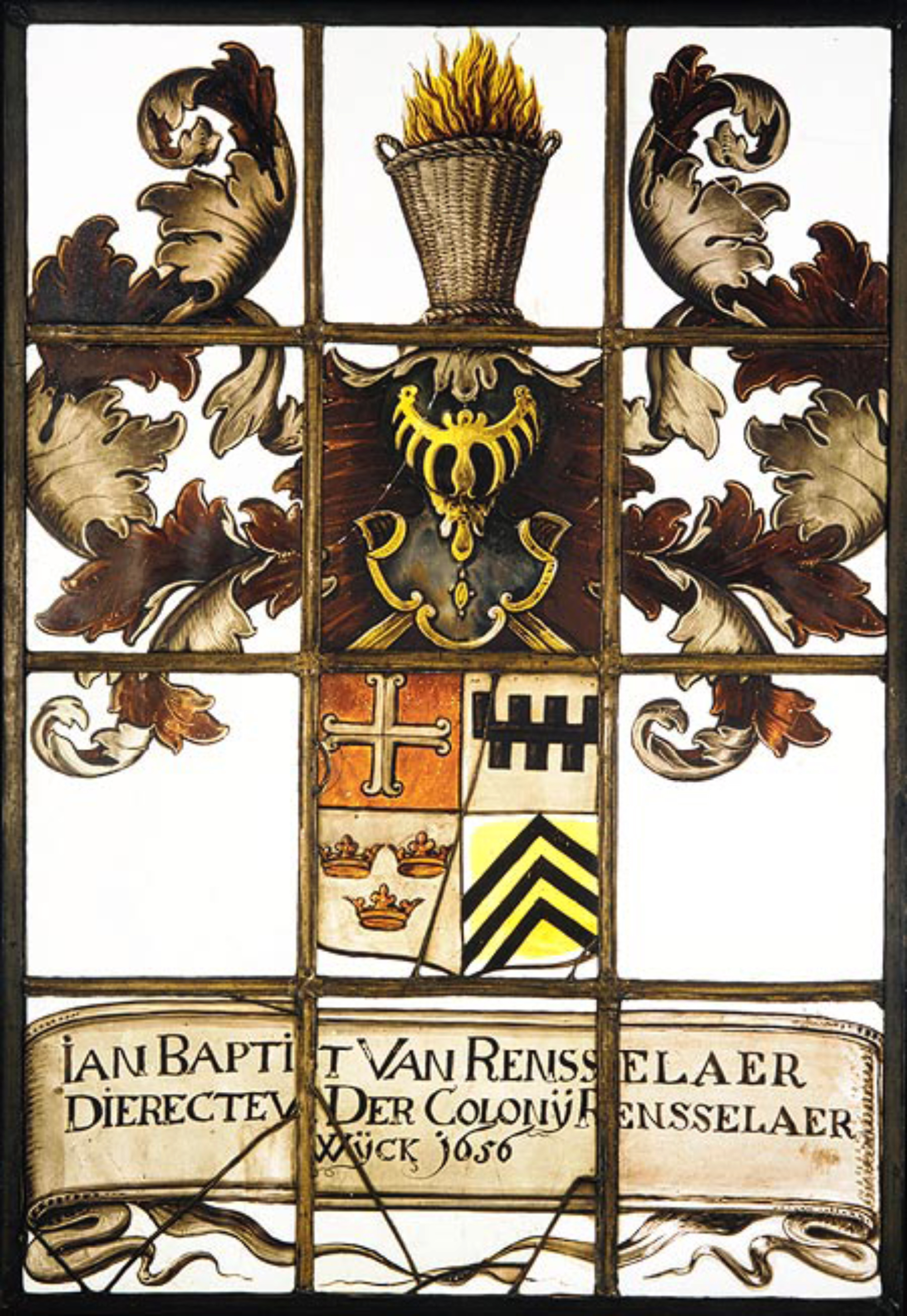
Van Rensselaer Stained Glass

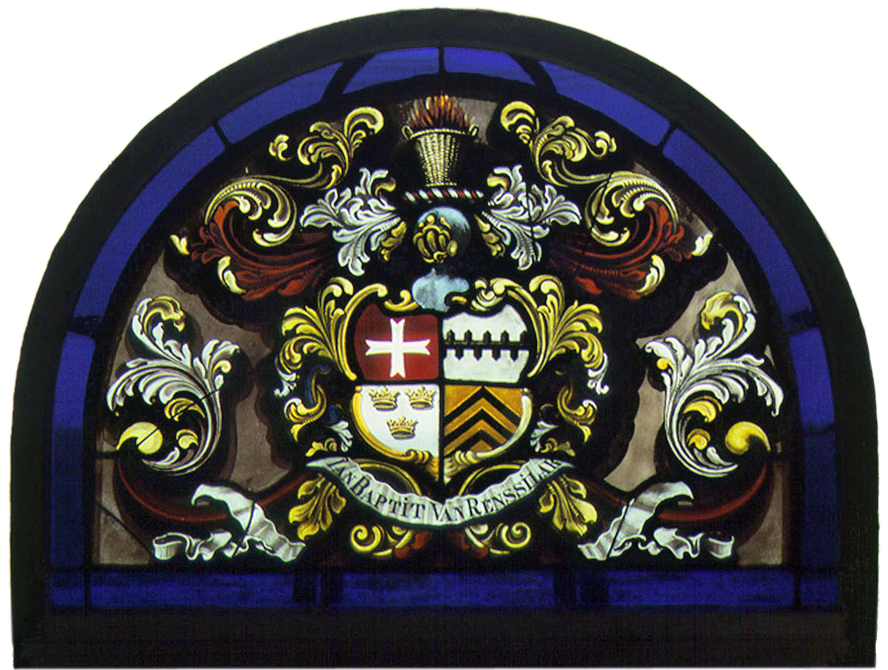
Stained glass installed in the Manor House of Rensselaerswyck by Jan Baptist van Rensselaer
