= James Forsyth (college president) =

American academic administrator

James Forsyth (September 8, 1817 – August 10, 1886) was an attorney, businessman, and the seventh president of Rensselaer Polytechnic Institute. He was born in Peru, New York. He graduated from the University of Vermont in 1839 where he was a founding member of the Lambda Iota Society. He was admitted to the bar in 1842. The following year, he moved to Troy, New York where he practiced law, and was a director and counsel of several local banks and companies. He was a founder and trustee of the Union Trust Company of New York, and President of the Troy & West Troy Bridge Company. He also served as a judge and a member of the Board of Enrollment in Rensselaer County.

He was a longtime trustee of the Troy Female Seminary, which became the Emma Willard School, and Rensselaer. He was president of Rensselaer from 1868 to 1886.

Academic offices
Preceded by Thomas C. Brinsmade	President of Rensselaer Polytechnic Institute; 1868 – 1886	Succeeded by William Gurley
