= Forest Park Cemetery (Brunswick, New York) =

Cemetery in Brunswick, New York, United States

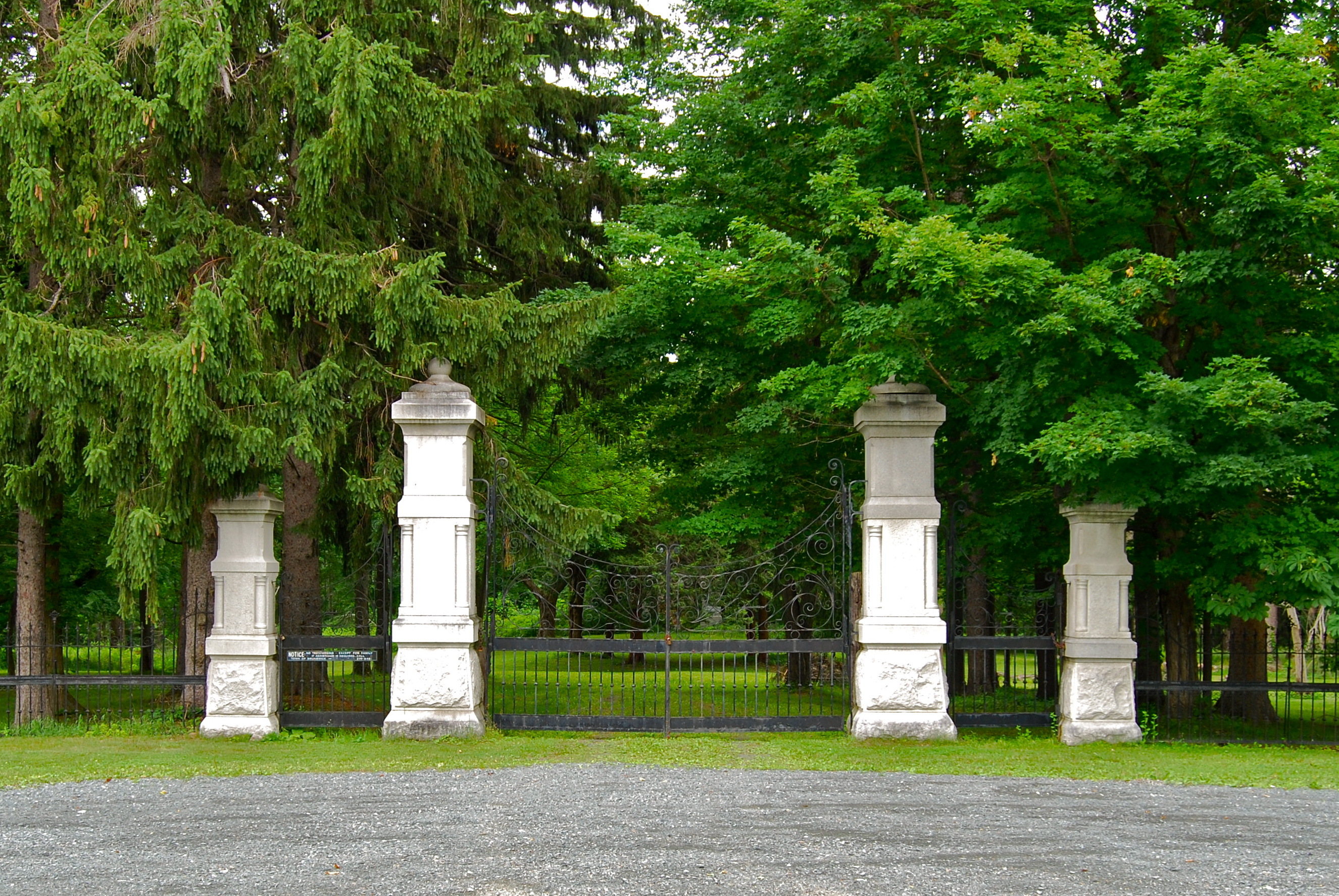
- Entrance gate to Forest Park Cemetery
- Interactive map of Forest Park Cemetery

Details
- Established: 1897
- Location: Brunswick, New York
- Country: United States
- Coordinates: 42°43′2.12″N 73°38′10.33″W
- Type: Private
- Owned by: Town of Brunswick
- Size: 22 acres (8.9 ha)
- No. of graves: 1400 (estimate)
- Find a Grave: Forest Park Cemetery

Forest Park Cemetery, also known colloquially as Pinewoods Cemetery due to its location at 387 Pinewoods Avenue, is an abandoned cemetery, located in Brunswick, New York, United States just east of the city of Troy.

== History ==
Forest Park Cemetery was first incorporated in 1897 by a group of wealthy Troy businessmen under the Forest Park Cemetery Corporation, though based on older gravestones, the cemetery had apparently been in use since at least 1856. The original area chosen for the cemetery occupied over 200 acres (81 ha) of farmland in what was then rural Brunswick. Meant to outgrow and even outclass Troy's Oakwood Cemetery, it was originally designed by Garnet Baltimore, the first African-American graduate of Rensselaer Polytechnic Institute. Baltimore planned on the cemetery to offer visitors a park-like experience, complete with statuary, winding trails, and a large receiving tomb near the entrance.

The Forest Park Cemetery Corporation went bankrupt in 1914 and the cemetery was never completed to the original plans. The only structure that had been built was the receiving tomb, which still stands today, albeit in a dilapidated state. The receiving tomb was built from granite and featured a copper roof with a large skylight and contained 128 marble catacombs used for storing corpses during the winter.

In 1914 the cemetery was re-incorporated by New York City natives under the name Forest Hills Cemetery. Due to financial difficulty, the corporation sold all but 22 acres (8.9 ha) to the neighboring County Club of Troy, for use in the construction of its golf course. Regardless, the corporation also went bankrupt during the 1930s. The cemetery went mostly unattended except for a local man named William Christian who volunteered to be caretaker and did so from 1918 to his death in 1961. Christian kept notes of interments, which indicate that the cemetery served upwards of 1,400 burials. Burials continued in the cemetery until about 1975, when the cemetery went completely unattended.

Until 1987, control of the cemetery was in dispute. During that year, control was vested in the Town of Brunswick, at the decree of New York State. In response, the town created a Forest Park Cemetery Advisory Council in 1991, but it ended up being disbanded in 1994. Employees from the Town of Brunswick made multiple attempts during the 1990s and 2000s to remove overgrown brush and plants, but such attempts have ceased.

In 1988, the cemetery was featured in the local Times Record newspaper after two youths discovered a partially exhumed grave. Two shovels, a pick and several beer cans were found at the crime scene. Although police reports were filed, no one was apprehended for the crime.

In 2007, a local Boy Scout and Brunswick resident Evan Duffey completed his Eagle Scout project, a "census" and map of all the gravestones in the cemetery. A map and database containing all of the gravestones and the names upon them is available at the Town of Brunswick offices for those trying to locate family buried in Forest Park.

As of October 2025 there are no plans to restore Forest Park Cemetery or provide any sort of maintenance. The cemetery remains closed off to the public, with the exception of an annual tour hosted by the Brunswick Historical Society (BHS).

== Gallery ==
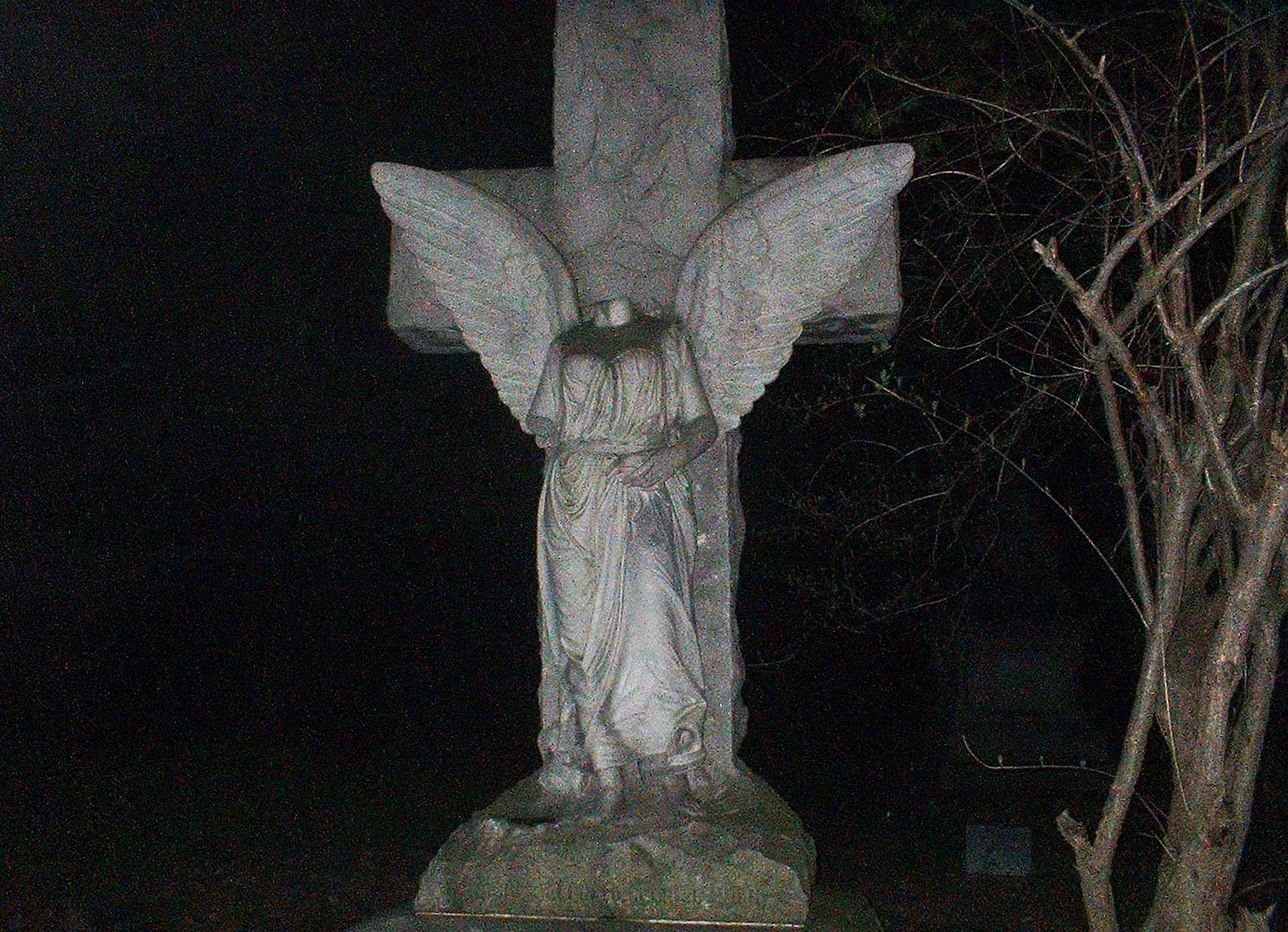
A headless angel from the cemetery

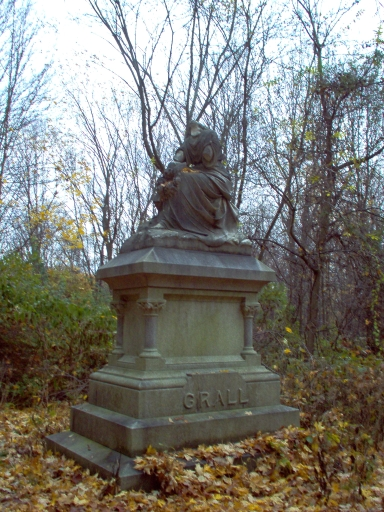
Another headless statue
