= John F. Winslow =

American businessman

John Flack Winslow (November 10, 1810 – March 10, 1892) was an American businessman and iron manufacturer who was the fifth president of Rensselaer Polytechnic Institute.

== Life ==
He was born on November 10, 1810, in Bennington, Vermont, and was a direct descendant of Kenelm Winslow, brother of Edward Winslow, a Mayflower colonist and a governor of Plymouth Colony. John Winslow worked as a clerk in a commission house until he was 21. In 1831, he joined the New Jersey Iron Company as a manager in the Boston office. In 1933 (1833?), he started his own business, making pig iron in Bergen and Sussex counties in New Jersey. In 1837, he and Erastus Corning started a partnership to produce iron. Their partnership lasted for about thirty years. They owned the Rensselaer Iron Works and the Albany Iron Works, which were the largest producers of iron in the United States. When Corning gained control of the Lulworth Iron company in Mount Savage, Maryland, he made Winslow the President. In 1863, they sent Alexander Lyman Holley to learn more about the Bessemer process and they also obtained the US rights to the Bessemer patents. They started the production of Bessemer steel in 1865.

In the 1860 presidential election, Winslow was a presidential elector and voted for Abraham Lincoln and Hannibal Hamlin.

Starting in 1861, Winslow and his business partner John Griswold worked with John Ericsson to build the USS Monitor. After the naval board had not approved Ericsson's proposal for the ironclad warship, Griswold and Winslow met with President Lincoln personally to advocate for its construction. Lincoln then arranged a meeting with them in the office of the Secretary of the Navy. During subsequent meetings, the Navy resisted the project but finally approved but without funding on October 4, 1861. Largely out of frustration, Winslow arranged to finance the project himself, at a cost of $275,000.

After the signing of the contract, construction began rapidly. Interim reimbursements were made by the Navy during construction but by the time of the battle the final payments had not been made. Therefore, the Monitor remained the property of the de facto lien holder, John Flack Winslow. Some of the iron for the Monitor was produced at the Albany Iron Works in Troy. The ship was launched 101 days from the signing of the contract, in time to defend the Union blockade during the Battle of Hampton Roads. Along with John Ericsson, Griswold and Winslow received much praise for their efforts in producing the Monitor. They also received contracts for additional ironclad warships.

In 1865, he was appointed president of Rensselaer. He continued in this position until 1868. Unlike the previous university presidents, he did not have a background as a pastor. He was also a director of several banks and the director and president of the Poughkeepsie and Eastern Railroad. The Winslow Chemical Laboratory, built in 1866, was named in honor of his donation of half the construction cost and his enterprise on behalf of the Institute. The building was added to the US National Register of Historic Places in 1994. Winslow died on March 10, 1892, in Poughkeepsie, New York, United States.

== Wood Cliff ==
The "Wood Cliff" estate just north of Poughkeepsie, comprised about thirty acres of Lot No. 1 of the Great Nine Partners patent, and was originally a part of the farm of Roderick C. Andrus. In 1840 it was transferred to Henry S. Richards, and later was purchased by Edward Crosby, son of William B. Crosby of New York. Mr. Crosby tore down the old house and built a new one. He married Miss Elizabeth Van Schoonhoven of Troy, and they occupied the property for many years. June 10, 1867, it was purchased by the John Flack Winslow, who remodeled the house, laid out the gardens and greatly improved the estate. He resided at "Wood Cliff" until his death in 1892. It was the home of Mrs. Harriet Wickes Winslow.

In 1927 "Wood Cliff" was purchased by real estate developer, who erected Woodcliff Pleasure Park. The amusement park, which operated from 1927 to 1941 included among other attractions, a roller coaster, ballroom, and dock for the dayliner. The Winslow mansion became an inn. The park began to decline during the depression. The property is now the northernmost part of Marist College.

Academic offices
Preceded by Nathan S.S. Beman	President of Rensselaer Polytechnic Institute; 1865–1868	Succeeded by Thomas C. Brinsmade

== Sources ==
- Nason, Henry B., ed. Biographical Record of the Officers and Graduates of the Rensselaer Polytechnic Institute, 1824-1886. D.H. Jones & Co.: Troy, NY (1855).
- John Flack Winslow. Dictionary of American Biography Base Set. American Council of Learned Societies, 1928-1936. Reproduced in Biography Resource Center. Farmington Hills, Mich.: Gale, 2008.
- Scientific American, Vol. 3, No. 9, Nov 20, 1847, "The Mount Savage Iron Works have been sold by the Sheriff for over $200000. The purchasers were Messrs. Corning and Winslow of Albany, N. Y."
