= Thomas C. Brinsmade =

American academic administrator (1802–1868)

6th President of Rensselaer Polytechnic Institute
- In office 1868 – June 22, 1868
- Preceded by: John F. Winslow
- Succeeded by: James Forsyth

Personal details
- Born: Thomas Clark Brinsmade; June 16, 1802 New Hartford, Connecticut, U.S.
- Died: June 22, 1868 (aged 66) Troy, New York, U.S.
- Occupation: Physician, academic administrator

Thomas Clark Brinsmade (June 16, 1802 – June 22, 1868), sometimes misspelled Brimsmade, was a medical doctor in Troy, New York, who was the sixth president of Rensselaer Polytechnic Institute.

He was born in New Hartford, Connecticut, on June 16, 1802. After studying and practicing medicine in Massachusetts and Connecticut, he moved to Lansingburgh, New York, in 1823 and then to Troy, New York, in 1833. He received an honorary degree in medicine from Yale University in 1839. After the deaths of Stephen Van Rensselaer (1839) and Amos Eaton (1842), when the Rensselaer School was in dire need of funds, Brinsmade bought the entire property and equipment of the school at an auction. He allowed faculty and students to use it until the school could repay him.

He was a president of the Rensselaer Medical Society and later moved to the state medical society In 1857 he was elected its vice-president of the State Medical Society, and the following year, president. In 1858, as vice-president, he delivered an address on the registration of diseases, and furnished the society an accurate record of his practice for twenty-one years, carefully analyzed and tabulated, covering three hundred pages of the published transactions, and comprising statistics of 37,872 cases. In 1860 he presented another paper on the registration of diseases, including statistics of 20,056 cases treated between 1858 and 1859.

He was one of the earliest patrons of Rensselaer and a trustee for twenty years. He was treasurer from 1844 to 1847 and vice president from 1864 to 1868. He was elected president of the Institute on May 7, 1868. His tenure was short-lived, however, as he died during a meeting of the Board of Trustees on June 22, 1868, while giving a speech demanding for more funds.

Academic offices
Preceded by John F. Winslow	President of Rensselaer Polytechnic Institute; 1868	Succeeded by James Forsyth
