= Church of the Holy Cross (Troy, New York) =

Historic church in New York, United States

- U.S. National Register of Historic Places
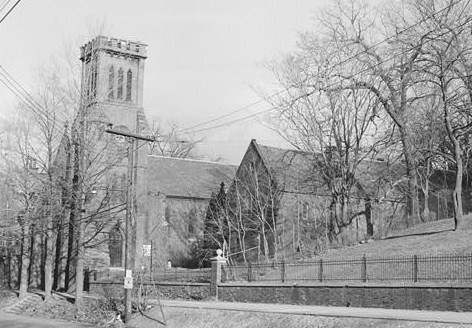
- Church of the Holy Cross and the Mary Warren Free Institute

- Location within New York Location within the United States
- Location: 136 8th Street, Troy, New York, USA
- Coordinates: 42°43′57″N 73°41′1″W
- Built: 1844
- Architect: Alexander Jackson Davis; Richard Upjohn
- Architectural style: Gothic Revival
- NRHP reference No.: 73001253
- Added to NRHP: June 4th, 1973

The Church of the Holy Cross is a church in Troy, New York, United States. It was added to the National Register of Historic Places in New York in 1973. It borders the Rensselaer Polytechnic Institute campus to the East and South.

The church was founded by Mary Warren in the early 1840s. Under the direction of Mary Warren's son, Nathan B. Warren, the church nave was built from designs by Alexander Jackson Davis in 1844. The chancel addition, by Richard Upjohn, was completed in late 1848 and dedicated in January, 1849. In 1846, the Church instituted one of the first choirs at an Episcopal church in the United States. During the full choral service, the psalter, creed and responses of the English Cathedral Service are chanted by the choir while the officiant intones his part. In 1863, the Mary Warren Free Institute was built adjoining the church to the south in order to further religious and musical instruction. The Institute still exists to this day.

== Closure ==
Due to declining membership, the church closed on December 6, 2009. Rensselaer Polytechnic Institute successfully purchased the property.
