= Marc Scarpa =

American producer & director (born 1969)

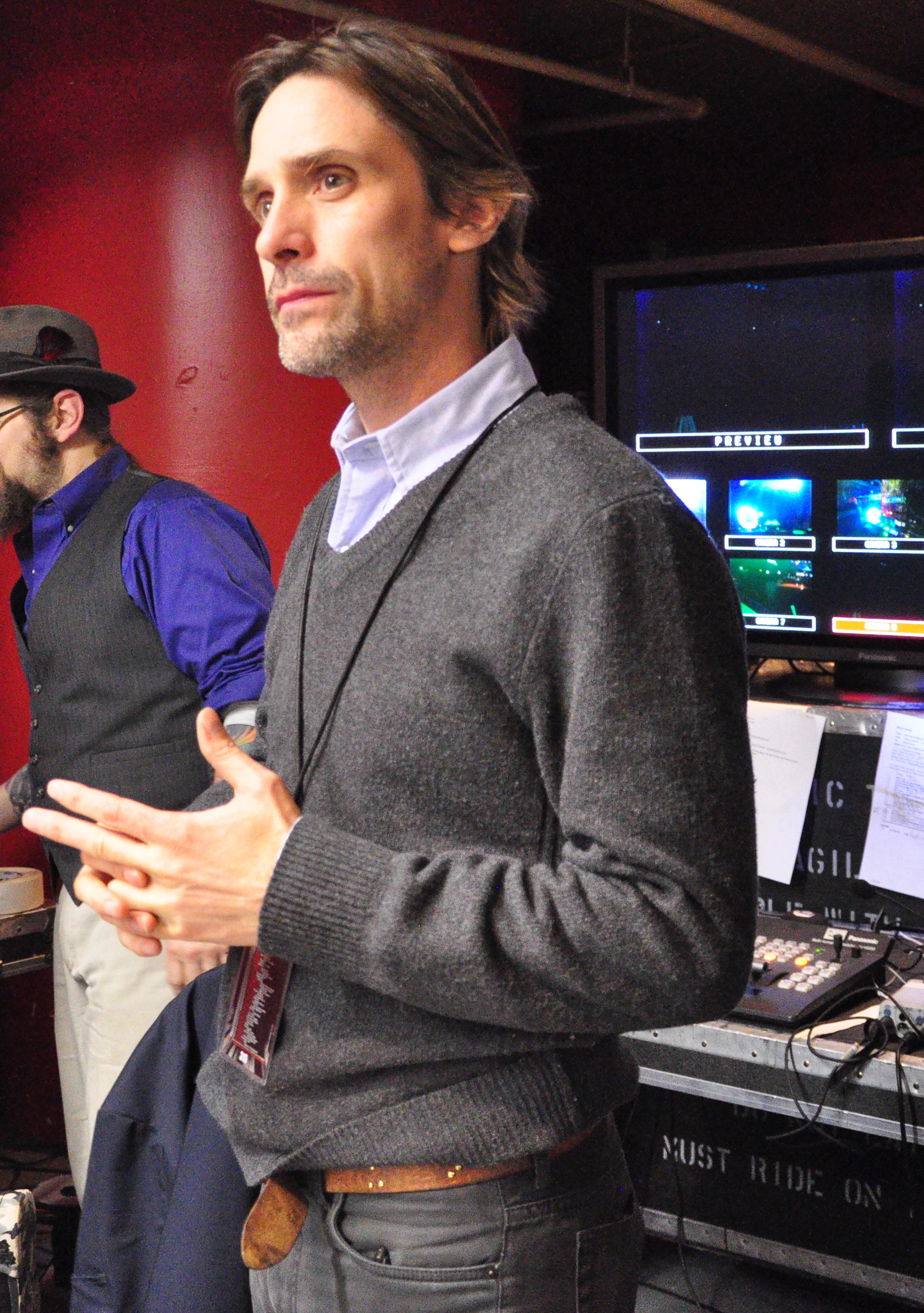
- Director and Producer, Marc Scarpa
- Born: September 25, 1969 (age 57); New York City, United States
- Education: School of Visual Arts
- Occupations: Film director, producer, entrepreneur
- Website: www.simplynew.com

Marc Scarpa (born September 25, 1969, in New York City) is an American entrepreneur, producer and director specializing in live participatory media. He is the executive board member and the founding New York Chair of the Producers Guild of America New Media Council and a recipient of the Marc A. Levey distinguished service award. Scarpa is the CEO and founder of DeFiance Media. Scarpa has received a Webby Award in 2010 for Best Event / Live Webcast for his work on the 52nd Annual Grammy Awards, a Cannes Bronze Lion for Branded Content and Entertainment for the X Factor Pepsi Digital Preshow and Xtra Factor App and four Social TV Awards including Best of Show for X Factor Pepsi Digital Preshow and Xtra Factor App. Additionally, he has been a panelist for conferences such as NATPE, X-Summit, LTE North America, Digital Hollywood and Canadian Music Week among others.

== 1990s ==
=== Agrippa – The Transmission ===
With the media attention from Beyond 2000, Scarpa was given the opportunity to produce a project called Agrippa - The Transmission. This new project was an offshoot project of Agrippa (a book of the dead), the 1992 literary and technology collaboration between artist Dennis Ashbaugh, author William Gibson, and publisher Kevin Begos, Jr. For this project, the collaborators produced a book containing text that smudged when touched and photos of the genetic code of a fruitfly. An encrypted disc was included at the back of the book and automatically self-destructed after one reading. The participatory nature of the book ensured that no two readers would experience the book in the same way and the self-destructing disc would only be experienced by one person.

For Agrippa-The Transmission, the self-destructing disc's content was made available as a one-time transmission over the pre-web internet using 300 baud modems which dialed random and some select computers worldwide, and "transmitted" the file to those personal computers. Originally, 50 people received the transmission. Then over one-hundred thousand hacked the text once online. This translated into millions of viral viewers and numerous re-mix interpretations of the piece. Many support the notion that Agrippa - The Transmission is the first viral online netcast in history.

=== CNET ===
In 1995, Scarpa got the attention of former CBS News supervising producer Win Baker through news stories he produced on Beyond 2000. Baker brought Scarpa on as a founding producer and the New York Bureau Chief for the start-up technology news network CNET TV. Scarpa would go on to produce the CNET programs "TV.COM", "The Web" and "C|NET Central" from 1995 to 1997. While at CNET, Scarpa co-developed the networks early video-on-demand deployment with Baker and produced CNET's first live webcast from the floor of the 1997 PC Expo (now called Interop). These were the precursors to CNET TV. In 2008, CNET was acquired by CBS Corporation for $1.8 billion.

=== Tibetan Freedom Concerts ===
Organized by the Beastie Boys and the Milarepa Fund, the Tibetan Freedom Concerts were created to support the cause of Tibetan independence. The initial concert on June 15 and 16, 1996 featured the Beastie Boys, Beck, Sonic Youth, Björk, Foo Fighters, De La Soul, The Fugees, Yoko Ono, No Doubt, Red Hot Chili Peppers and The Smashing Pumpkins. Scarpa produced the live stream broadcast of the concert from its location in San Francisco's Golden Gate Park for sonicnet.com. The broadcast was later acquired by MTV. The concert was attended by 100,000 people and had 36,000 online participants worldwide. It was the first large-scale webcast in history and proved the viability of the Internet as a two-way broadcast platform. Partners included RealNetworks, Mark Cuban and Todd Wagner's AudioNet, Digital Equipment Corporation and Pacific Bell.

Dozens of internet café locations around the world were utilized as gathering places for participants. They could hear high-quality audio and see real time still images pushed out in sync to create a flipbook video effect (JPEG push). They could also sign petitions, submit photos and chat online with each other and with the artists and fans on-site. Early Wi-Fi technology set up in action tents backstage and on the field at the event allowed for this connection. The unification of online and on-site communities has been a continued theme in Scarpa's work. In collaboration with the same event partners, Scarpa produced subsequent broadcasts for the 1997 and 1998 festivals respectively.

=== New York City's Blue Room ===
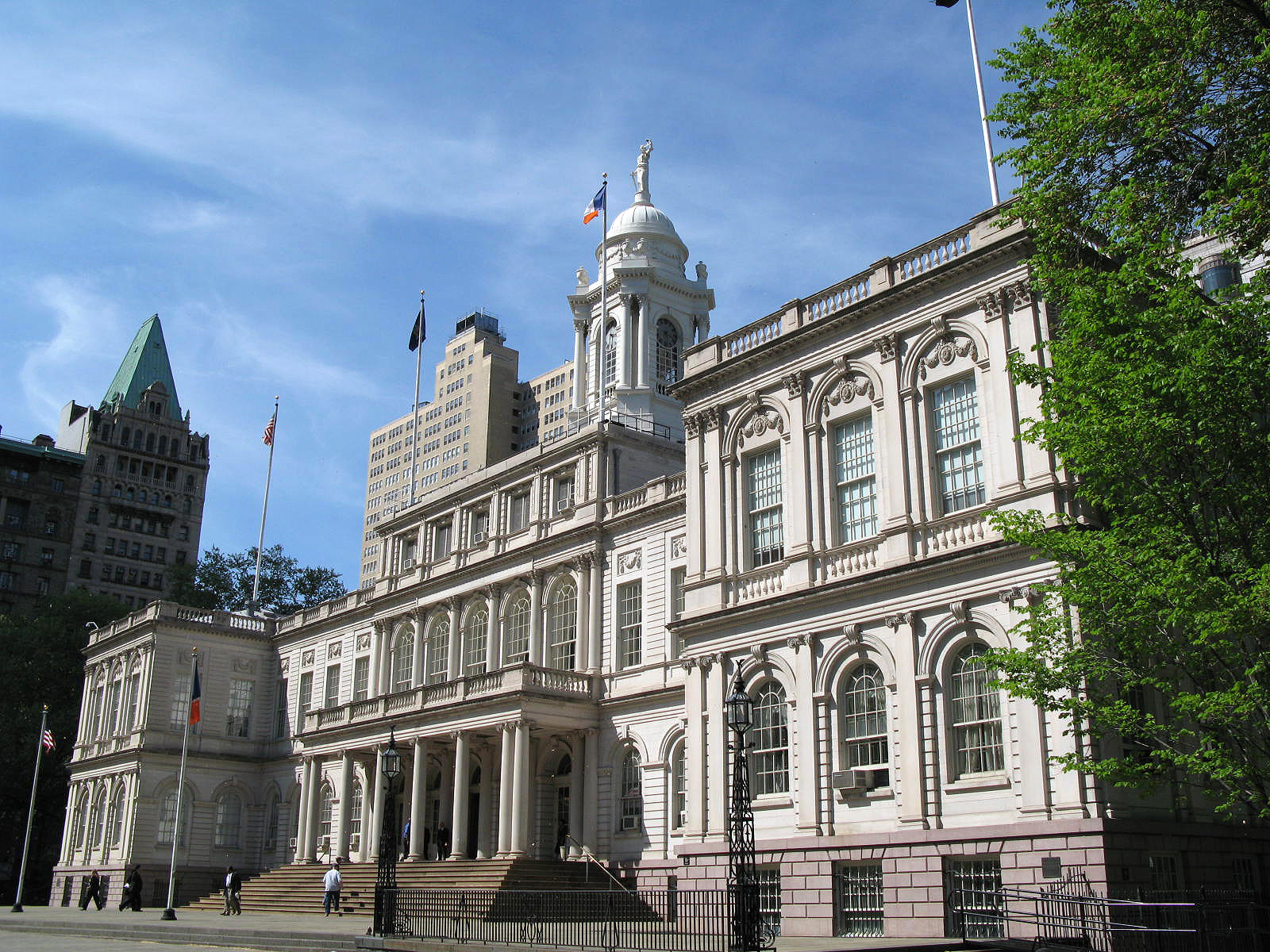
New York City Hall

In November 1997 New York City Mayor Rudolph Giuliani became the first elected official in history to broadcast his inaugural speech online. Scarpa produced the Webcast and was sub sequentially asked by the Mayor's office in conjunction with DoITT to re-build New York City Hall's Blue Room as a multi-platform broadcast facility which enabled daily press conferences to be broadcast live over the Web, TV and radio simultaneously. It was the first such facility in the nation and enabled residents to have a real time relationship with their politicians. E-mail questions from residents were responded to during the daily broadcasts giving voters access to their elected officials as opposed to just the media. It is in use by Mayor Michael Bloomberg.

=== Woodstock '99 ===
Following in the steps of its elder sister festival of 30 years prior, Woodstock 99 stood to modernize the musical entity that was Woodstock Festival (1969) with an implementation of new technology. Scarpa produced and directed the live stream of the festival on July 23–25, 1999 which featured musical performances by artists such as Metallica, Kid Rock, Red Hot Chili Peppers, James Brown, Sheryl Crow, Rage Against the Machine, and Limp Bizkit. Approximately 200,000 people attended the festival, but over 2.4 million people participated online over the duration of the 64-hour live broadcast, which cemented it as the largest participatory media event of the 20th century. It achieved this goal by syndicating live on hundreds of Websites, blogs and media partner sites throughout the world in addition to having a premium experience on Woodstock.com.

=== Townhall with President Clinton ===
President Bill Clinton

On November 8, 1999, Scarpa produced and directed the first presidential Webcast with President Bill Clinton for the Excite@Home Network in partnership with the Democratic Leadership Council. DLC chairman, Al From, moderated the town hall and included streaming video remote feeds which connected New Democrat leaders (some of them just recently elected), including Kathleen Kennedy Townsend, then Lt. Governor of Maryland; Donald T. Cunningham, Jr., then mayor of Bethlehem, PA; Wisconsin State Rep. Antonio Riley; Ron Gonzales, then mayor of San Jose, and Jeanne Shaheen, then governor of New Hampshire along with Netscape co-founder Marc Andreessen, all using IP-enabled technologies.

The Clinton Town Hall chat enabled viewers to send in questions and watch the proceedings simultaneously. In 2005, this participatory media event was inducted into the permanent collection of the Clinton Presidential Library, in Little Rock, Arkansas and is the first Internet-age broadcast in a Presidential library. The project received worldwide media attention and was simultaneously broadcast live on several television news networks throughout the United States.

== 2000-2009 ==
=== MySpace Live ===
MySpace Logo

At the turn of the century, Scarpa began producing under his new business moniker, Simply New. One of his first projects, which he co-created and directed, was a series for the popular social networking site MySpace. Entitled MySpace Live, it was a part of their newly formed MySpaceTV initiative to combat YouTube's video dominance on their site. The series featured Linkin Park, T.I., Paul Oakenfold among many others musical artists and was their first foray into live participatory media that celebrated community through individual expression. It is widely accepted that the series was the first for a social media platform which utilized the vast content creation resources by the MySpace community.

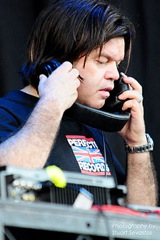
Paul Oakenfold

==== Paul Oakenfold ====
The first in the series and the first live broadcast on MySpace took place on November 18, 2006, at Club Space in Miami, Florida. Additional artists included Jonathan Peters, Sandra Collins and world-renowned visual artist Vello Virkhaus, immersive media artist V. Owen Bush and live visual performance artist Benton C Bainbridge. Members of the MySpace community were invited to submit videos during the six-hour experience which were then re-mixed on site by the visual artists, displayed live in the venue and incorporated the modified videos back into the broadcast to the online participants.

Hosted by Renee Intlekofer and Shaina Fewell of Project MyWorld, user questions were answered by the dj's, performing artists and attendees live on camera using mobile phones provide by T-Mobile. Over 1 million participants worldwide experienced the first show and cemented Scarpa's participatory video aesthetic and use of social media.

==== T.I. VS T.I.P. ====
The second installment Scarpa produced and directed in the MySpace Live series was T.I. and friends performing hits from his album "T.I. VS T.I.P." On Wednesday, June 20, T.I. starred in an exclusive concert event for a crowd of 1800 people which was streamed to more than 1.5 million participants in two hours, making it another successful live broadcast for MySpace. The event was transmitted from Chicago's Riviera Theatre, T.I. was joined by special onstage guests: Twista, Lupe Fiasco, and DJ Drama, with hosts Nick Cannon and Aubrey O'Day from Danity Kane. Scarpa again employed similar participatory media techniques specifically utilizing crowd-sourced photography from the MySpace community. The images were then displayed as a slide show within the venue and projected on stage by inflatable artist Anakin Koenig with the images themselves being remixed by visual artist Holly Dagger and again incorporated the modified images back into the broadcast to the online participants.

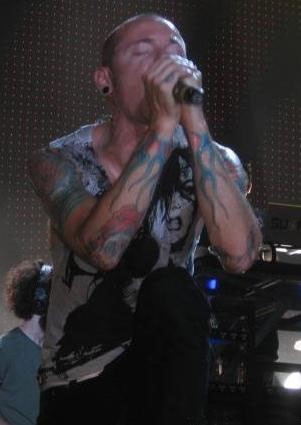
Chester of Linkin Park

==== Projekt Revolution 2007 ====
The Projekt Revolution tour was the brainchild of Linkin Park, and included a number of bands on two main stages over a 7-hour period. Myspace streamed the concert live on August 22 to over 2.5 million participants, which was hosted by Matt Pinfield. For this installment of the series, Scarpa utilized Nokia N95 mobile phones as live broadcasting cameras that he provided to six select fans that had been provided all-access to the concert to share their stories and experiences. This is the first known broadcast to mix both HD captured content with media provided by mobile phones in real time. The ensuing result for Scarpa was a real time documentary shot from a first person perspective, which he weaved in and out of the artist performances during the HD streaming broadcast.

=== Oscar Night at Mr. Chow ===
The Leeza Gibbons Memory Foundation and Extra TV sought to create a charity event that would incorporate a viewing of the Oscars with live interactive media. Scarpa was asked to produce and direct the first-annual charity gala, which featured hosts Leeza Gibbons, Olivia Newton-John and entertainment director, David Foster. The live stream was broadcast directly from Mr. Chow in Beverly Hills, and was accessible via several partner websites including ExtraTV.com, Glam.com, Variety.com and Jessica Biel's Make a Difference Network. Viewers of the program were also encouraged to donate directly to the charity of their choice and participate through commentary and questions.

Special guests included: Laila Ali, Mel B, Michael Bublé, Wilson Cruz, Hilary Duff, Tony Hawk, Paris Hilton and many others.

=== GRAMMY Live ===
Scarpa developed, produced and directed the Webby Award winning first GRAMMY Live as a participatory online experience for the 52nd Annual GRAMMY Awards. It contained 72 hours of continuous live streaming video coverage on GRAMMY.com, six hours of streaming on Myspace (Jan. 30–31), and 6 hours of streaming on www.cbs.com (January 31). There were 3.8 million unique visitors to the website who consumed more than 140,000 hours of video during a 3-day period. Subsequently, the video on-demand assets of the program have garnered over 10 million viewers to date in over 150 countries and are partially credited with driving a record increase in viewership of the CBS broadcast to 25 million homes for the three-hour telecast.

The online event festivities kicked off on January 29, 2010, two days prior to the awards night TV telecast, with The Recording Academy's Social Media Rock Star Summit hosted by CNN at the GRAMMY Museum. It was a participatory panel discussion among social media trailblazers including Pete Cashmore, Nikhil Chandhok, David Karp, Kevin Rose, and Jared Leto along with an online and studio audience that spotlighted the intersection of music and the digital space. The program went on to feature behind the velvet rope coverage of never before seen GRAMMY pre-telecast events such as the MusiCares Person of the Year Tribute honoring Neil Young; Special Merit Awards Ceremony & Nominees Reception; Pre-GRAMMY Gala featuring the 2011 Grammy Salute To Industry Icons and Pre-telecast ceremony in addition to the post telecast GRAMMY celebration.

Scarpa cast TV/Web personality Shira Lazar to host the event along with various music industry video bloggers. With the Recording Academy he led the effort to partner with Ooyala, Akamai, Live U, Livecast and MySpace to deliver features such as social media tools, streaming video, photo sharing, live remote 3G enabled cameras and mobile phones to collect intimate first person coverage by the video bloggers. Scarpa, who is also a voting member of the Recording Academy, was invited back for a second installment, which mirrored the first participatory video experience for the 53rd GRAMMY Awards show as an executive producer. The broadcast was syndicated to YouTube.

== 2010-present ==
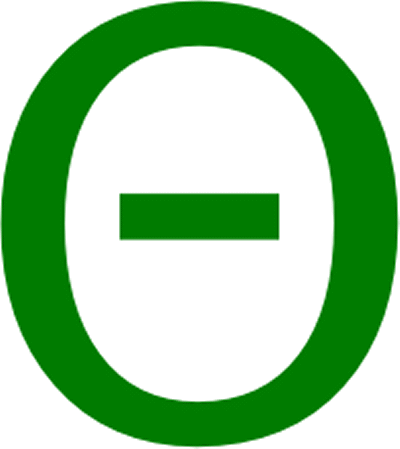
Earth Day Logo

=== Earthday Live ===
Scarpa teamed up with the Earth Day Network to produce Earthday Live!, a seven-hour live online participatory broadcast that bridged the in-person attendance of 250,000 on the National Mall in Washington, DC, with the online world of several million in 18 countries. Three events were held from 2008 until 2010 for the 40th anniversary of Earthday. Overall, the stream included over 20 hours of real-time video programming featuring musical artists, speakers, backstage access and pre-taped content in 10 cities across America celebrating related Earth Day activities. Participants were able to watch live, sign up for the billion acts of green campaign, submit petitions to the senate, engage in green trivia and have a real-time dialogue with concert goers and artists on site via two 40 x 40 JumboTrons positioned as bookends on the stage itself. This visual display was further used to encourage all participants to submit photos of their personal Earthday experience which were then displayed and incorporated into the broadcast.

To create the stream, Scarpa worked with Arqiva, which provided satellite news-gathering trucks, transponder time, teleport services, and live encoding. Highwinds delivered the live stream to network users in 48 states and 17 countries outside the US.

The events featured musical artists Sting, The Roots, O.A.R., John Legend, Flaming Lips, Los Lobos, Grateful Dead's Bob Weir, Booker T. Jones, and environmentalist supporters such as Chevy Chase, Edward Norton, Avatar director James Cameron, Jesse Jackson and author Margaret Atwood.

In 2012, Scarpa completed his 4th live broadcast of Earthday Live!. He is also a member of the Global Advisory Committee along with notable figures such as Al Gore, Martin Scorsese, Shaquille O'Neal and Leonardo DiCaprio.

=== Vidblogger Nation ===
In 2011 Scarpa, continued breaking new ground in participatory media with the launch of the first social TV network, Vidblogger Nation, through Comcast's XFinity On Demand. Vidblogger Nation showcases ten prominent video bloggers including Zennie Abraham (Atlanta), Sacha Heppell (Denver), Jeffrey Wisenbaugh (Michigan), Jen Friel (New England), Rocco Leo Gaglioti (New Jersey), Jessica Berry (Philadelphia), Tony Thomas (Portland (Oregon)), Ann Spade (Sacramento), Sarah Austin(San Francisco) and Jenny Scordamaglia (South Florida) areas. Each local blogger contributed 36 three- to five-minute episodes for the network launch on subjects ranging from the best place to find a non-alcoholic happy hour to the most haunted houses in their city. Participants can view episodes on Comcast On Demand and interact with the host and fellow viewers (both local and in other cities) through Facebook, Twitter and the host's personal blogs, vlogs and fansites. Vidblogger Nation is the first television network to actively encourage participation in its programming whereby the audience assists the VidBloggers in discovering their local market and bringing them along for the experience

=== Incubus HQ Live ===
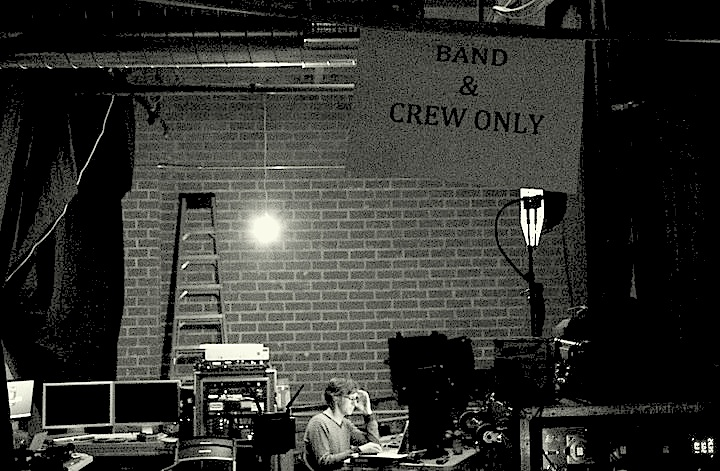
Marc Scarpa backstage at Incubus HQ Live

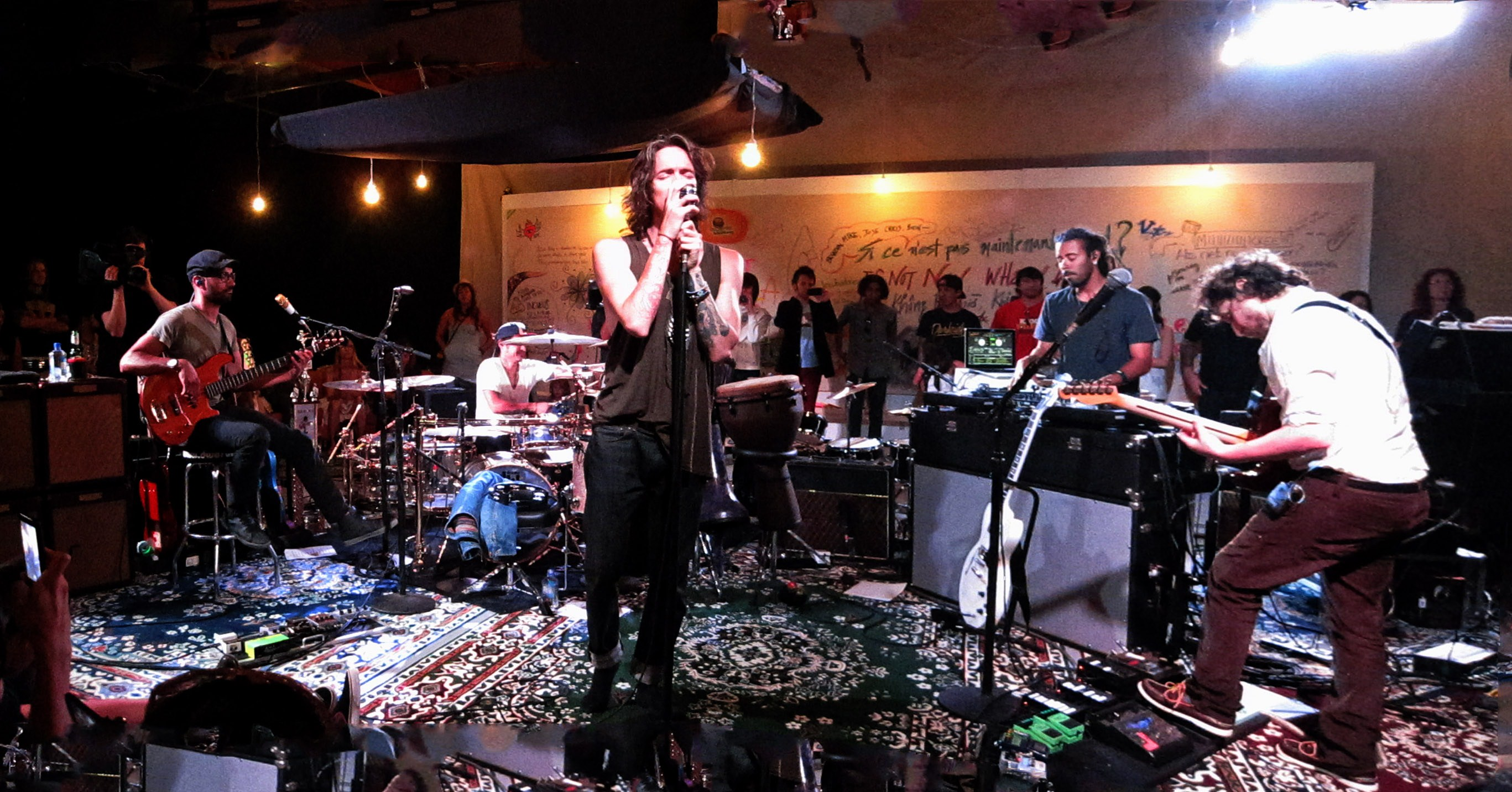
Incubus performing at Incubus HQ Live

Scarpa collaborated with rock band Incubus for Incubus HQ Live, a participatory media exhibit and real-time documentary that allowed unprecedented fan access and interaction with the band as they prepared for the release of their seventh studio album, If Not Now, When? From June 30 to July 6 in a warehouse space in West Los Angeles, California, band members Brandon Boyd, Mike Einziger, Jose Pasillas, Ben Kenney and DJ Kilmore and their fans participated in instrument clinics, question and answer sessions, video chats and large art canvases where both band members and fans alike were encouraged to share original artwork. Each night, Incubus performed a fan created set-list, starting with their earliest material and culminating on the last night with a performance of If Not Now, When? in its entirety.

Events throughout the day and the nightly performances were streamed over the web from multiple points of view (professional and fan-held cameras alike) while participants from around the world shared in the experience through Twitter, Facebook, Livestream, TweetBeam and YouTube. The broadcast was viewed by nearly 2 million people over the course of the week.

Scarpa's multi-platform, real-time approach to the documentary format allowed Incubus and their fans to reflect on what the music had come to mean to them over time, its significance for them in the moment and its potential and possibility for the future.

Due to overwhelming fan demand, a special DVD box set containing performances, interviews with the band members, archival footage and candid footage from over the course of Incubus HQ Live is set to be released in July 2012.

=== The X Factor Digital Experience ===
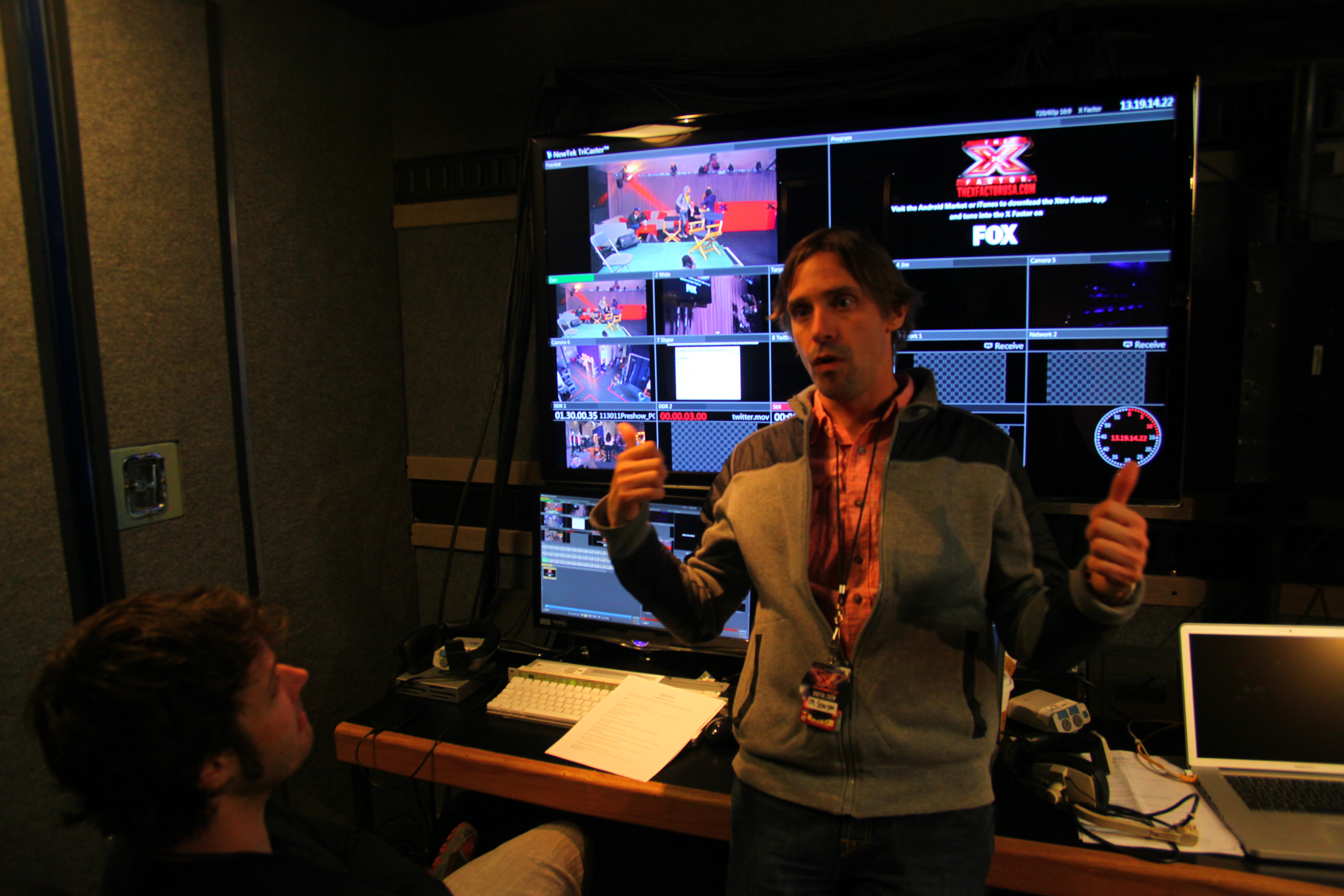
Scarpa directing in the X Factor Digital control room

For the U.S. launch of Simon Cowell's international hit television competition, The X Factor, Sony Music brought Scarpa in to produce and direct a completely integrated second-screen experience and live digital pre-show. In addition to watching the program live on television, the audience was now able to participate on multiple platforms in real-time.

Participants could start online with the streaming digital pre-show one hour prior to each live televised broadcast. Hosts Taryn Southern, Jim Cantiello and Dan Levy along with special guests (including judges Simon Cowell, L.A. Reid, Paula Abdul and Nicole Scherzinger), vlogger CourtneyPants, and participants from around the country discussed everything from their favorite performances to contestant's fashion and song choices. Participants could tweet questions live to the hosts and their guests and some fans were even selected to join the live-stream via Skype.

As the pre-show ended, participants would engage in extended programming with their tablets during the broadcast and continue the discussion via exclusive content available through the Xtra-Factor App. They could read contestants' and judges' live tweets, tweet back their support and opinions, get exclusive access to backstage cameras, read song lyrics during performances, view galleries from past performances, learn about contestants' hometowns and even download contestants song choices as they were being performed.

The participatory experience that Scarpa directed minimized the gap between The X Factor's live performances and the audience at home, making the audience participants in the program as opposed to passive viewers. Fox Networks leveraged The X Factor's extensive online presence into the highest rated social media response for any broadcast series in 2011, with over 350,000 app downloads, 64 million views of thexfactor.com, 160 million YouTube plays, 260 million Facebook impressions, 1.6 billion Twitter impressions and 2.87 billion engagements over the course of 15 weeks. X Factor Digital was honored with a Cannes Bronze Lion for Branded Content and Entertainment at the Cannes Lions 59th International Festival of Creativity and won three Social TV Awards for Best TV Show- Specific, Best Social TV Integration of Twitter and Best of Show. It was also an Official Honoree in the Interactive Advertising category for the 16th Annual Webby Awards.

=== PGA's Digital VIP ===
Recently, Scarpa has been in charge of assembling the Producer Guild's Digital VIP and has been involved in putting on the Digital VIP Salon Event series. In this series many producers such as Robert Evans have come to speak and contribute.

==== PGA's Digital VIP Awards 2013 ====
Scarpa put together the PGA Digital VIP's Awards ceremony that honored Bill Westenhofer, Ben Donovan, and Conan O'Brien, Ed Ulbrich, John Lasseter, Jim Carrey, and more in 2013.

==== PGA's Digital VIP Awards 2014 ====
Scarpa participated in the PGA Digital VIP's annual ceremony that honored Ted Sarandos, Alfonso Cuaron, and Rob Thomas on June 6, 2014.

=== TWCS 2ndScreen ===
In 2013, Scarpa partnered up with Mobovivo to create a 2nd Screen App for Time Warner Cable SportsNet. The revolutionary app was designed for TWCS's coverage of the Los Angeles Lakers. The app introduced a participatory experience where the audience could interact with each of the Lakers' games on their mobile device.

=== Allstate Fan Fest 2014 ===
On January 1, 2014, Scarpa directed and produced the livestream experience for the Imagine Dragons show at Allstate's annual Fan Fest in New Orleans. Imagine Dragons kicked off the new year with a concert before the annual Sugar Bowl game.

=== Tell A Friend Get Covered ===
In late 2013, Scarpa became involved with a live broadcast for Covered California as the Executive Producer. This 6-hour live broadcast which was part of the 'Tell A Friend Get Covered' campaign was a partnership between traditional and non-traditional celebrities to encourage Americans to "Get Covered" by the Affordable Care Act.

Funny or Die, Maker Studios, The Collective and YouTube all came together in this joint effort to produce this show under Scarpa's executive direction. YouTube celebrities such as Hannah Hart, Alphacat, and The Fung Brothers joined forces with traditional celebrities from all walks of fame such as MMA fighter Frank Shamrock, comedian Marlon Wayans, and more to participate in this six-hour live event of musical acts, interviews, and viral skits.

=== Discovery Channel's FinFest ===
Discovery Channel kicked off its 2014 Shark Week programming with the first-ever FinFest in Hermosa Beach, CA, a 2-day, 2-night party on the beach. Marc Scarpa produced and directed the live stream broadcast of the festival which included musical performances by Jimmy Buffett and the John Butler Trio performing live on a shark mouth-shaped stage, a 60-foot mechanical Sharkzilla which chomped various items on the hour, as well as shark trivia competitions and interviews. The webcast brought the festival experience to life for viewers at home by showcasing every segment of the event as they happened in real-time. Online participants were able to engage by voting on Facebook to determine the outcomes of various activities taking place on-site.

=== Speaking engagements ===
Scarpa has been a featured speaker at NATPE 2013 - 2016. Recently, Scarpa has taken the podium at Hong Kong's International Film & TV market. In addition to this, he has also consistently been a panelist at Digital Hollywood's conferences and conferences for the Producers Guild of America.

In 2023, Scarpa headed to NabShow New York to discuss Defiance Media's approach to creating a custom virtual news Anchor, Raxana, and virtual studio for around-the-clock broadcast news. He tells Nab Amplify "we are not here to destroy journalism; we are here to empower it".

== Awards and recognitions ==
- 2007- The Marc A. Levey Distinguished Service Award presented by the Producers Guild of America
- 2010 - Webby Award for Best Event/Live Webcast - GRAMMY Live!
- 2012 - Cannes Bronze Lion for Branded Content and Entertainment - X Factor Pepsi Digital Preshow and Xtra Factor App
- 2012- Social TV Award for Best TV Show- Specific - X Factor Pepsi Digital Preshow and Xtra Factor App
- 2012- Social TV Award for Best Integration of Twitter - X Factor Pepsi Digital Preshow and Xtra Factor App
- 2012- Social TV Award for Best of Show - X Factor Pepsi Digital Preshow and Xtra Factor App
- 2012- Social TV Award for Best Special Entertainment - GRAMMY Live!
- 2013- Award for Distinguished Service to the Producers Guild of America New Media Council
- 2013- Mobile Excellence Award for Best 2nd Screen Experience for TV on Mobile or Tablet - GRAMMY Live!
- Producers Guild of America Digital VIP Committee Co-Chair (2010,2011,2012)
- The Mobile Excellence Awards Executive Council (2013)
- The Global Advisory Committee for the Earth Day Network Member (2011–present)
- The GATE Leadership Council Member (2009–present)
- Interactive Media Emmys Blue Ribbon Panel Judge (2012)
- The Streamy Awards Blue Ribbon Panel Judge (2012)
