= Rensselaer Technology Park =

Technology park in North Greenbush, NY

Coordinates: 42.67868°N 73.69659°W

The Rensselaer Technology Park is a technology park in North Greenbush, New York, USA (though with a mailing address in Troy) operated by Rensselaer Polytechnic Institute. As of 2009 the park has over 70 tenants representing a diverse range of technologies and employing over 2,400. The park is located along the Hudson River approximately five miles south of the RPI campus.

== History ==
In 1979 a special task force was assembled by RPI President George M. Low composed of faculty, staff, alumni/trustees, and students to study feasibility of developing a park. In March 1981 The Board of Trustees authorized a $3 million investment of the endowment to design and build the infrastructure for the first phase of the Park. Between 1981 and 1982 infrastructure was planned and developed over around 150 acres (0.61 km^{2}), including the construction of 0.8-mile (1.3 km) of roadway and underground utilities including power, gas, water, sanitary and storm sewers and telephone. The first tenant was announced in March 1983, an optoelectronics facility for National Semiconductor. 1983–1991 saw the development of over 100 more acres, and the introduction of several more large companies. In July 1992 MetLife opened a 212,000 sq ft (19,700 m^{2}) computer center that serves as the corporation's national disaster recovery site and computer software development headquarters. MapInfo moved to the park in 1993. MapInfo was founded by three RPI students after taking a course in Technological Entrepreneurship during which they produced their first business plan.

== Other park locations ==
=== DeFreest Homestead ===
The DeFreest Homestead is historic house and barn which was built around 1765 and located near the entrance of the park. The house and surrounding homestead were listed on The National Register of Historic Places in 1977.

=== Children's Museum of Science and Technology ===
The Children's Museum of Science and Technology (CMOST) is the only science center in the Tech Valley designed specifically for kids and parents to Explore, Discover, and Imagine the world of science together. It features a digital dome planetarium, which shows digital educational movies including Molecularium a nanotechnology show developed at RPI.

=== Computational Center for Nanotechnology Innovations ===
The Computational Center for Nanotechnology Innovations (CCNI) is the result of a $100 Million collaboration between RPI, IBM, and New York State to further nanotechnology innovations. When it opened in 2007 it was the 7th most powerful supercomputing centers in the world, and remains in the top 25.
