= Amp (TV series) =

1996–2001 American music TV series

- Created by: Todd Mueller; Burle Avant
- Opening theme: "Tempest" by Deepsky
- Country of origin: United States

Production
- Executive producers: Todd Mueller; Gregg Drebin; Christina Norman; Abby Terkuhle
- Producers: Todd Mueller; V. Owen Bush; Colin Barton
- Editor: Burle Avant
- Running time: 60 minutes (with commercials)

Original release
- Network: MTV
- Release: September 6, 1996 – 2001

Amp is a music video program on MTV that aired from 1996 to 2001. It was aimed at the electronic music and rave crowd and was responsible for exposing many electronica acts to the mainstream. When co-creator Todd Mueller (who had worked on this with V. Owen Bush, Amy Finnerty and show co-creator, on air music video DJ Burle Avant 1996–1997) left the show in 1998, it was redubbed Amp 2.0. The show aired some 46 episodes in total over its 6-year run. In its final two years, reruns were usually shown from earlier years. Amp's time slot was moved around quite a bit, but the show usually aired late at night or in the early morning hours on the weekend. Because of this late night time slot, the show developed a small but cult like following. A few online groups formed after the show's demise to ask MTV to bring the show back and air it during normal hours, but MTV never responded to the requests.

Most of the video clips were created specifically for Amp.

== Compilations ==
The show was popular enough that MTV produced two compilations of songs by artists featured on Amp. MTV's Amp was released in 1997 and MTV's Amp 2 came out a year later in 1998. Both albums were released by Astralwerks/Caroline Records.

== Artists commonly featured on the show ==
- 1.8.7
- Aphex Twin
- Astral Projection
- Atari Teenage Riot
- Autechre
- Aux 88
- Banco de Gaia
- Chemical Brothers
- Coldcut
- Crystal Method
- Daft Punk
- Dr. Octagon
- Emergency Broadcast Network
- Faithless
- Fluke
- The Future Sound of London
- Goldie
- GusGus
- Ken Ishii
- Kraftwerk
- Josh Wink
- Juno Reactor
- Moby
- Orbital
- The Orb
- The Prodigy
- Roni Size
- Speedy J
- Tipsy
- Tranquility Bass
- Tricky
- Underworld
