= SonicVision =

Digitally animated planetarium music show

SonicVision is a digitally animated planetarium music show featuring 38 minutes of music from 17 different musical artists. The content of the animation includes visions of astronomy and space travel as well as abstractions, mandalic imagery, and visual puns. It is a descendant of the laser light shows popular at planetariums in the 1980s and 1990s. As a fully digitally animated music show in a planetarium half-sphere video format, SonicVision is likely the first of its kind anywhere in the world.

In association with MTV2, several VJs and many animators worked to create the visual content for the 7-projector digital projection system at the Hayden Planetarium in New York's American Museum of Natural History. Software used to animate SonicVision included Maya, SoftImage, FilmBox, Adobe After Effects, and Shake. Sponsorship from Sun Microsystems included the donation of much of the computing power necessary to render the animation.

The creative director of SonicVision was Chris Harvey, who drew on cosmic, mystical, and mandalic imagery as well as visions of alien civilizations and distant worlds to bring the half-sphere format to life. Other contributing artists and animators include Benton C Bainbridge, Madame Chao, V. Owen Bush (also Lead Compositor of SonicVision), Mark Bajuk, Carter Emmart, Ed Manning, Bruce Gionet, Matt Pursley, Joshua Minges, Andrew Harper, Doug Vitarelli, and Erik Wesselak. Curious Pictures, Bionic Dots, and Atmospherex also created animations for the project. Imagery from Alex Grey's painting "Collective Vision" appears in one scene.

Although no longer playing at the American Museum of Natural History, SonicVision shows at the Reading Public Museum in Reading, Pennsylvania. On June 2, 2011 it started showing in the Tel Aviv Planetarium in the Eretz Israel Museum produced by Jonathan and Itamar Riftin.

== Songs ==
Songs from SonicVision and the artist or band credited for each:

- "Everything in Its Right Place" – Radiohead
- "Cochise” – Audioslave
- "Elevation” – U2
- "Into the Blue (Spiritual Mix)” – Moby
- "Metronomic Underground" – Stereolab
- "Blood, Milk & Sky” – White Zombie
- "Utopia" – Goldfrapp
- "Ladies & Gentleman We Are Floating in Space" – Spiritualized
- "Mea Culpa" – Brian Eno & David Byrne
- "Heroes" – David Bowie
- "Clocks" – Coldplay
- "Emerge" – Fischerspooner
- "Firestarter" – The Prodigy
- "First It Giveth" – Queens of the Stone Age
- "Julie and Candy" – Boards of Canada
- "We Are All Made of Stars" – Moby
- "Do You Realize??" – The Flaming Lips
- "Honestly" – Zwan
- "God Moving Over the Face of the Waters" – Moby

Moby is also credited with mixing the soundtrack.
