= Incubus HQ Live =

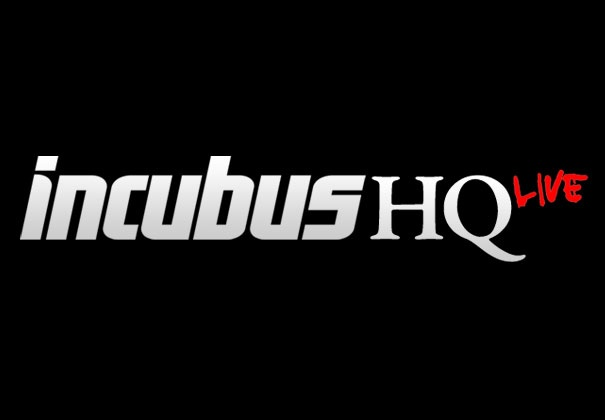
- Directed by: Marc Scarpa
- Produced by: Marc Scarpa; Steve Rennie
- Starring: Brandon Boyd; Mike Einziger; Ben Kenney; Jose Pasillas; DJ Kilmore
- Distributed by: Sony Music Entertainment
- Release date: July 2012
- Running time: 130 minutes
- Country: United States
- Language: English

Incubus HQ Live is a participatory media exhibit and real-time documentary by American rock band Incubus in collaboration with Sony Music Entertainment and producer/director Marc Scarpa. Held in the summer of 2011, it allowed fan access and interaction with the band as they prepared for the release of their seventh studio album, If Not Now, When?. From June 30 to July 6 in a warehouse space in West Los Angeles, California, band members Brandon Boyd, Mike Einziger, Jose Pasillas, Ben Kenney and DJ Kilmore and their fans participated in instrument clinics, question and answer sessions, video chats and large art canvases where both band members and fans alike were encouraged to share original artwork. Each night, Incubus performed a fan created set-list, starting with their earliest material and culminating on the last night with a performance of If Not Now, When? in its entirety.

Events throughout the day and the nightly performances were streamed over the web from multiple points of view (professional and fan-held cameras alike) while participants from around the world shared in the experience through Twitter, Facebook, Livestream, TweetBeam and YouTube. The broadcast was viewed by nearly 2 million people over the course of the week.

The multi-platform, real-time approach to the documentary format allowed Incubus and their fans to reflect on what the music had come to mean to them over time, its significance for them in the moment and its potential and possibility for the future.

A special box set containing performances, interviews with the band members, archival footage and candid footage from over the course of Incubus HQ Live was released in July 2012.
