= OXI (disambiguation) =

OXI, or Ohi Day, is a holiday in Greece on 28 October.

OXI or Oxi may also refer to:

- Cocaine paste, a crude extract of the coca leaf
- Karakoçan, a town of Elazığ Province in the Eastern Anatolia region of Turkey
- Starke County Airport, the FAA LID code OXI
- Roxicodone, a trade name for opioid oxycodone

== See also ==
- Oxy (disambiguation)
