= DeFreest Homestead =

Historic house in New York, United States

- Defreest Homestead
- U.S. National Register of Historic Places
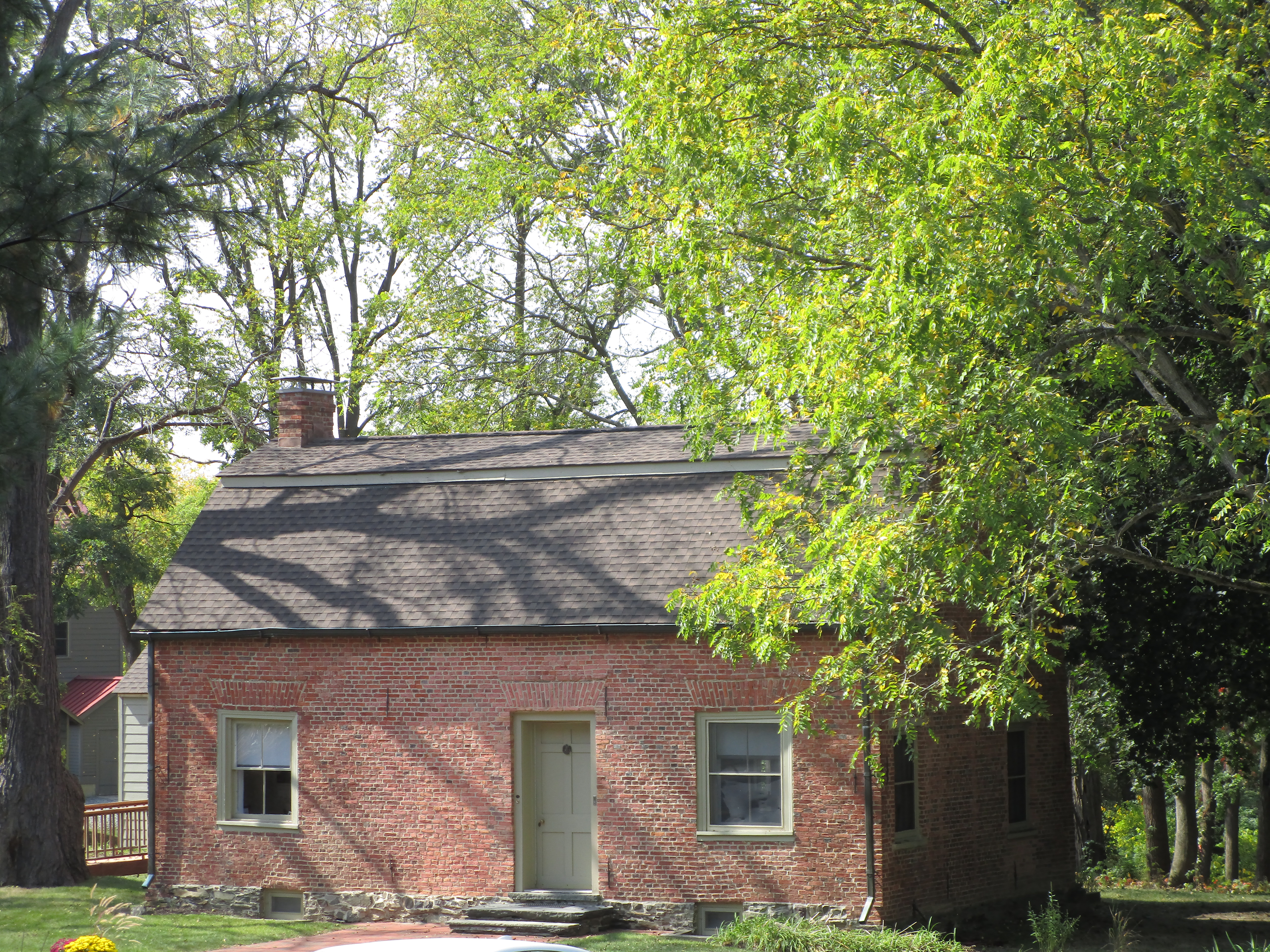

- Location within New York Location within the United States
- Location: RPI Tech Park, U.S. 4 and Jordan Rd., Troy, New York, USA
- Coordinates: 42°40′32″N 73°41′39″W
- Area: 22 acres (8.9 ha)
- Built: c. 1765
- NRHP reference No.: 77000978
- Added to NRHP: August 2, 1977

The DeFreest Homestead is a historic house and barn located in the Rensselaer Technology Park in North Greenbush, New York, United States. The homestead and surrounding land are owned and managed by Rensselaer Polytechnic Institute. It was the original home of Philip DeFreest, one of the first Dutch settlers to arrive in the mid-18th century. The land includes historic buildings typical of a working Dutch farm: a farmhouse restored in 1984 to house the park's administrative offices, and a Dutch barn.

The DeFreest House was built around 1765, partially constructed of European brick used as ballast in Dutch fur trading ships that sailed up the Hudson. Between 1630 and 1850, Dutch barns dominated the landscape in the Hudson Valley. They were distinguished by their H-shaped structural frame. The DeFreest barn was constructed around 1820 of thick, 50-foot beams of hemlock more than a hundred years old when hewn, and wood re-used from earlier structures on the site. The house and surrounding homestead were listed on the National Register of Historic Places in 1977.

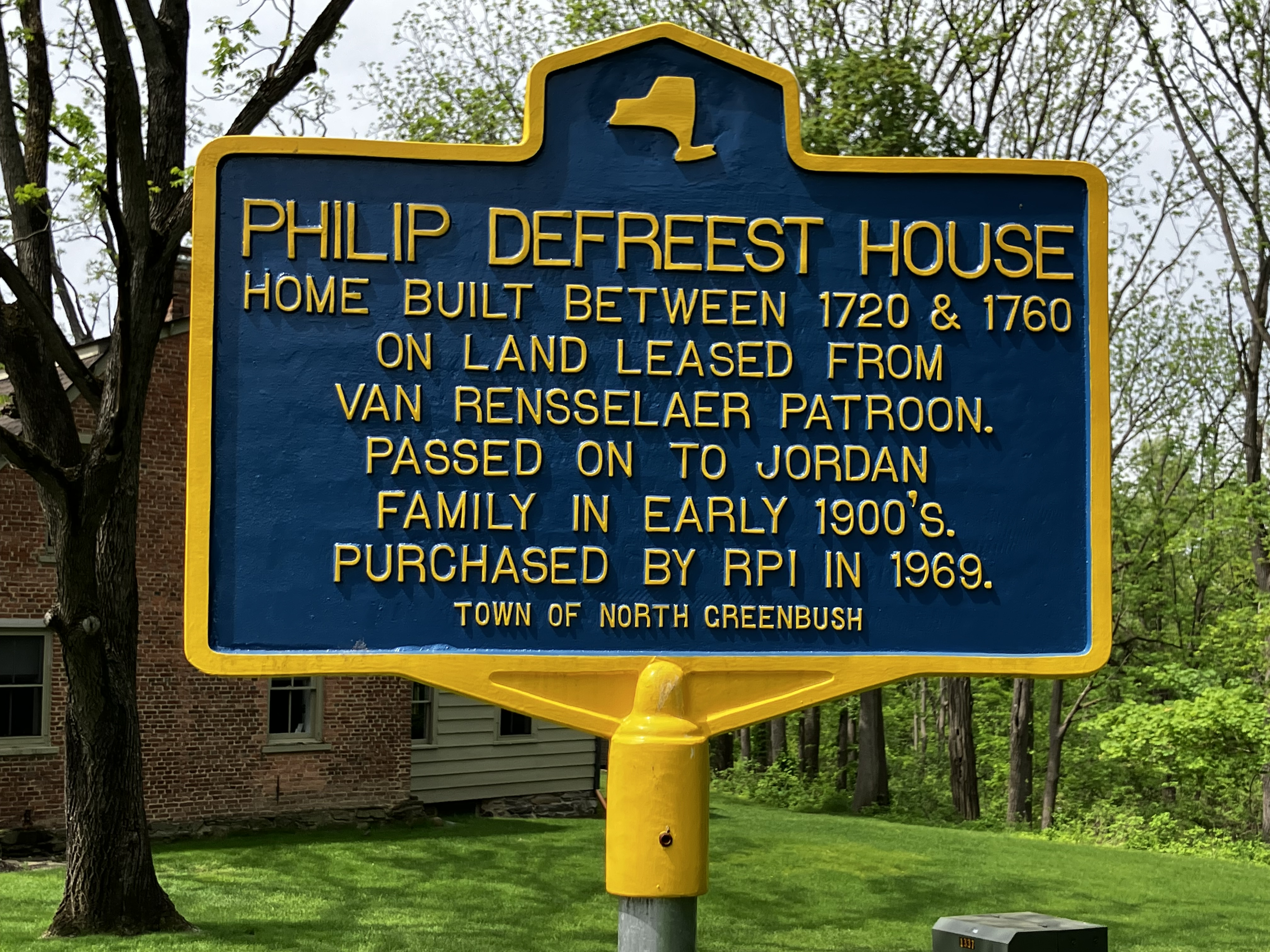
Historical Marker noting the Philip DeFreest house

The DeFreest Homestead has been the interest of honorary trustee C. Sheldon Roberts (RPI class of 1948), and wife, Patricia. Roberts was one of the founders of Fairchild Semiconductor.

A donation from the Roberts family allowed for a renovation to make the historic barn into a modern classroom for local schoolchildren.

Patricia Roberts recalls, “I can remember first seeing the DeFreest House at the end of a muddy path and realizing that it must be saved in order to preserve our past but also, as importantly, to become the centerpiece of the Technology Park. We also recognized that the nearby Dutch barn could serve a similar purpose by preserving some of its history and giving it a new purpose — to become a launch pad for our children’s future.”
