= MTV's Amp =

Compilation album by Various artists
- Released: May 6, 1997
- Genre: Techno; drum and bass; house; industrial
- Length: 60:03
- Label: Astralwerks

Various artists chronology
| MTV's Amp (1997) | MTV's Amp 2 (1998) |

Professional ratings
Review scores
| Source | Rating |
|---|---|
| AllMusic | 4.5/5 stars |
| Robert Christgau | A− |

MTV's Amp is a 1997 electronic album produced by the late-night show, MTV's Amp. It features tracks from electronica artists such as Chemical Brothers, Crystal Method, Goldie, Aphex Twin, and Underworld.

== Track listing ==
1. "Block Rockin' Beats" by The Chemical Brothers - 5:00
2. "Atom Bomb" by Fluke - 3:57
3. "Pearl's Girl" by Underworld - 4:25
4. "We Have Explosive" by The Future Sound of London - 6:22
5. "Ni Ten Ichi Ryu" by Photek - 5:58
6. "Girl/Boy Song" by Aphex Twin - 4:48
7. "The Box" by Orbital - 4:15
8. "We All Want To Be Free" by Tranquility Bass - 4:20
9. "Inner City Life" by Goldie - 3:14
10. "Voodoo People (Chemical Brothers remix)" by The Prodigy - 5:54
11. "Are You There?" by Josh Wink - 3:58
12. "Busy Child" by The Crystal Method - 4:07
13. "Sick To Death" by Atari Teenage Riot - 3:39
