= V. Owen Bush =

Canadian filmmaker

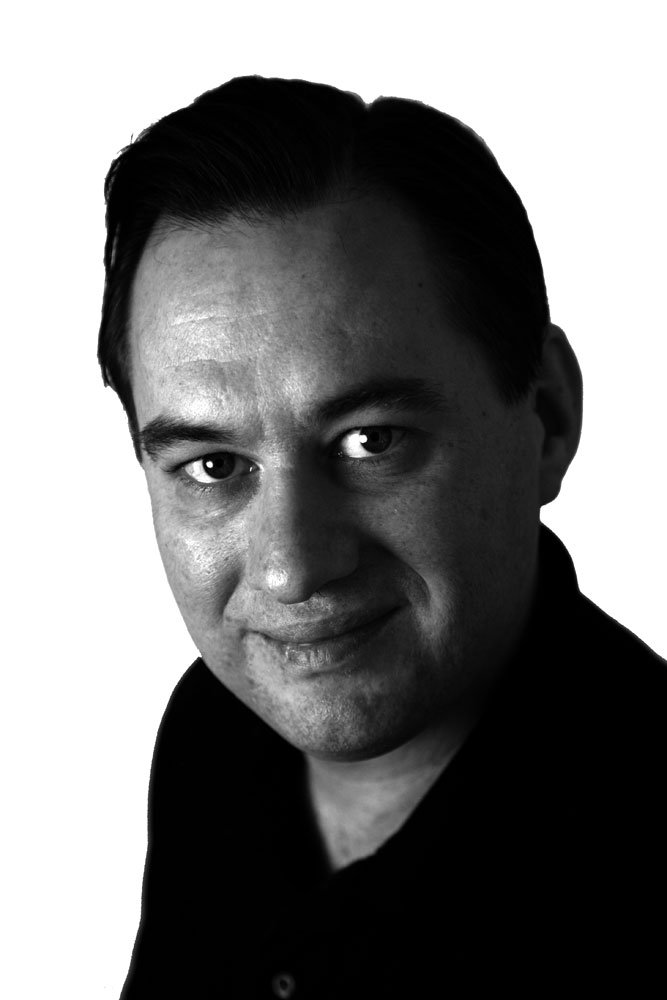
- V. Owen Bush, January 2013
- Born: Vishwanath Owen Bush; Abercorn, Quebec, Canada
- Education: New York University
- Occupations: Director, producer, writer, editor, composite artist, experience designer, VJ, entrepreneur
- Years active: 1994-present
- Website: www.glowingpictures.com

V. Owen Bush is a Canadian designer, producer, and filmmaker who uses immersion and participation to create transformative social experiences. His works have been seen worldwide in venues such as digital planetariums, live concerts and events, IMAX 3D, broadcast television, mobile devices, and the web.

== Early life and education ==
Bush was born in Quebec, Canada. He was named "Vishwanath" upon his birth by Neem Karoli Baba, a renowned Hindu saint. Bush spent his young childhood with his parents in the communal home of David McClelland in Cambridge, Massachusetts where he met intellectuals including Octavio Paz, Chögyam Trungpa, Allen Ginsberg and Buckminster Fuller. Bush's three godparents are Daniel Goleman, Larry Brilliant and Ram Dass.

Bush attended high school at Concord Academy. In 1995 he graduated from New York University's Tisch School of the Arts with a degree in Film and Television.

== Projects ==
=== Pseudo ===
As a producer at the innovative Pseudo.com, Bush created some of the first webcasts and viral videos of the early web in 1995 and 1996. Described in The New York Times as "the Warhol Factory of 1995", Pseudo established itself as the creative icon of New York's Silicon Alley with a series of live events and social experiments that either Bush produced or collaborated on. Bush and his work at Pseudo is extensively profiled in "Totally Wired: on the Trail of the Great Dotcom Swindle". Simon & Schuster. ISBN 978-1-84737-449-3. Significant collaborations at Pseudo included the Merce Cunningham Dance Company, Rev Billy, Josh Harris, EBN, Marc Scarpa, DJ Spooky, and many others.

=== MTV's Amp ===
In 1996 Bush left Pseudo to help launch Amp on MTV, a weekly broadcast TV series of electronic music videos with millions of international viewers. Amp introduced much of the US and global audiences to electronic music and VJ culture, it was described by The New York Times as "a kaleidoscope of computer animation, experimental photography and minimalism that looks more like the offerings of an underground film festival than those of a music network. Like the handiwork of a club disk jockey, many of the videos -- some as long as 12 minutes -- are blended together, fading into one another on similar images or sounds". As Amp's associate producer, Bush created much of its programming and packaging.

=== Art events ===
From 1994-2000, Bush was a principal player in the Omnisensorialist and Immersionist art movements which bridged the NY art boom of the 1980s to the dot-com boom of the 1990s. Bush participated in, designed and produced many multi-sensorial pop-up events largely in Williamsburg, Brooklyn and downtown Manhattan, often in collaboration with ambient or illbient musicians and DJs. Throughout this period Bush collaborated with hundreds of artists and entertainers in groups such as Vapor Action, Floating Point Unit, Soundlab, Ongolia, Ovni, Fakeshop, Unity Gain, and Artificial TV.

=== Visual Performance ===
Bush was an early innovator of the "VJ" medium, starting out with live camera, VHS tape and low resolution digital video. Over the years he has innovated and developed the medium, collaborating with the software design company Vidvox LLC, to develop visual performance tools. As a live video artist and VJ, Bush has toured with musicians, DJs and performing artists across the US, Mexico, Puerto Rico, Norway, England, Italy, France, Greece, Portugal, Germany, Croatia and Switzerland. He has performed at festivals such as Ultra Miami, EDC NY, Sun City Music Festival, Digital Dreams, Dreamhack and many others. Artists he has performed with include: Animal Collective, Dan Deacon, Dirty Projectors, Flying Lotus, Four Tet, Grace Jones, Grandmaster Flash and the Furious Five, JG Thirlwell, Tiesto, Q-Tip, James Blake, Questlove, Adam Beyer, Chris Liebing, Krewella, Carnage, Anamanaguchi, Kanye West, Laidback Luke, LL Cool J, Moby, Paul Oakenfold and many others.

=== Quiet! ===
In 1999, Bush was a lead producer of Josh Harris' Quiet! event, where over 100 people lived, ate, and slept together under constant video surveillance for one month before the event was shut down by the New York City Police Department, New York City Fire Department and Federal Emergency Management Agency on New Year's Day 2000. Bush and Gabrielle Latessa produced "Full", the dining experience which provided banquet breakfasts, lunches and dinners at no cost, to the temporary society of "podwellian dwellers" who were 24-hour residents of the Quiet! capsule hotel. Bush and his work on the Quiet! event are documented in the film, "We Live in Public", the winner of 2009 Sundance grand jury prize for best documentary.

=== Broadcast design ===
Since 1997, Bush has developed broadcast television promos for NBC, MTV, VH1, PBS, Nickelodeon, Discovery, NY1, Showtime, History and others as a freelance broadcast designer.

In 2001, Bush helped create the curriculum for the world's first master's degree in broadcast design as an adjunct professor at Parsons School of Design.

=== Journey into Buddhism ===
From 2000–2006, Bush was associate producer and associate editor of Journey into Buddhism, a 4.5 hour series set in Southeast Asia and Tibet, directed by his father John Bush. Among the museums who have presented the documentary trilogy are the Boston Museum of Fine Arts, the National Gallery of Australia, the Asian Civilisations Museum, the Rubin Museum of Art, the Seattle Art Museum, and the Asia Society in New York. In 2011, Journey Into Buddhism was broadcast across the USA on over 150 PBS stations, presented by WGBH Boston and American Public Television. The trilogy is distributed by PBS for home video The third film, Vajra Sky Over Tibet, was endorsed by the Dalai Lama, called “an illuminating meditation” by Variety, “astonishingly lovely” by the Boston Globe and “best documentary of the year” by Film Threat.

=== SonicVision ===
In 2003, Bush was the editor and composite artist of SonicVision, the full-dome visual music show developed for New York's Hayden Planetarium with a soundtrack mixed by Moby. Reviewed in The New York Times as "shorter than a concert but far longer than a thrill ride... it's a half-hour devoted to rapture, as both a sensory overload and a spiritual ideal". For over eight years, SonicVision was a cultural staple and tourist attraction in New York and many other cities around the world.

=== Molecularium Project ===
Since 2003, Bush has directed the Molecularium Project, realizing the vision of 3 executive scientists at Rensselaer Polytechnic Institute. He is the co-writer and director of "Molecularium - Riding Snowflakes", a fulldome digital planetarium show funded by the National Science Foundation. "Molecularium - Riding Snowflakes" reinvents the dome venue, using character-based animation to take audiences into the nano-scale world of atoms and molecules. In September 2009, "Molecules to the MAX! 3D" opened for IMAX3D, IMAX Dome, and Giant-Screen film theaters. Bush is the director and co-writer of this animated large-format feature, and the president of its production company, Nanotoon Entertainment. Bush managed a team of over 150 skilled professionals, scientists, engineers and students in an unprecedented collaboration between creatives and educators. "Molecules" presents accurate molecular simulations in an immersive ultra high-definition format. "Molecules" and "Molecularium" have been versioned in seven languages and are in growing distribution to theaters, planetariums and museums worldwide. Bush is the co-producer, co-writer and director of "Nanospace" a virtual theme park of atoms and molecules, that launched in 2012 as an online hub for the Molecularium Project. Nanospace ignites learning in young minds through video-games, interactive activities, and short movies.

=== Ram Dass - Love Serve Remember ===
In 2010 Bush produced, directed and edited Ram Dass - Love Serve Remember. The short film is a 40th anniversary companion piece to Ram Dass' spiritual classic Be Here Now. The film examines ego, awareness, truth and love as Ram Dass revisits his personal voyage of transformation. The film is distributed by HarperCollins Publishers in a trans-media strategy for the iPad and iPhone.

=== Glowing Pictures ===
In 2004, Bush co-founded Glowing Pictures with Benton C Bainbridge. Glowing Pictures' work includes televised concerts, music videos, commercials, multimedia operas, and immersive visual environments. Glowing Pictures' is a Visual Experience company that collaborates with cultural institutions, performing artists and brands to create Immersive Wonder. Their work includes televised concerts, music videos, commercials, immersive experiences, brand activations and visual performances. Glowing Pictures' clients include Google, Twitter, MySpace, MTV, Vh1, Gawker, WIRED, American Museum of Natural History, New York Hall of Science, Tao Group, The Creators Project, Eyebeam Art and Technology Center, Dubspot, Beastie Boys, TV on the Radio, Canon, Flavorpill, AM Only, Paramount Pictures, YoungArts, Beatport, The New Museum, The New York Hall of Science The Cooper Hewitt Museum, and many others. Glowing Pictures has executed two large scale visual spectacles in Xi'an, China, and a two-hour epic audiovisual performance at Paramount Pictures. Glowing Pictures created the visual and projections design for Kaki King's "The Neck is a Bridge to the Body" tour which features a Projection Mapped guitar. Glowing Pictures contributed to the creative campaign for Google's Bay Area Challenge, projection mapping over 30 buildings and surfaces all over the Bay Area over 3 nights. Glowing Pictures' "The Future Starts Now" is an original 12 minute audiovisual immersive experience commissioned by Hartford CT's Mandell JCC to celebrate their 100th anniversary. Glowing Pictures created and teaches the Dubspot Visual Performance Program - a course in live audiovisual performance at New York City. Glowing Pictures are the resident visual designers of "One Step Beyond", a monthly live event at the American Museum of Natural History's Rose Center for Earth and Space that is in its tenth year of largely sold-out shows.

=== daydream.io & SpaceoutVR ===
Bush co-founded daydream.io in 2015. It began as a music-powered mobile VR app that generated immersive visuals from your phone music library. In May 2016 daydream.io changed its name to SpaceoutVR after Google paid the company $850,000 for the trademarked intellectual property. Google later released its own virtual reality platform called Daydream. The spaceoutVR app offered 360 video, music, games, and a "social space colony" that generated personified spaces based on deep learning analysis of your social graph. In April 2018 the company was acquired by ValueSetters Inc., a Boston public company.

=== Hudson Virtual Tours ===
In January 2018 Bush co-founded Hudson Virtual Tours with Chase Pierson, a company focused on 3D Mapping of properties and spaces. HVT has captured over 1,000 buildings for hundreds of customers. HVT focuses on historic and cultural 3D Tours of Upstate New York with examples such as the Rensselaer Model Railroad Society, The Cathedral of All Saints, The Van Ostrande-Radliff House in Albany. [8]

=== Scan2Plan® ===
In April 2020 Pierson & Bush co-founded Scan2Plan based upon measurement and modeling projects they were doing in the AEC industry. Scan2Plan is a rapidly growing "existing conditions" service based in Troy, NY & Saugerties, NY. Scan2Plan uses LiDAR, UAV and GIS technologies to create architectural digital twins with extreme accuracy.
