= Oxy =

Oxy or OXY may refer to:

== Arts, entertainment, and media ==
- "Oxy" (song), by Future and Juice Wrld from the 2018 mixtape Wrld on Drugs
- Oxy, a fictional character from the Molecularium Project
- Oxy, abbreviation for the Oxyrhynchus Papyri

== Brands and enterprises ==
- Oxy, a line of skin care products from Mentholatum
- OXY, Ticker symbol and nickname for Occidental Petroleum
- Oxy, a brand of cleaning products from Reckitt Benckiser

== Other uses ==
- Oxy or oxo, a ketone functional group
- Oxy, nickname for Occidental College
- Oxy, short for oxy-fuel welding and cutting
- Oxy, slang term for the drug oxycodone
- Oxy, nickname for the USATF Distance Classic
- OXY, the product code for the Game Boy Micro, a reference to its development codename of "Oxygen"

== See also ==
- Oxi, a stimulant drug based on cocaine paste
- Oxycodone (branded as "Oxycontin"), an addictive painkiller whose name is sometimes abbreviated familiarly as "Oxy"
