= Abigail Child =

American filmmaker, poet, and writer

Abigail Child is an American filmmaker, poet, and writer who has been active in experimental writing and media since the 1970s. Child was born in Newark, New Jersey, in 1948. She has completed more than thirty film and video works and installations, and six books. Child identifies as a person of Left political ideology and considers herself a feminist. Child's early film work addressed the interplay between sound and image through reshaping narrative tropes, prefiguring many concerns of contemporary film and media.

== Academics ==
In 1968, Abigail Child graduated from Radcliffe College in Harvard University with a degree in history and literature. She has received a Guggenheim Fellowship in Film. She has taught at several universities, including New York University, Massachusetts College of Art, and Hampshire College. She has been the chair of Film and Animation department at the School of the Museum of Fine Arts, Boston since 2000 and was appointed to a fellowship at the Radcliffe Institute for Advanced Study. In 2009, she was awarded the Rome Prize.

== Career in film, visual media, writing, and poetry ==
Child began making films in the 1970s, producing seven independent documentaries shot on 16mm. From the middle of the 70s she turned to experimental montage and in the 80s her work explores gender and strategies for remaking narrative. Is This What You Were Born For? is a major, seven-part experimental work from this period, completed over nine years, which included the cult classics Mayhem and Covert Action. In the 90s, Child poetically envisioned and interrogated public spaces in such films as B/side (1996), about urban homelessness on the Lower East Side of New York city, and Below the New: A Russian Chronicle (1999), filmed in St. Petersburg.

In the 21st century, Child's film and video has explored history, memory, and cultural experiences—the politics of place and identity. Digital works like Cake + Steak (2004) and The Future Is Behind You (2005) investigate the awkward drama of the everyday, often utilizing found material to examine the past. Mirror World (2006) is a multi-screen installation that incorporates parts of Child's "foreign film" series to explore narrative excess. Key works include Surface Noise (2000), Dark Dark (2001), Where The Girls Are (2002), Cake and Steak (2004), The Future Is Behind You (2004), To and No Fro (2005), and Mirror World (2006). Her feature video documentary On The Downlow (2007)), is an exploration of bisexuality and an intimate look at a little-viewed underground scene.

In 2012, Child completed a feature film, Shape of Error, an imaginary "home movie" based on the diaries of Mary Shelley during her marriage with Percy Shelley.

Child is also the author of six books of poetry (published between 1983 and 2016) and a book of critical writings: This Is Called Moving: A Critical Poetics of Film (2005).

A collection of writings by various authors on Is This What You Were Born For?, including a DVD of the film series, was published in 2011.

Childs has also experimented with collage work and visual art. In 2021, she exhibited a series of collage pieces to The Hoosac Institute.

== Filmography ==
- Acts and Intermissions (2017)
- Salome (2014)
- ELSA merdelamerdelamer (2012)
- Unbound (2012)
- A Shape Of Error (2011) feature film on Mary and Percy Shelley
- The Suburban Trilogy (2011) film and digital
- Riding the Tiger: Letters from Capitalist China (2010-2014)
- Hacking Empire (2010) single screen version of L'Impero Invertito
- If I Can Sing A Song About Ligatures (2009) w/ Nada Gordon, Foreign Film Series
- Surf And Turf (2008-2011) 16mm/digital, The Suburban Trilogy, part 3
- On The Downlow (2007) Digital feature documentary, dir. by Child; ed: Yael Bitton; Camera: Arthur Jafa
- Mirror World (2006) 16mm to digital, w/ Gary Sullivan Foreign Film Series
- To And No Fro (2005) 16mm to digital, w/ Monica de la Torre. Foreign Film Series
- Blonde Fur (2004) Loop from Cake and Steak
- The Party (2004)
- The Future Is Behind You (2004) film/digital, The Suburban Trilogy, Part 2
- Cake and Steak (2003–04) film/digital, The Suburban Trilogy, Part 1
- The Milky Way (2003) Installation version of Dark Dark
- Subtalk (2002) digital, w/ Benton C Bainbridge and Eric Rosenzveig
- Dark Dark (2001) film, How the World Works, Part 2
- Surface Noise (2000) film, How the World Works, Part 1
- Below the New (1999)
- Her Thirteenth Year (screenplay) (1998)
- B/Side (1996)
- Dinkinsville (1994)
- Through The Looking Lass w/ L. Champagne & Songs (1993) interactive video performance
- Songs (1993) interactive video performance w/Benton C Bainbridge, Vicky Funari and Ikue Mori
- 8 Million (1992) video album w/ Ikue Mori)
- Swamp (1990–91) w/ S. Schulman
- Mercy (1989) Is This What You Were Born For? Part 7
- Both (1988) Is This What You Were Born For? Part 3
- Mayhem (1987) Is This What You Were Born For? Part 6
- Perils (1985–86) Is This What You Were Born For? Part 5
- Covert Action (1984) Is This What You Were Born For? Part 4
- Mutiny (1982–83) Is This What You Were Born For? Part 2
- Prefaces (1981) Is This What You Were Born For? Part 1
- Ornamentals (1979)
- Pacific Far East Line (1979)
- Peripeteia II (1978)
- Daylight Test Section (1978)
- Peripeteia I (1977)
- Some Exterior Presence (1977)
- Tar Garden (1975)
- Mother Movie (1973)
- Game (1972) w/Jon Child
- Except The People (1970) w/Jon Child

== Publications ==
- Is this what you were born for? (MetisPresses, 2011)
- This is Called Moving: A Critical Poetics of Film (University of Alabama Press, 2005)
- Counter Clock (Tout Court Editions, Mermaid Tenement Press, 2009)
- Artificial Memory (Belladonna Press, 2001)
- Flesh poems for Sarah Shulman by Abigail Child (Published by ZET Amsterdam - New York 1990)
- Scatter Matrix (Roof Books, 1996)
- Mob (O Books, 1994)
- A Motive for Mayhem (Potes & Poets, 1989)
- Climate Plus (Coincidence Press: Second Season, 1986)
- From Solids (Roof Books, 1983)
