= MTV's Amp 2 =

Compilation album by Various artists
- Released: June 16, 1998
- Genre: Techno; drum and bass; hip hop; house; industrial
- Label: Astralwerks

Series chronology
MTV's Amp (1997)	MTV's Amp 2 (1998)

Professional ratings
Review scores
Source	Rating
AllMusic	4/5 stars

MTV's Amp 2 is an electronica compilation album released by MTV and Astralwerks. It features prominently collaborations and remixes between electronic musicians and rappers.

== Track listing ==
1. "The Rockafeller Skank" by Fatboy Slim
2. "Release Yo' Delf" (Prodigy Mix) by Method Man
3. "Battleflag" by Lo-Fidelity Allstars
4. "Jungle Brother" (Aphrodite Mix) by Jungle Brothers
5. "War" by Chuck D Vs. Ticc-Tacc ft. Ambersunshower
6. "Sexy Boy" (Sex Kino Mix by Beck) by Air
7. "Abandon Ship (Sharks and Mermaids)" by Kool Keith and Hardkiss
8. "Digital" (Radio Edit) by Goldie and KRS-One
9. "Genius" (Luke Vibert Mix) by Pitchshifter
10. "Circles" (Album Edit) by Adam F
11. "Brown Paper Bag" (Ronny Size Full Vocal Remix) by Roni Size/Reprazent
12. "Bang On!" by Propellerheads
13. "Piku Playground" (Live) by The Chemical Brothers (hidden track)
