= Molecularium Project =

The Molecularium Project is an informal science education project of Rensselaer Polytechnic Institute. The project introduces young audiences to the world of atoms and molecules using character driven stories, animations, games and activities, and molecular visualizations. Rensselaer's three principal scientist and educators behind the project are Linda Schadler, Richard W. Siegel, and Shekhar Garde. The Molecularium Project began as an outreach project of Rensselaer's Nanoscale Science and Engineering Center. To realize the productions, the scientists collaborated with Nanotoon Entertainment, led by writer and director V. Owen Bush, and writer/producer Kurt Przybilla. The Molecularium Project is funded by Rensselaer, the National Science Foundation, and New York State.

== Productions ==
=== Pilot show ===
In 2002, Schadler and Garde produced a seven-minute pilot show for the local planetarium called “Molecularium” for the Digistar II Planetarium system. It introduces children to the concepts of atoms and molecules from small molecules like water to larger molecules like polymers.

=== "Molecularium - Riding Snowflakes" ===
In early 2004, Schadler, Garde, and Siegel were awarded a U.S. National Science Foundation grant to make a new Molecularium show exclusively for an immersive dome based video display environment, also known as a fulldome medium. They recruited filmmaker, and experience designer, V. Owen Bush to bring the idea to life. Bush founded the production company Nanotoon Entertainment with writer/producer Kurt Przybilla to realize the new project. Bush and Przybilla proposed an adventure story of personified atoms flying a ship called the Molecularium through nanoscale materials including a snowflake, a penny, a stick of gum and the human body.

In February 2005, the team debuted "Molecularium - Riding Snowflakes" a 23-minute digital planetarium show at the Children's Museum of Science and Technology. In 2005, "Molecularium - Riding Snowflakes" won the Domie award at Domefest, a festival for immersive dome films, in Albuquerque New Mexico. "Molecularium - Riding Snowflakes" has shown at Chabot Space and Science Center in Oakland, California, the Newark Museum Planetarium in Newark, New Jersey, Dubai Children’s City, UAE, and Thinktank, Birmingham, UK, among other digital planetariums. It has been translated and versioned in Arabic, Korean and Turkish. It is Distributed by E&S, Spitz, Sky-Skan, and e-Planetarium.

In 2010, the American Library Association (ALA) selected the Molecularium Kid's Site for inclusion to its Great Websites for Kids.

=== "Molecularium - Molecules to the MAX!" ===
"Molecules to the MAX!" is a 41-minute fully animated 3D IMAX film for the Giant Screen. The film re-imagines the characters and story developed for "Molecularium- Riding Snowflakes" for an older audience and a different medium. The film's simulations and rendering were partially computed at the Computational Center for Nanotechnology Innovations. The film was produced by Nanotoon Entertainment and Developed at Rensselaer, with a gift from Curtis R. Priem, co-founder of Nvidia corporation.

The digital version of the film premiered at EMPAC, in Troy, New York, on February 27, 2009. The IMAX version premiered at the Giant Screen Cinema Association International Conference and Trade Show in Indianapolis, Indiana, on September 22, 2009. The IMAX 3D Premiere was at the GSCA Film Expo in Los Angeles on February 24, 2010. It is available in 2D & 3D for 15/70 and 8/70 large format film and in digital 3D. The film has been composed with Omnimax / IMAX Domes in mind. Molecules to the MAX! was nominated for Best Film Produced for the Giant Screen, Best Film for Lifelong Learning and Best Sound Design at the 2010 GSCA’s Achievement Awards. Molecules to the MAX! has shown at the National Museum of Natural Science (Taichung, Taiwan) Maloka Interactive Museum (Bogota, Colombia), The Scientific Center (Salmiya, Kuwait), McWane Science Center (Birmingham, Alabama) Proctor's Theatre (Schenectady, New York) among others. It has been translated and versioned in Spanish, Chinese, Japanese and Arabic. It is distributed to Giant Screen theaters by SK Films.

=== NanoSpace ===
In the spring of 2012, the Molecularium Project launched NanoSpace, an online molecular theme park. Visitors to NanoSpace learn scientific concepts with games, activities and movies. Areas within Nanospace include the Hall of Atoms and Molecules, H_{2}O park (the water cycle), Sizes in the Universe (scale and scientific notation), Material Boulevard (Materials Science), and DNA Land (Molecular Biology).
