= Linda Schadler =

American materials scientist and academic administrator

- Born: Linda Sue Schadler
- Education: Cornell University (BS); University of Pennsylvania (PhD)
- Scientific career
- Fields: Polymers; Composites
- Workplaces: Rensselaer Polytechnic Institute; Drexel University; IBM; Thomas J. Watson Research Center; University of Vermont
- Thesis: A study of the micromechanics of the fiber-matrix interphase in mono-filament composites, in monotonic loading and cyclic fatigue (1990)
- Website: www.uvm.edu/cems/profiles/linda-s-schadler

Linda Sue Schadler is the Dean of the College of Engineering and Mathematical Sciences, and interim provost and senior vice president at the University of Vermont. Her research investigates the mechanical, optical and electric behaviour of polymer composites. She is a member of the National Academy of Engineering and a Fellow of the Materials Research Society and ASM International.

== Early life and education ==
Schadler grew up in Niskayuna, New York. Her father worked in metallurgy at General Electric and her mother was a biology professor at Union College. Schadler graduated top of her high school class. She studied materials science at Cornell University and graduated in 1985. She moved to the University of Pennsylvania for her doctoral research, working on the micromechanical behavior of fiber / polymer composites.

== Research and career ==
After her PhD, Schadler was a postdoctoral researcher at the Thomas J. Watson Research Center. Schadler was appointed to the faculty at Drexel University in 1992. She moved to Rensselaer Polytechnic Institute in 1996, where she served on the faculty for twenty two years. In 2012 she was made Russell Sage Professor. Her research at the Rensselaer Polytechnic Institute included studies into polymer composites and other two-phase systems. She eventually became Vice Provost and Dean of Undergraduate Education. Schadler created a video called Molecules to the Max, which introduces the general public to materials science. She created the beta classroom, an experimental space for novel teaching, as well as a seed fund for pedagogical innovation.

In 2018 Schadler moved to the University of Vermont, where she was made Dean of Engineering and Mathematical Sciences. She was awarded a $5 million grant to create a database of polymer nanocomposites and metamaterials that will permit researchers to predict the properties of new materials. At Vermont Schadler looks to ensure scientists and engineers receive training in the humanities. In October 2024, Schadler became the acting provost and senior vice president of UVM, following Patricia Prelock's appointment as interim president of UVM.

== Awards and honours ==
- 1994 National Science Foundation National Young Investigator
- 1997 ASM International Bradley Staughton Award
- 1998 ASM International Fellow
- 2011 Elected trustee of the ASM International
- 2016 Elected a fellow of the Materials Research Society
- 2019 Appointed to the MRS Board of Directors
- 2025 Elected to the National Academy of Engineering

== Selected publications ==
- Schadler, Linda (1998). "Load transfer in carbon nanotube epoxy composites". Applied Physics Letters. 73 (26): 3842–3844. Bibcode:1998ApPhL..73.3842S. doi:10.1063/1.122911.
- Schadler, Linda (2000). "Single-walled carbon nanotube–polymer composites: strength and weakness". Advanced Materials. 12 (10): 750–753. doi:10.1002/(SICI)1521-4095(200005)12:10<750::AID-ADMA750>3.0.CO;2-6.
- Schadler, Linda (2005). "Quantitative equivalence between polymer nanocomposites and thin polymer films". Nature Materials. 4 (9): 693–698. Bibcode:2005NatMa...4..693B. doi:10.1038/nmat1447. PMID 16086021. S2CID 1102379.
- Islam, M. R.; Tudryn, G.; Bucinell, R.; Schadler, L.; Picu, R. C. (2017). "Morphology and mechanics of fungal mycelium". Scientific Reports. 7 (1): 13070. Bibcode:2017NatSR...713070I. doi:10.1038/s41598-017-13295-2. ISSN 2045-2322. PMC 5638950. PMID 29026133.

== Personal life ==
Schadler is married to Tom Feist, with whom she has two children.
