= Jeffrey Wisenbaugh =

American comedian and blogger

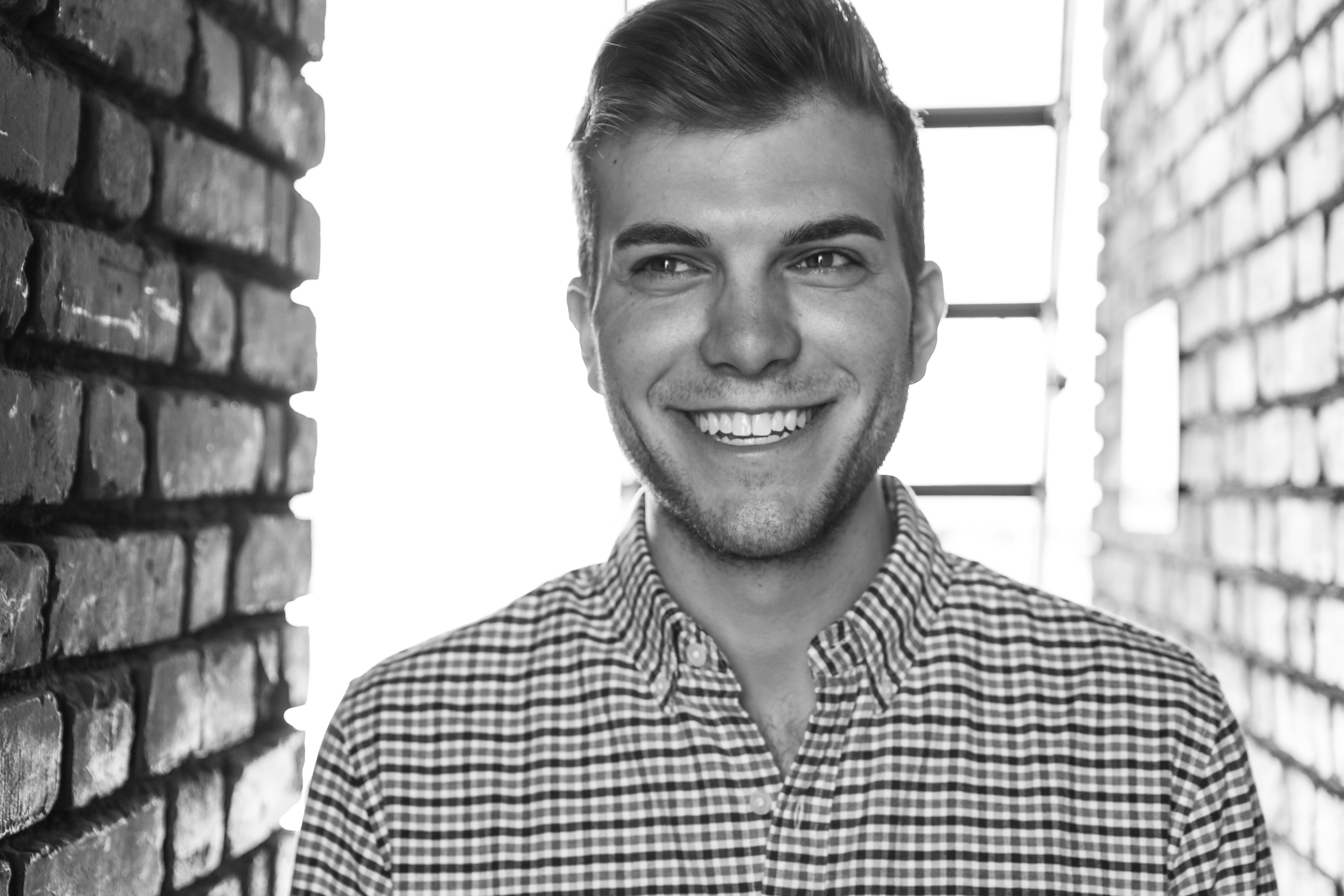
- Born: Swartz Creek, Michigan, U.S.
- Education: Michigan State University
- Years active: 2007–present
- Known for: YouTube, content creation

Jeffrey Wisenbaugh is an American digital content executive, producer and former TV/internet personality. He currently serves as Head of Content at Instagram.

== Early life and education ==
Wisenbaugh was born and raised in Swartz Creek, Michigan. He graduated from Swartz Creek High School where he was active in the band and the theater departments. He graduated from Michigan State University with a bachelor's degree in psychology. While at Michigan State he was a board member of the student group, Telecasters, and was a series cast member on The ShoW, the longest-running college sitcom in the United States.

== Career ==
In 2007, Wisenbaugh created a YouTube channel under the username “KoolJeffrey” and was one of the first YouTube Partners on the platform. His channel featured short sketches, "Day in the Life" videos, Q&A's and more. Wisenbaugh gained over 2 million video views on his videos.

In November 2009, Wisenbaugh started his career as a television personality by hosting segments on MSUToday, a show that shares "stories of impact and inspiration— on campus and around the world." Wisenbaugh hosted segments that covered student life and campus research. His segments aired on Big Ten Network.

In May 2012, Wisenbaugh moved to Los Angeles to start working as a digital reporter/writer for Ryan Seacrest Productions, in which he covered red carpet events like the 2012 MTV VMAs and various movie premieres. In his time with RSP, Wisenbaugh interviewed people such as Ariana Grande, Selena Gomez, Matthew Fox, Tyler Perry, Elizabeth Banks, Anna Kendrick, Cody Simpson and Ryan Beatty.

In May 2013, Wisenbaugh joined NBCUniversal where he worked on E! News and E! Network content. He ultimately led the Originals & Live Programming team for E! News where he supervised the production and creative for all digital on-air content. He helped develop the first-ever Snapchat series "The Rundown", launched E!'s first digital scripted series "Hashtaggers", created the network's first digital originals slate and managed the team that produced all live content.

In March 2017, he joined Group Nine Media in its infancy as Sr. Director, Development and Social Studios. There he led the team responsible for launching new series, developed daily content for Instagram, Facebook and Snapchat and maintained strategic relationships with talent partners and vendors.

In January 2019, Wisenbaugh was hired as Instagram's Head of Content where he oversees the content strategy across the company's own social channels including @Instagram, the world's largest social media account with over 276 million followers.

== Awards and recognition ==
In 2011, Wisenbaugh won an Emmy Award in the performer/narrator category for his work on MSUToday.

== Personal life ==
Wisenbaugh currently lives in San Francisco with his wife, Kelly Wisenbaugh. They were married September 30, 2017. They have one daughter.
