= Benton C Bainbridge =

American media artist (born 1966)

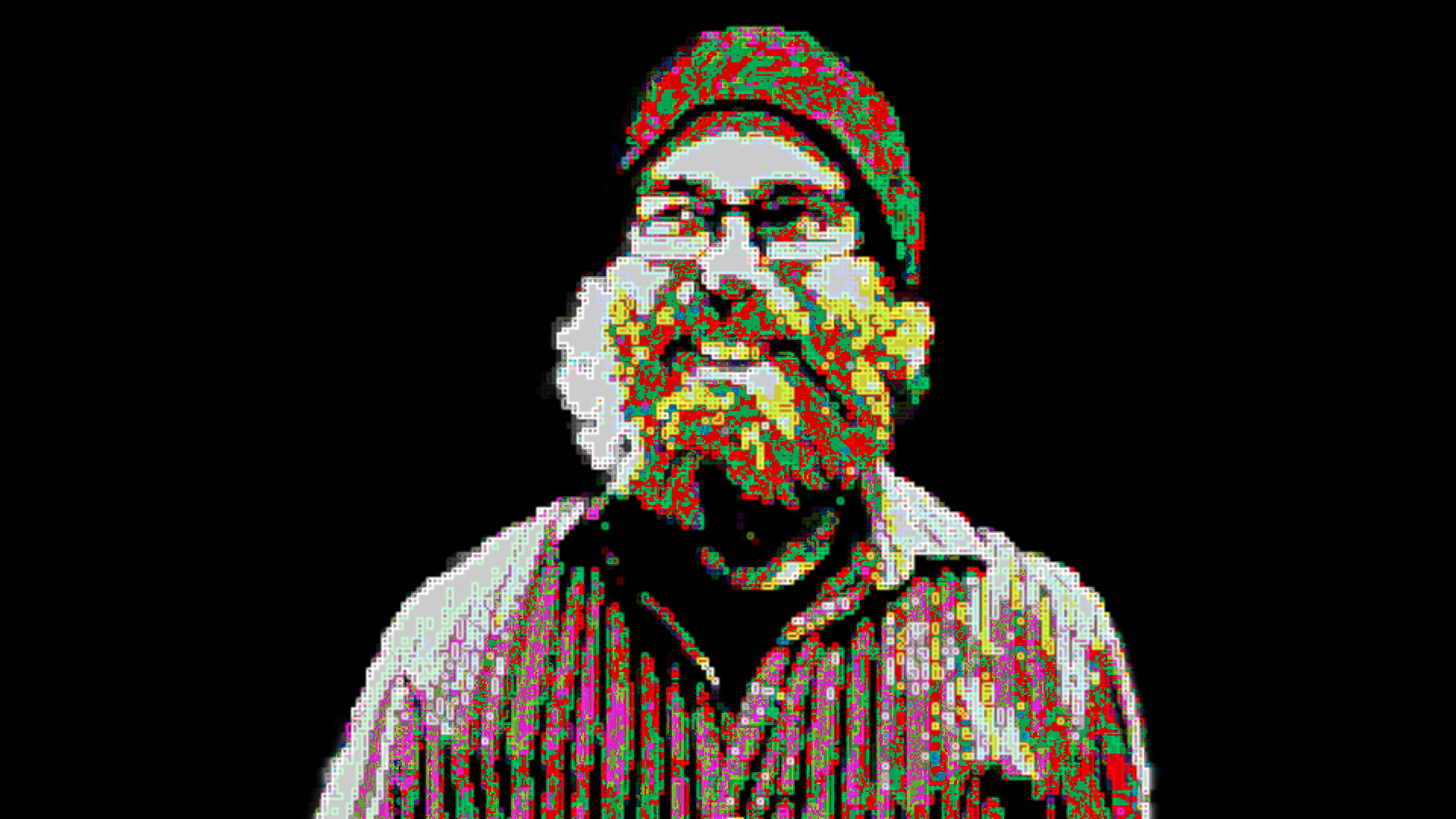
- A frame from a video self-portrait by Benton C Bainbridge, made with his interactive installation
- Born: January 22, 1966 (age 60); Cleveland, Ohio, U.S.
- Education: New York University Tisch School of the Arts
- Known for: Media Artist
- Awards: 2010: Bronx Recognizes Its Own/BRIO, Bronx Council on the Arts Video Artist Honoree; 1999: Bessie Awards, Dance Theater Workshop's New York Dance and Performance Award for Video Design (shared with Caspar Stracke)
- Website: bentoncbainbridge.art

Benton C Bainbridge (born January 22, 1966) is an American artist known for new media art including single channel video, interactive artworks, immersive installations and live visual performances with custom digital, analog and optical systems of his own design.

He is faculty at School of Visual Arts MFA Computer Arts department. His work is collected in the Turbulence.org collection and The "ETC: Experimental Television Center Archives" in the Rose Goldsen Media Archives at Cornell University and The Kitchen Archive at the Getty Research Institute. From 2006 to 2007, Bainbridge was Education Fellow at Eyebeam. He has since realized many projects there, including the inaugural MIXER event and VHS portraits.

His early career focused on the live creation of electronic cinema in collaboration with other artists and anticipated today's VJ collectives. Bainbridge's aesthetic technique is characterized by extensive realtime manipulation analog and digital media. His work is presented in both art and entertainment spaces ranging from museums to stadiums.

He has shown across five continents, collaborating with artists including the Beastie Boys, Kaki King, Pauline Oliveros, V. Owen Bush, Abigail Child, Nick Didkovsky, Bobby Previte, Jin Hi Kim, Dream Theater, Barbara Held, Lonnie Holley and Tonstartssbandht, among many others.

Bainbridge has shown his work in venues such as the Whitney Museum of American Art, Museum of Modern Art, Lincoln Center, Madison Square Garden, The Kitchen (NYC), EMPAC (Troy, NY), the American Museum of Natural History, SFMOMA (San Francisco), Hirshhorn Museum and Sculpture Garden (Washington, D.C.), Dallas Video Festival, Boston Cyberarts Festival, Eyebeam, Mercat des les Flors (Barcelona), LUX2006 (Sevilla), Auditorium Parco della Musica (Roma), Test-Portal (Amsterdam), Sonic Light (Amsterdam), Wien Modern (Vienna), Inventionen (Berlin), Teatro Colón CETC (Buenos Aires), CELCIT (Managua), Xi'an China International Horticultural Exposition 2011, Korean Festival (Seoul), Good Vibrations (Australia), and MTV Networks (global).

Bainbridge has founded and is currently developing FEED Media Art Center at 1307 State Street in Erie, Pennsylvania. Previously the 50,000 sq ft building was owned by Epp Furniture company before being renovated.

== Early life and education ==
Bainbridge was born in Cleveland, Ohio, where his father was an electronics and computer engineer with NASA's Lewis Research Center (now Glenn Research Center) and his mother wrote, photographed and made artwork with paint and fabric. He was first exposed to abstract video art on Public Television through the analog effects of The Electric Company. Later, Bainbridge's family moved to the exurbs of Erie, Pennsylvania where he met and began making drawings, plastic sculptures and food art with Philp R. Bonner. He attended General McLane High School, in Edinboro, PA, where he began collaborating with his fellow artist students, presenting several multimedia performances in the school incorporating Super 8mm film, 35mm slides, 1/2" Reel to reel and VHS video technology, along with performers, costumes, art objects, and music. At this time, Bainbridge also made Comix, performance art, and electronic music, showing at Erie area galleries and art spaces as well as non-art venues like swimming pools and other public spaces.

After high school, Bainbridge moved to New York City and immersed himself in New York's Lower East Side art scene while studying film and TV at New York University's Tisch School of the Arts. As an undergrad, Bainbridge chose video as his primary medium and began presenting work at art spaces and clubs like Space 2B (aka "The Gas Station") and Danceteria. Working at Rafik as an engineer, editor and salesperson introduced him to many artists, personalities, ideas and esthetics. At Rafik, Bainbridge worked on projects for Robin Byrd, Richard Kern and Boogie Down Productions' "The Bridge Is Over" video.

In 1989, Bainbridge graduated from Tisch with a Bachelor in Fine Arts. That same year his short video "Betabet" was screened at Museum of Modern Art in the Film/Video Arts 21 program and he was awarded his first residency at Experimental Television Center. As part of this residency, Bainbridge began his first live video performance experiments with collaborators Philip R. "Bulk Foodveyor" Bonner, Jonathan "Naval Cassidy" Giles, Chad Strohmayer and Andrew Koontz. These early experiments convinced Bainbridge that video art can be made much as music: in real time, in collaboration, in public, via the free manipulation of all the tools of the medium.

== Live visuals for Beastie Boys ==
Bainbridge co-designed multichannel, realtime video for two Beastie Boys' global tours and TV appearances including nearly all of MTV Networks' channels on four continents. For the Beasties' "The Mix Up" tour, Bainbridge's video designs used RGB LED technology to play visuals on Spike Brant's (Performance Environment Design Group) giant video mobile. For Vh1, CMT and other networks, Bainbridge designed and performed video for numerous live televised performances, first VJing for Beastie Boys' 2004 MTV VMA performance and then TV appearances promoting "To the 5 Boroughs".

== Select performances, exhibitions and screenings ==
=== 2017 ===
Title	Place	Description
ONE STEP BEYOND	NYC.	Resident visual artist for American Museum of Natural History's monthly event launch in 2007.

=== 2016 ===
Title	Place	Description
Picturing You	Indonesia	Bandung International Digital Arts Festival 2016
Ghost Komungobot	Indonesia	Bandung International Digital Arts Festival 2016

=== 2015 ===
Title	Place	Description
The Experimental Television Center: A History, Etc. . .	NYC.	Hunter College

=== 2014 ===
Title	Place	Description
DIGITAL BUDDHA	Metropolitan Museum of Art, NYC.	Projection design for Jin Hi Kim's Komungo concert.
PERFORMING MEDIA: WORKS BY SIGNAL CULTURE ARTISTS IN RESIDENCE	Everson Museum, Syracuse, NY.	Picturing You Installation & Oscilloscope Performance.
HORIZON	Eyebeam, NYC.	Laser & Video Design (with Sofy Yuditskaya).
THE NECK IS A BRIDGE TO THE BODY	BRIC, Brooklyn.	Projection/interaction design & visual performance for evening length concert, mapped onto a white guitar. Glowing Pictures with Kaki King.

=== 2013 ===
Title	Place	Description
VHS PORTRAITS	Eyebeam, NYC.	Visual performance and exhibition of 5 dozen on-site video portraits on T-5 tapes.
BALLET MECANIQUE	Vanderbilt University, Nashville.	Interactive remix of Leger's film for Vortex Percussion (with Greg Pond).
MINOR ME	NYC.	"Cubist" music video for diNMachine made with RGBD Toolkit.
Tiësto AT TAO	Tao, NYC.	Projection mapping onto 16-foot (4.9 m) tall statue of Quan Yin for DJ Halloween performance.
BROOKLYN ELECTRONIC MUSIC FESTIVAL	NYC.	Visual designer for multiple venue music festival.

=== 2012 ===
Title	Place	Description
Super Long Play!	Seed Space, Nashville.	Lo-fi interactive installation of 50 original VHS tapes made with Erin Law, Perrin Ireland, Tony Youngblood, Ryan Hogan, Johnny Invective, Ezra Bainbridge-Powers: an electronic sketchbook.
Crystal Garden (all)	BronxArtSpace, NYC.	DVD edition premieres in group show.
Brother Islands	Eyebeam & Longwood Gallery, NYC.	HD video "painting" loop and QR code texts with quotes from Bill Etra: an "expanded documentary" about quarantine islands.
Daytime	Armory Weekend, NYC.	Abstract narrative collaboration with Steve Nalepa & V. Owen Bush.

=== 2011 ===
Title	Place	Description
Canon Cinema EOS	Paramount Sky Wall, Los Angeles.	Live 2-channel video mix by Glowing Pictures of Paramount movies for release of Cinema EOS.
Punto y Raya Festival	Barcelona, Spain.	Screening of "Flood Basalt & the Guillotine".
Infinite Light Limited Edition	Devotion Gallery, Brooklyn.	Blu-ray edition premiere
Surpass	Xi'an, China.	Week-long art, music and video festival at the gates of the Daming Palace.
Xi'an International Horticultural Expo 2011	Xi'an China.	Dance/media art on the Water Stages by Benton C Bainbridge and choreographer Brooke Broussard.
Presidential Scholars	The John F. Kennedy Center for the Performing Arts, Washington D.C.	Cinematic Arts Mentor and Visual Designer.
Youngarts	Baryshnikov Arts Center/Arsht Center for the Performing Arts of Miami-Dade County, NYC/Miami.	Cinematic Arts Mentor and Visual Designer.

=== 2010 ===
Title	Place	Description
Sensilia Tacec	La Plata, Argentina.	Installation and a/v performance by Maguna • Bainbridge, Lucio Capece and Mika Vainio.
Changes in the Bronx	LDR Studio Gallery, Bronx, NY.	Two-person show (with Luis D. Rosado) of videos, installations, interactive objects and prints.
Creators Project	MILK Gallery, NYC.	Interactive Projection Art for MOS Architects "Rainbow Vomit" installation at VICE/Intel arts event.
Schuman Award Concert Honoring Pauline Oliveros	Miller Theater/Columbia University.	Visual design and live video.
Mixer: Olympiad	Eyebeam, NYC.	Visual design (including 19 meter Second Life portal) and live video mix.
Diorama 1: Painting	Panoramica, Buenos Aires.	Maguna • Bainbridge video mix performance with live music and dancers.
Impromptu	Devotion Gallery, NYC.	Art exhibition with Phoenix Perry.

=== 2009 ===
Title	Place	Description
Gabriel Von Wayaditch	Brooklyn Museum.	Director/Visual Designer/VJ for multimedia lecture for Extremely Hungary! at Target First Saturdays.
Galileo Galilei, Tacec	La Plata, Argentina.	Visual co-design with Minou Maguna for John King's adaptation of the Bertolt Brecht play.
Pauline Oliveros/Angie Eng/Benton C Bainbridge	Deep Listening Institute, Kingston, NY.	Music and video improvisation.
The Big Deep	The Kitchen, NYC.	Visual design and performance with Pauline Oliveros, Roscoe Mitchell, Deep Listening Band, DJ Olive.
Supersonic	Birmingham, UK.	"Dialed In" a/v duo performance with Bobby Previte.
Visual Music Marathon	New York.	"Dark Star" screens at SVA.
Mixiology Festival	Roulette, NYC.	"Losperus" with Evidence
Mixer: remix	Eyebeam, NYC.	Live visual remix of artists including Jeffrey Crouse/Aaron Myers and David Jimison.
Remix Hotel	Miami Beach.	VJ with DJ Sneak and Laidback Luke at WMC.
Musica per Roma		"Three Voices" with Joan La Barbara. Video/Stage Co-Design with Minou Maguna.

=== 2008 ===
Title	Place	Description
Mixer: Underground	Eyebeam, NYC.	"Goodbye, NY" 3 channel video installation about Mayor Giuiliani's illegal demolition of an East Village squat, with David Jimison.
Ciclo de conciertos música contemporánea.	Buenos Aires, Argentina.	"Three Voices" by Morton Feldman, performed by Joan La Barbara. Video/Stage Co-Design with Minou Maguna.
Organica	Royce Hall, Los Angeles.	Visual design and performance for Christoph Bull's pipe organ concert. (also 2004)
Take 4	Newark, NJ.	"Stretchknit Wally" in CWoW exhibition/DVD of minute-long videos curated by Liz Slagus & Norene Leddy.
From Point to Departure	New York.	"CODEMODEC" DVD edition exhibit at Issue Project Room.
Remix Hotel	Miami Beach.	VJ with Richie Hawtin and other DJs at WMC.

=== 2007 ===
Title	Place	Description
"Brother Islands: Places to Lose People"	Eyebeam, NYC.	An 'expanded documentary' about NYC's quarantine islands, presented at Eyebeam as immersive media environment with physical performance.
Custom Control	Troy, NY.	"Dialed In", a/v duo with Bobby Previte presented by EMPAC.
Korean Festival	Seoul, Korea.	"Digital Buddha" with Jin Hi Kim.
Dallas Video Festival	Dallas, Texas.	Previte/Bainbridge's "Dance Hall Mécanique" and Nalepa/Last/Bainbridge's "Flatlands" screened. (also 2006, 2002)
Scanner New York Video Festival	New York.	Bobby Previte and Benton C live music/video duo as part of "Circuits Maximus" at Lincoln Center's Walter Reade Theater.
Water Music Remix	Newport, RI	David Last and Benton C live a/v duo improv at Tall Ships outdoor music event presented by Duncan Laurie, Newport Classic and the Museum of Yachting.
"The Mix Up Tour"	Worldwide	David Last and Benton C live a/v duo improv at Tall Ships outdoor music event presented by Duncan Laurie, Newport Classic and the Museum of Yachting.
"Anthology Film Archives"	New York.	Live VJ performance with 99 Hooker and Lance Blisters.
Visual Music Marathon	Boston	"Dark Star" screens as part of Boston CyberArts Festival event at Northeastern University.
Good Vibrations Festival	Melbourne/Sydney.	Live improvised VJing/multicamera system design for Beastie Boys.

=== 2006 ===
Title	Place	Description
LMCC "Swing Space	15 NASSAU, NYC.	Live video and Komungo performance "Digital Buddha" with Jin Hi Kim.
VH1 Hip Hop Honors	NYC/Worldwide.	Design and perform multichannel video for Beastie Boys live performance as honorees.
Points in a circle	New York.	Bobby Previte and Benton C improv a/v sample-trigger performance at Issue Project Room using Stephan Moore's hemispherical speaker grid.
NArt Showcase	Seoul, Korea	Video for Seongah Shin's computer music composition "Sarah 90" premieres at Sojang University's Mary Hall.
Mixology Festival	New York.	"Landscaping" a/v performance, Benton C and Evidence, presented by Roulette at Location One.
LUX2006	Sevilla, Spain.	Duo a/v improv with Once11 for VJ Festival.
Infinito Nero	Buenos Aires, Argentina.	Video Design for Martin Bauer's production of Sciarrino's opera, presented in Minou Maguna's set and performed by VJ_Anibal Kelvo.
Bentfest	New York.	Trio with Dafna Naphtali and Alex Waterman at circuit bending festival on the MoFoPro system.
Brakhage	Dallas	Live remix of Stan Brakhage's films and lectures at Magnolia Lounge presented by Dallas Video Association.
Sun Khronos	New York.	Premiere of "Dark Star" at Millennium Film Archives.
Live Processing	New York.	Visual design and video performance with choreographer Koosil-ja, musician Geoff Matters, and dancer Melissa Guerrero at Lower Manhattan Cultural Council "Swing Space".

=== 2005 ===
Title	Place	Description
Z100 Jingle Ball	New York.	VJ/Visuals design for Madison Square Garden holiday variety show with many artists including Kanye West, Destiny's Child, Sean Paul, Backstreet Boys, Fall Out Boy. [also 2004]
Video in Twilight. Analog of No Return	Karlsruhe.	Screening of VJ/DJ performance excerpt with Venetian Snares. Curated by Woody Vasulka for OASIS/ZKM.
VH1 Hip Hop Honors 2005	USA.	Screens Visuals with FUEVOZ for all the music performances for this TV tribute - rescan, mixing and clip scrubbing with Big Daddy, Kane, Ice-T, LL Cool J and many more Hip Hop legends.
EMPAC 360	Troy, NY.	Live audiovisual performance with 6-channel music and programming by Stephan Moore, dance by Flyaway Productions and pyro by Pierre-Alain Hubert and Grucci.
Visual Music/ Cosmic Drift	Washington D.C.	Live video 'remix' of Stan Brakhage's lectures as member of rev.99 for live event at Smithsonian Institution's Hirshhorn Museum and Sculpture Garden.
TEST-PORTAL 2005	Amsterdam.	Present a program of SYNAESTHESIOLOGISTS and performances with Johnny DeKam, 2/5 BZ and solo.
Videos Experimentales Contemporáneos de Nueva York.	Buenos Aires, Argentina.	Screenings of works by Benton C Bainbridge, NNeng/NNeng-M and Bill Etra at PROA FUNDACION. Coordinadora: Minou Maguna.
Convergence: IFFB/Boston Cyberarts	Boston.	Live video with Walter Wright and United States of Belt (Ross Goldstein) for meeting of International Film Fest of Boston and Boston Cyberarts Fest.
Byron Carlyle Theatre	Miami Beach.	Live video design and performance for "Nervous City Orchestra," by Composer Livio Tragtenberg. Commissioned by Tigertail.
"La Belle Captive"	THE KITCHEN, New York City.	Live video design and performance for an electronic audiovisual opera by John King.

=== 2004 ===
Title	Place	Description
Ciclo de Música Contemporánea.	Buenos Aires, Argentina.	3 channel live video for "El Malogrado", Martin Bauer's musical theater based on Thomas Bernhard's "The Loser", at Teatro San Martin.
VH1 Hip Hop Honors	USA	Visuals Jockey for musical performances on program honoring the pioneers of hip hop. Live image processing, mixing and clip scrubbing with Public Enemy, Grandmaster, Flash and Beastie Boys.
Fronteras Festival	London	Live video for experimental opera "La Belle Captive" at ICA.
SYNAESTHESIOLOGISTS	New York	Co-curated a screening, live a/v performances, installations and a Video Jukebox for The 2004 New York Video Festival with David Last. Also featured at Virginia Film Festival.
"To the 5 Boroughs Tour"	Worldwide venues	TV performances on VH1, MTV, MTV2, MTVJapan, MTVLA, MTV Europe, Steve Harvey Show. Co-design visuals with artfag, llc and live Oscilloscope tweaking and VJ'ing for Beastie Boys. SONIC VISION, San Francisco. "Karma" screens in Kathleen Forde's program at SFMoMA.
Monkeytown Invitational	New York City	Live a/v synthesis on custom hybrid analog/digital system (with V. Owen Bush) for 4 projection walls and gourmet appetizers.
Sickness @ÉLAN	New York City.	VJ with Venetian Snares, C-TRL and others.

=== 2003 ===
Title	Place	Description
Élan	New York City	Realtime 3D & video for "mech[a]" & "OUTPUT" with choreographer/dancer Koosil-ja Hwang and musician Geoff Matters.
New Genre XI	Nightingale Theater, Tulsa.	Live video and music for "Annotations" with dancer/choreographer Helena Thevenot.
SonicVision	American Museum of Natural History, New York City.	Contributing artist to Hayden Planetarium's "SonicVision" fulldome show.
Theatre of Musical Comedy.	St. Petersburg, Russia.	Live video for "Tattooed Tongues" opera with Dutch ensemble LOOS & eNsemble from St. Petersburg, music by Martijn Padding, libretto by Friso Haverkamp.
Celcit Festival.	Managua.	"The Moment Prior" with Helena Thevenot as part of "Apuntes" show.
Test-Portal	Amsterdam.	Several performances, including improv with Hoppy Kamiyama & Kirilola, screening of 'origins' performance with Walter Wright.
The New York Video Festival	Lincoln Center	Screening of 'SUBTALK' (short by Bainbridge, Abigail Child and Eric Rosenzveig) in "History Makes a Comeback" program.
MIXOLOGY Festival	New York City.	Solo and group live a/v in various collaborations with dancers, musicians and musicians at Performing Garage for the hausofouch's curation of the Roulette annual intermedia series.
The New York Video Festival	Lincoln Center	Screening of 'SUBTALK' (short by Bainbridge, Abigail Child and Eric Rosenzveig) in "History Makes a Comeback" program.
Boston CyberArts Festival "Origins and VIsual Improvisation Symposium"	Boston.	Live performances (including duo with Walter Wright), workshops, panels, screenings and an installation of the "TRIGGERS" video jukebox.
Splice Festival	Pittsburgh	Live 2 channel a/v performance at Carnegie Mellon University Fest, solo and with Colongib + Shiv and the students of CMU.
Centro de Experimentación del Teatro Colón	Buenos Aires.	Live video composition/performances for John King's experimental opera "La Belle Captive."
Sonic Light	Amsterdam	VJ' performances, screenings and conduct analog A/V synthesis workshop.
651 Arts	Tribeca Performing Arts Center, New York City	"Dog, Dog"

=== 2002 ===
Title	Place	Description
	American Museum of the Moving Image, NYC.	Live audiovisuals with Johnny deKam for <ALT> DigitalMedia opening.
TRANSCINEMA 2002	San Jose & San Francisco.	"Pale Blue Dot" solo A/V set. (also 2000)
DCTV/MNN	New York City	UNITYGAIN TV- solo A/V performance, cablecast, webcast.
International Ballet Festival	Miami	"The Moment Prior" with dancer/choreographer Helena Thevenot.
VIDARTE	Mexico City.	screening of "Karma".
"The Moment Prior".	San Francisco Butoh Festival	
Musik and Machines	Berlin.	Present & perform at Love Parade VJ Panel.
Inventionen Festival	Berlin	Live Video for Fast Forward's "Signal to Noise".
UNITYGAIN	Chashama, NYC	Co-produced events with David Linton and live video performances with live electronic musicians. [also 2001]
"Pale Blue Dot"	ROULETTE, New York City.	solo 'live movie' performance.
Cambridge Poetry Festival	Cambridge, UK.	"Karma" screening.
Phonotaktik 'Musikkreis MS-20 Sessionen.	Austrian Cultural Forum, New York City.	Improvised video and music on the Korg MS-20 with Viennese and American musicians.
BATOFAR.	Paris, France.	Live visuals with Vishwanath Owen Bush, Baby Zazonie and solo.
DCTV/MNN	New York City	UNITYGAIN TV- 3 VJ mix, cablecast, webcast.

=== 2001 ===
Title	Place	Description
"999x10^95"	Sammlung ESSL, Vienna	Projection design for video opera inspired by Adolf Wölfli with text and music composed by Matthew Ostrowski.
Tigertail's FLA/BRA Festival	MOCA, Miami.	"The Moment Prior" with choreographer/performer Helena Thevenot.
Unitygain	The Kitchen, NYC.	Co-produced event with David Linton and live video mix with Jeremy Bernstein and Anney Bonney along with electronic musicians.
One Step Beyond	American Museum of Natural History.	Visual designer, co-producer of video/lighting (with Glowing Pictures) for American Museum of Natural History's monthly party since its inception in 2007.

=== 2000 ===
Title	Place	Description
Triggers	The Kitchen, NYC.	A/V jukebox installation.
"Here, Shimmering, Gone"	The Kitchen, NYC.	performance/demonstration/lecture.
Tigertail's FLA/BRA Festival	Miami.	"Dog Dog" with choreographer/dancer Giovanni Luquini and DJ le Spam
Unitygain	Galapagos, Brooklyn.	Resident 'VJ' and co-producer of monthly live electronic A/V event. [also 1999]
memoryscan	92nd St. Playhouse, New York City	Live video with DanceKumikoKimoto's dance theater production.
"Feeding Frenzy"	Miami Beach	Live video for Fast Forward's "Feeding Frenzy" at a Tigertail fundraiser

=== 1999 ===
Title	Place	Description
Transcinema	San Francisco	"Hugged In Fog" and "This Week's Bliss."
Miami Light Festival	Miami	Live video with DanceKumikoKimoto's "memoryscan".
STEIM	Amsterdam	with David Linton.
Seances d'ecoute	Metafor d'Aubervilliers, Paris.	with David Linton and Hahn Rowe.

=== 1995 ===
Title	Place	Description
2nd Festival de Music del Segle XX	Mercat de les Flors, Barcelona.	Nancy Meli Walker and Bainbridge perform live video with flautist Barbara Held's "The Physics of Sound."

=== 1994 ===
Title	Place	Description
	Valencia Theatre, San Francisco.	Live performance with Pamela Z and Elise Kermani.

1993

KOMOTION, San Francisco. "Barriers" video installation.

=== 1993 ===
Title	Place	Description
Gargoyle Mechanique	New York City.	Live performance as "Valued Cu$tomer" with 99
Komotion International	San Francisco.	"Barriers" video installation.

=== 1992 ===
Title	Place	Description
Artists' Television Access	San Francisco.	performance with 99 Hooker and M. Stephens.

=== 1989 ===
Title	Place	Description
"Betabet"	MOMA, New York	"Betabet" screens as part of F/VA 21 show.

== Residencies ==
Year	Residency
2014-2015	SignalCulture, NYC, Artist-in-Residence
2010	ALFRED UNIVERSITY, NY, Artist-in-Residence with Minou Maguna
2006-2007	EYEBEAM ART & TECHNOLOGY CENTER, NYC. Inaugural Education Fellow.
1989-2005	EXPERIMENTAL TELEVISION CENTER, Owego, NY. Numerous artist residencies.

2010

== Awards ==
Year	Award
2010	BRONX RECOGNIZES ITS OWN/BRIO, Bronx Council on the Arts Video Artist Honoree.
1999	BESSIE AWARDS, Dance Theater Workshop's New York Dance and Performance Award for Video Design (shared with Caspar Stracke).

== Collections ==
Collection
The Kitchen, NYC.
EXPERIMENTAL TELEVISION CENTER, NY
AUTOMATEN, Berlin

Bainbridge also curates, teaches and advises on video art and tech. For Lincoln Center's New York Video Festival, Benton C co-curated Synaesthesiologists, a festival of dozens of shorts in a feature-length overview of the global audiovisuals scene. At UAMA high school in Brooklyn, Bainbridge started the first VJ class in the U.S. public education system, going on to teach students ranging from pre-teen to post-graduate as Eyebeam Art and Technology Center's inaugural Education Fellow.
