= Sports in Philadelphia =

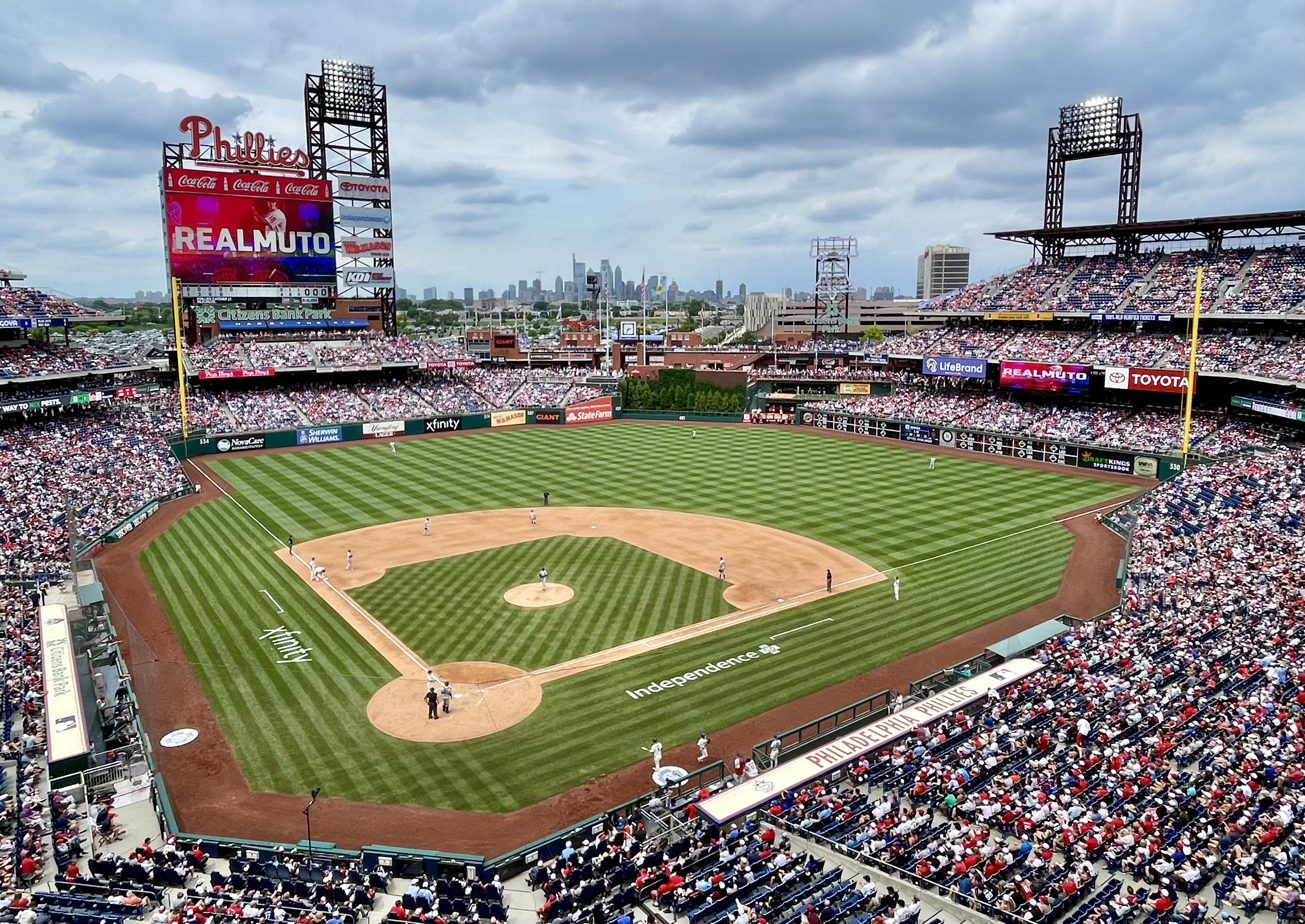
Citizens Bank Park in South Philadelphia, home of the Philadelphia Phillies of Major League Baseball, the oldest continuous, one-name, one-city franchise in all of professional American sports, dating back to 1883

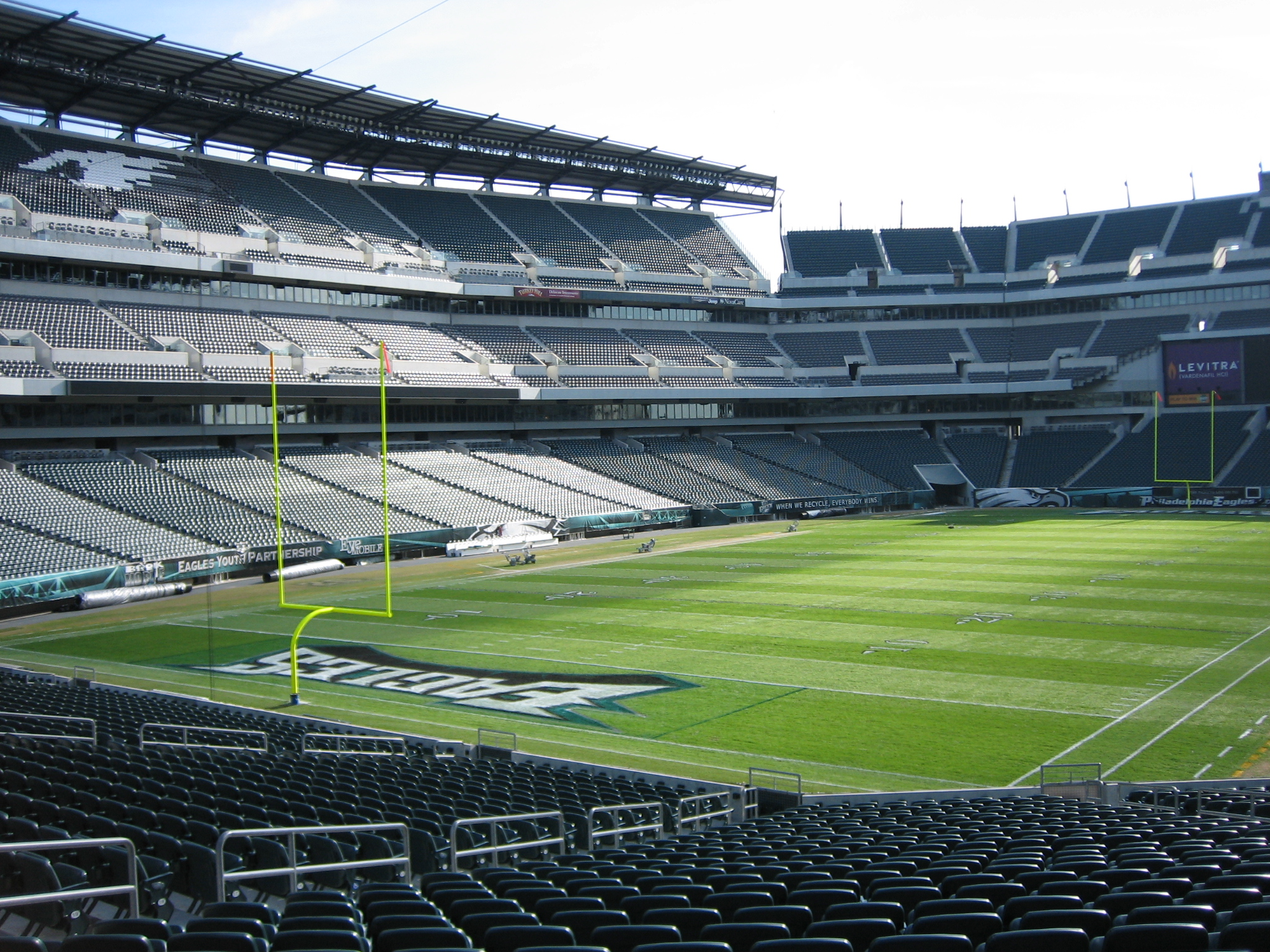
Lincoln Financial Field in South Philadelphia, home of the Philadelphia Eagles of the National Football League

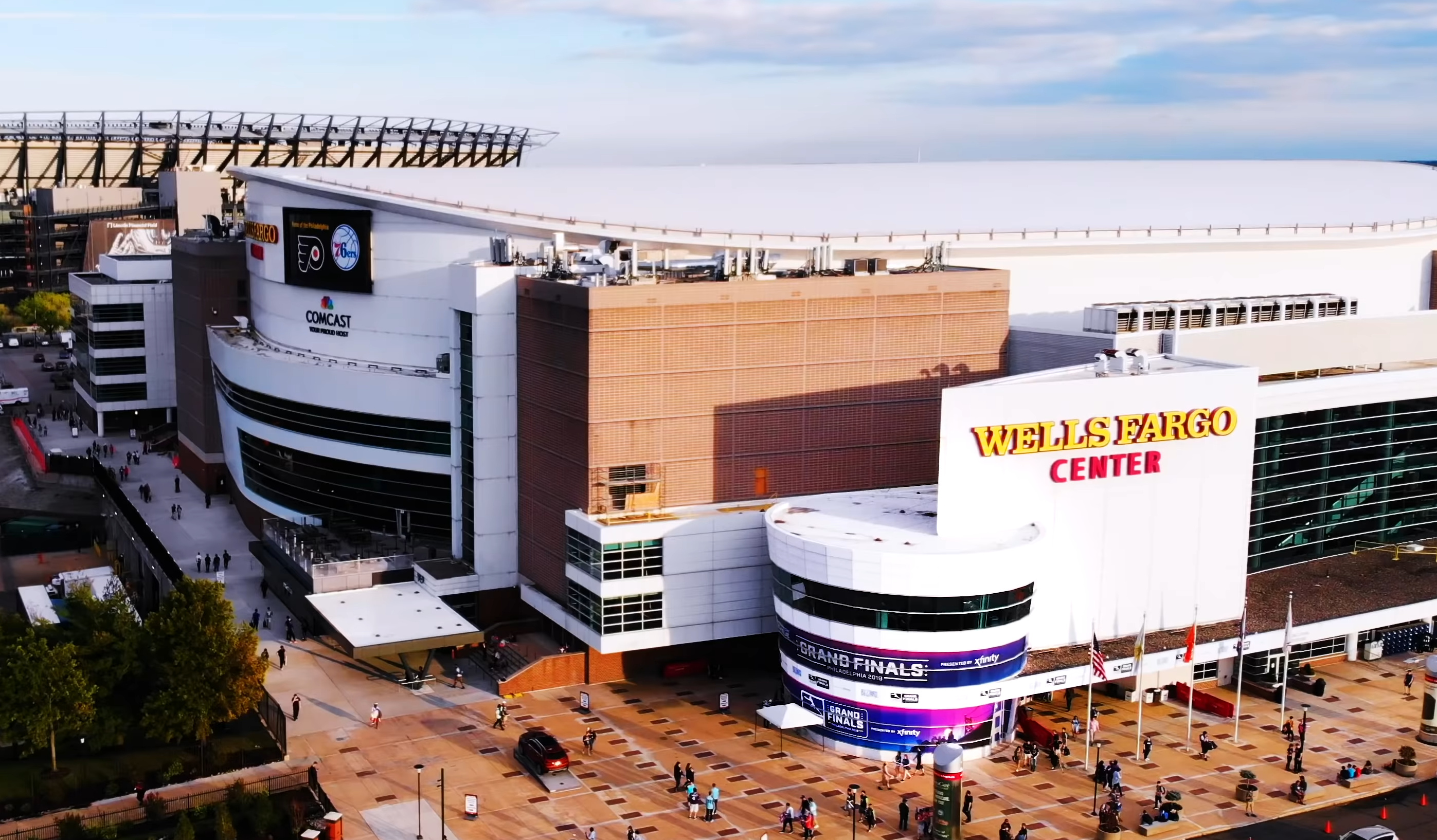
Xfinity Mobile Arena in South Philadelphia, home of the Philadelphia Flyers of the National Hockey League and the Philadelphia 76ers of the National Basketball Association

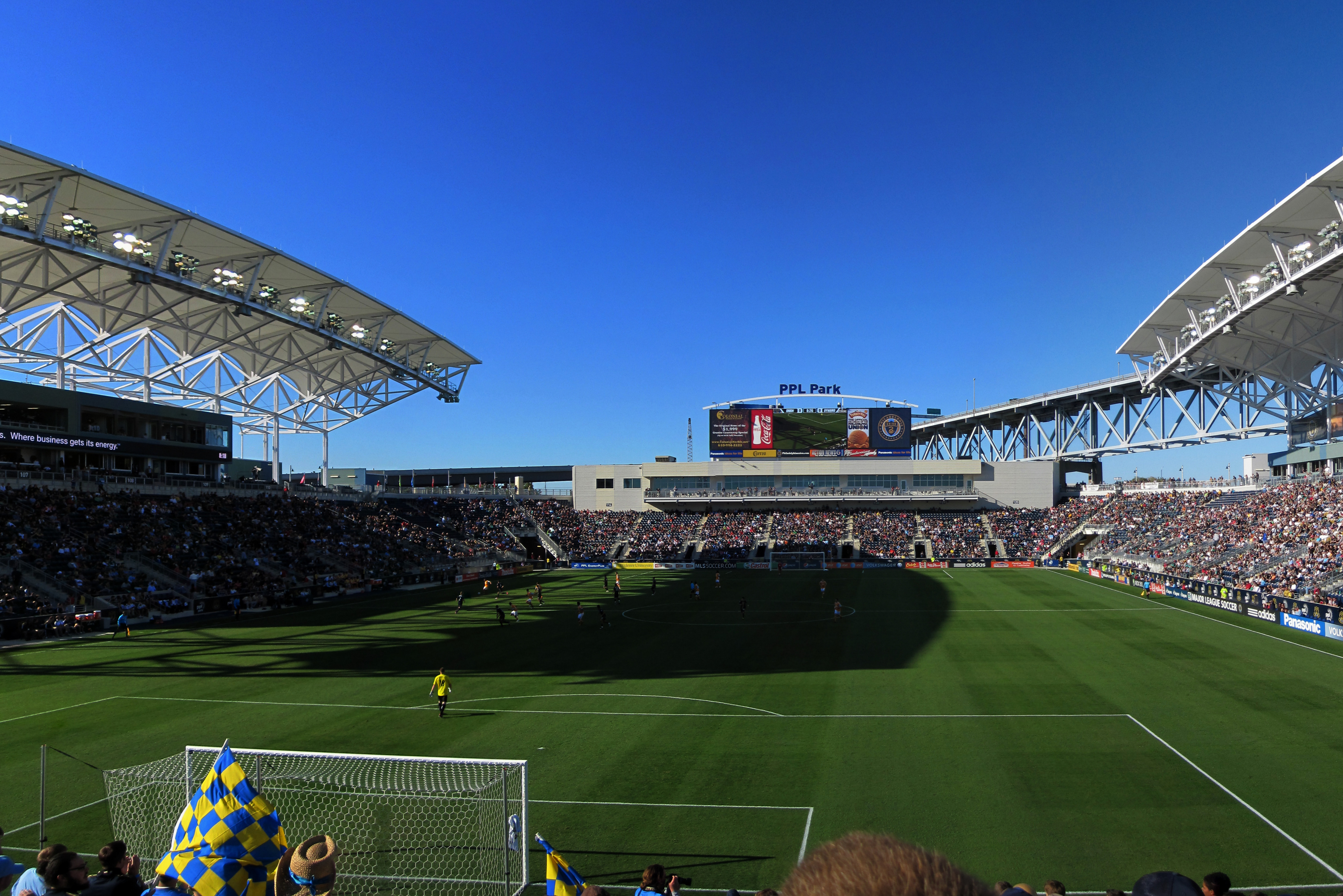
Subaru Park in Chester, home of the Philadelphia Union of Major League Soccer

Philadelphia has one of the United States' longest and richest traditions in professional, semi-professional, amateur, college, and high school sports. The city is one of twelve cities that host teams in each of the major professional sports leagues in the United States and Canada, and one of just four cities in North America in which one team from every league plays within its city limits.

The major sports teams are the Philadelphia Phillies of Major League Baseball (MLB), the Philadelphia Eagles of the National Football League (NFL), the Philadelphia 76ers of the National Basketball Association (NBA) and the Philadelphia Flyers of the National Hockey League (NHL). Each team has played in Philadelphia since at least the 1960s, and each team has won at least two championships. Since 2010, the Philadelphia metropolitan area has also been the home of the Philadelphia Union of Major League Soccer (MLS), making the Philadelphia market one of only nine cities in North America to host a team in the five major sports leagues. Prior to the 1980s, Philadelphia was home to several other notable professional franchises, including the Philadelphia Athletics, the Frankford Yellow Jackets, the Philadelphia Warriors, the Philadelphia Quakers, Philadelphia Atoms, and the Philadelphia Field Club.

Sports play a significant role in the culture of the city and the surrounding area. Philadelphia sports fans are known for their passion for their teams. Philadelphia fans, particularly Phillies and Eagles fans, have a reputation for being the "Meanest Fans in America". Philadelphia's fans, combined with the history and tradition of the city's teams have often led the city to be described as the nation's best sports city.

Metropolitan Philadelphia hosts several college sports teams as well. The Philadelphia Big 5 is an informal association of college basketball programs in Philadelphia, historically consisting of La Salle University, the University of Pennsylvania, Saint Joseph's University, Temple University, and Villanova University and also including Drexel University as of the 2023–24 school year. These six schools, along with Delaware State University and the University of Delaware, all represent Greater Philadelphia in NCAA Division I, while several other area schools field teams in other divisions of the NCAA. Temple and Delaware field the lone Division I FBS football teams in the region, though many Philadelphia fans root for other programs, such as the Penn State Nittany Lions.

In addition to the major professional and college sports, numerous semi-pro, amateur, community, and high school teams play in Philadelphia. The city hosts numerous sporting events, such as the Penn Relays and the Collegiate Rugby Championship, and Philadelphia has been the most frequent host of the annual Army–Navy football game. Philadelphia has also been the home of several renowned athletes and sports figures, and has played a significant role in the development of cricket and extreme wrestling in the United States.

== Professional teams ==
Philadelphia has a long history of professional sports teams. Philadelphia is one of six cities that has won at least one championship in MLB, the NBA, the NFL and the NHL. Philadelphia's combined total of 19 championships in these leagues ranks seventh among North American cities in total championships.

The Eagles, Flyers, Phillies, and 76ers all play their home games in the South Philadelphia Sports Complex within the city. The Eagles currently play at Lincoln Financial Field, commonly referred to as "The Linc", built in 2003. The Phillies play at Citizens Bank Park, which opened in 2004. The Flyers and 76ers share the Xfinity Mobile Arena, which opened in 1996. All three venues are within walking distance of NRG Station on SEPTA's B line, and have close access to Interstates 76 and 95. The Philadelphia Union play their home games at Subaru Park in Chester, a Philadelphia suburb roughly 13 miles (21 km) southwest of the city.

Philadelphia also has historically been home to relocated and defunct franchises. The Philadelphia Athletics, now the Athletics, of MLB, the Philadelphia Warriors, now the Golden State Warriors, of the NBA, and the Frankford Yellow Jackets of the NFL each played in Philadelphia for over a decade. Other former Philadelphia teams, including the Philadelphia Quakers of the NHL, have been more short-lived. The Warriors currently play in the San Francisco Bay Area, while the Athletics are currently playing in Sacramento until they move to Las Vegas.

In 1980, Philadelphia became the only North American city in which all four major sports teams played for their respective championships in one year, although the Phillies were the only team to win the championship. The Flyers' run to the 2010 Stanley Cup Finals made Philadelphia the first North American city to have all four of its major professional sports league teams play in the league championship finals at least once since 2000, although the Phillies and the Eagles are the only teams to have won a championship in the 21st century. Philadelphia had an odd trend of losing championship games during presidential inauguration years until recently; the Sixers, Eagles, Phillies, and Flyers collectively had an 0–8 record in such games from 1977 until 2021. On February 9, 2025, however, the Eagles broke the so-called Curse of the Inauguration, winning Super Bowl LIX just twenty days after the second inauguration of Donald Trump.

In 2011, the Phillies became the first team in the city's major professional sports history to finish the regular season in first place in five consecutive seasons. Two other teams finished first during four consecutive seasons: the 1973–77 Flyers and the 2001–04 Eagles. Five other teams finished first for three seasons in a row: the 1929–31 Athletics, 1947–49 Eagles, 1965–68 Sixers, 1976–78 Phillies, and 1984–87 Flyers.

Club	League	Division	Venue	Location	Founded	Titles	Head coach / manager	General manager
Philadelphia Phillies	MLB	NL East	Citizens Bank Park	Philadelphia	1883	2	Don Mattingly	Sam Fuld
Philadelphia Eagles	NFL	NFC East	Lincoln Financial Field	Philadelphia	1933	5	Nick Sirianni	Howie Roseman
Philadelphia 76ers	NBA	Atlantic	Xfinity Mobile Arena	Philadelphia	1946	2	Nick Nurse	Elton Brand
Philadelphia Flyers	NHL	Metropolitan	Xfinity Mobile Arena	Philadelphia	1967	2	Rick Tocchet	Daniel Briere
Philadelphia Union	MLS	Eastern	Subaru Park	Chester	2010	0	Bradley Carnell	Ernst Tanner
Philadelphia WNBA team	WNBA	Eastern	New South Philadelphia Arena	Philadelphia	2030	0	TBA	TBA

=== Baseball ===
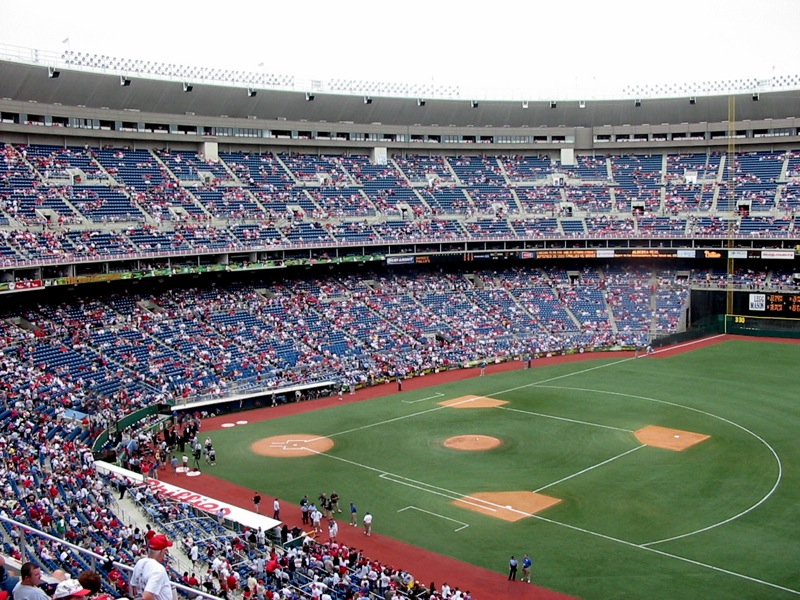
The Philadelphia Phillies final game at Veterans Stadium, a multi-purpose stadium in South Philadelphia, on September 29, 2003. The Phillies played at Veterans Stadium from 1971 until 2003. The stadium was demolished in March 2004.

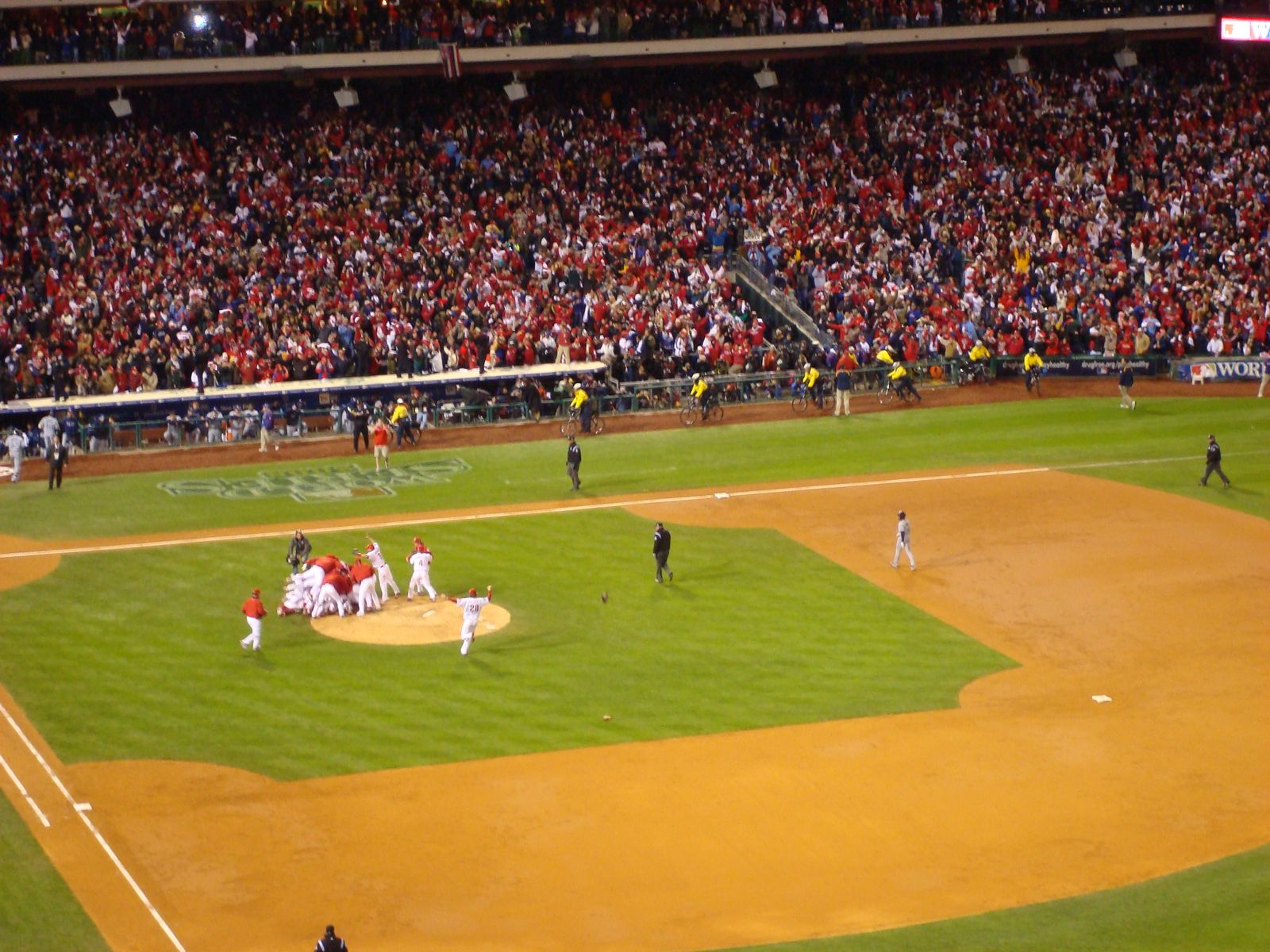
Phillies players rush the field at Citizens Bank Park after winning the 2008 World Series on October 29, 2008. The Phillies have won the World Series twice in their history, in 1980 and 2008.

The city's sole existing Major League Baseball (MLB) team is the Philadelphia Phillies. Founded in 1883, the team is the oldest continuous, one-name, one-city franchise in all of professional American sports. The Phillies compete in the National League East and have won the World Series twice, in 1980 and 2008. The Phillies have won eight National League pennants and eleven NL East division titles. In 2007, the Phillies lost a game for the 10,000th time in franchise history; according to the Elias Sports Bureau, no professional sports franchise in any sport has lost more games. For its first 30 years, the franchise often finished in the middle of the National League. Led by pitcher Grover Cleveland Alexander, the franchise appeared in the 1915 World Series and made strong finishes in 1916 and 1917. After trading Alexander in 1917, the franchise had one of the worst stretches in professional sports history, as it managed just one winning season between 1918 and 1948. The "Whiz Kid" Phillies, led by pitcher Robin Roberts, reached the 1950 World Series, but the team was swept by the New York Yankees. The team finished towards the middle of the pack for much of the 1950s and 1960s. After a down period in the early 1970s, third baseman Mike Schmidt and pitcher Steve Carlton led the Phillies to six playoff appearances in eight years. The Phillies won their first World Series in 1980, defeating the Kansas City Royals in six games. The Phillies also appeared in the 1983 World Series, but lost to the Baltimore Orioles. The franchise had just one winning season between 1987 and 2000, although the 1993 Phillies appeared in the 1993 World Series, losing to the Toronto Blue Jays. The franchise experienced a resurgence starting in 2001, though it did not make the playoffs until 2007. From 2007 to 2011, the Phillies made the playoffs for five straight seasons, winning the 2008 World Series over the Tampa Bay Rays and also appearing in the 2009 World Series. After an 11-year playoff drought, the Phillies reached the 2022 World Series, losing to the Houston Astros in six games, and have appeared in the playoffs for the past four seasons.

The Philadelphia Athletics were founded in 1901 as one of the eight charter franchises of the American League. Like several other MLB teams, the Athletics relocated in the 1950s, moving to Kansas City after the 1954 season. The Philadelphia Athletics won the World Series in 1910, 1911, 1913, 1929, and 1930. The team won the American League pennant nine times while in Philadelphia, including a 1902 pennant victory that occurred before the start of the modern World Series. The Athletics declined after their victory in the 1930 World Series, and usually finished below .500 in the 1930s, 1940s, and 1950s. Having played 53 seasons in Philadelphia, the Athletics are the sixth-longest tenured team in major North American professional sports to relocate, behind four other baseball teams (the Braves, Giants, Dodgers, and Senators) and one football team (the Chargers). The Athletics would later relocate to Oakland after the 1967 season, becoming the Oakland Athletics, and plans are now in place for the Athletics to relocate to Las Vegas in 2028. Philadelphia Athletics players such as Lefty Grove, Jimmie Foxx, and Al Simmons have been inducted into the Philadelphia Sports Hall of Fame, as has long-time manager and owner Connie Mack, who holds the record for most games managed, won, and lost. While the Athletics played in Philadelphia, they frequently played the Phillies in exhibition games known as the City Series. However, the teams never met in the World Series, and did not play each other in the regular season until 2003 (after the introduction of interleague play). Under the current MLB regular season scheduling structure, the Athletics play one series in Philadelphia against the Phillies in even-numbered years.

Before the integration of Major League Baseball following World War II, Philadelphia was the home of numerous Negro league teams playing in various leagues. The Philadelphia Pythians played from 1867 to 1887, and were one of the top early black baseball clubs. Shortly after the end of the Civil War, the Pythians tried to join the National League but were denied membership. The Philadelphia Giants were a Negro league team that played from 1902 to 1911. The Hilldale Club played as an independent and in several leagues from 1910 to 1932. The Philadelphia Tigers played in the Eastern Colored League in 1928. Two franchises played in the second incarnation of the Negro National League: the Philadelphia Stars played from 1934 to 1948, while the Bacharach Giants played in the league in 1934. In 2020, Major League Baseball retroactively extended major league recognition to seven negro leagues, making the Giants, the Tigers, the Hilldale Club, the Bacharach Giants, and the Stars major league franchises for part or all of their existences. The Hilldale Club and the Stars, two of the longest lasting Negro League franchises, were both led by local postal official Ed Bolden. Hilldale was defeated in the inaugural Negro World Series of 1924 but won the following year in 1925, while the Stars won the Negro National League championship in 1934.

The first game in the history of Major League Baseball was played in Philadelphia, on Saturday, April 22, 1876, at the Jefferson Street Grounds. The Boston Red Caps defeated the Philadelphia Athletics, 6–5, in the inaugural game of the National League. These Athletics (officially known as the Athletic Base Ball Club of Philadelphia) were formed in 1860, and played in the National Association of Base Ball Players (NABBP), then the National Association (NA), and finally the National League (NL; for only one year). The Athletics won the inaugural National Association title, making the franchise the winner of arguably the first title in major league history. After the end of the 1876 season, the franchise folded, having been expelled from the National League for refusing to make a late-season road trip. Three other franchises would later use the name "Athletics", including the now–Oakland Athletics. Though the 1860–76 Athletics were the first prominent Philadelphia baseball club, the history of baseball in Philadelphia extends to even before the Athletics, as Philadelphians were playing town ball by the 1820s.

=== Basketball ===
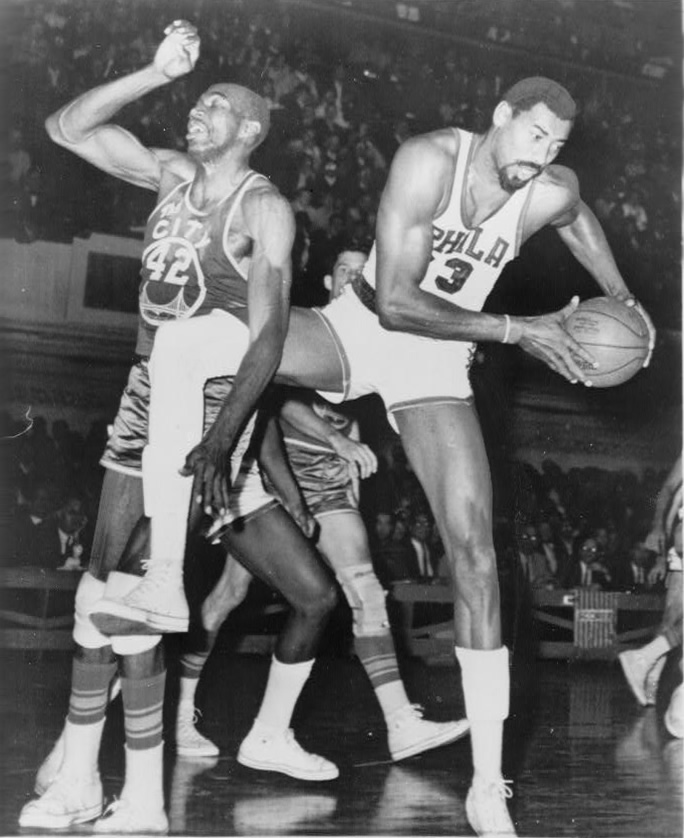
Four-time NBA MVP Wilt Chamberlain (right) of the Philadelphia 76ers and former Golden State Warriors teammate Nate Thurmond

The Philadelphia 76ers (commonly referred to as the Sixers) represent Philadelphia in the NBA. The franchise, which plays in the Atlantic Division of the Eastern Conference, has won three NBA championships, nine conference titles, and five division titles. As of 2026, the Sixers have the third-most wins in NBA history. The franchise began in 1946, as the Syracuse Nationals in the National Basketball League (NBL). In 1949, the Nationals were one of seven NBL teams that merged with the BAA to form the NBA. The franchise won its first championship in 1955 as the Nationals. After moving to Philadelphia in 1963 and being renamed the 76ers, the franchise acquired Wilt Chamberlain and experienced a great period of success. The team won a then-record 68 games and the championship in the 1966–67 season, making it the only team besides the Boston Celtics to win an NBA championship in the 1960s. The franchise missed the playoffs for four consecutive seasons in the early 1970s, and the 1972–73 Sixers hold the NBA record for most losses in one season, with 73. However, the team quickly bounced back after it acquired Julius Erving, reaching the NBA Finals three times from 1977 to 1982. After the addition of Moses Malone, the Sixers won their third championship in 1983. The franchise continued to experience success after drafting Charles Barkley in 1984 until he was traded away in the early 1990s. The Sixers missed the playoffs for seven straight seasons until the emergence of Allen Iverson, who led the team to the 2001 Finals. The team hovered around .500 for most of the 2000s decade, and missed the playoffs from 2013 to 2017 in an era popularly known as "The Process". However, with the rise of star center Joel Embiid, the Sixers have reached the postseason in eight of the past nine seasons. In 1996, the NBA named the 1967 and 1983 championship-winning teams two of the ten greatest teams in NBA history.

The Philadelphia Warriors played in Philadelphia from 1946 to 1962 before moving to San Francisco and becoming the Golden State Warriors. The Philadelphia Warriors won two championships and three conference titles during that time. The team won its first championship in 1946–47, the inaugural season of the Basketball Association of America (BAA). Following the merger between the BAA and the National Basketball League that formed the NBA, the Philadelphia Warriors won their second title in 1956. While a member of the Philadelphia Warriors, Wilt Chamberlain set several NBA records. Perhaps his most well-known achievement was scoring 100 points in a game against the New York Knicks. The Philadelphia Sports Hall of Fame has inducted Paul Arizin, Neil Johnston, Joe Fulks, and other people associated with the Philadelphia Warriors. The Warriors franchise moved to San Francisco in 1962 and became the San Francisco (now Golden State) Warriors. The Warriors and Sixers/Nationals have met in the playoffs ten times, most recently in the 1967 NBA Finals, where the 76ers defeated the Warriors in six games. Philadelphia went one season without an NBA franchise before the Syracuse Nationals moved to Philadelphia and became the Philadelphia 76ers. In the lone season that Philadelphia lacked an NBA franchise, the American Basketball League, which had been started in 1961 by Abe Saperstein as an attempt to compete with the NBA, moved a franchise to region. Both the team (the Philadelphia Tapers) and the league folded in December 1962.

On June 30, 2025, the Women's National Basketball Association (WNBA) announced that Philadelphia will become home to a team which will begin play in the 2030 season. The team, which has not yet been named, will be based in South Philadelphia.

=== Football ===
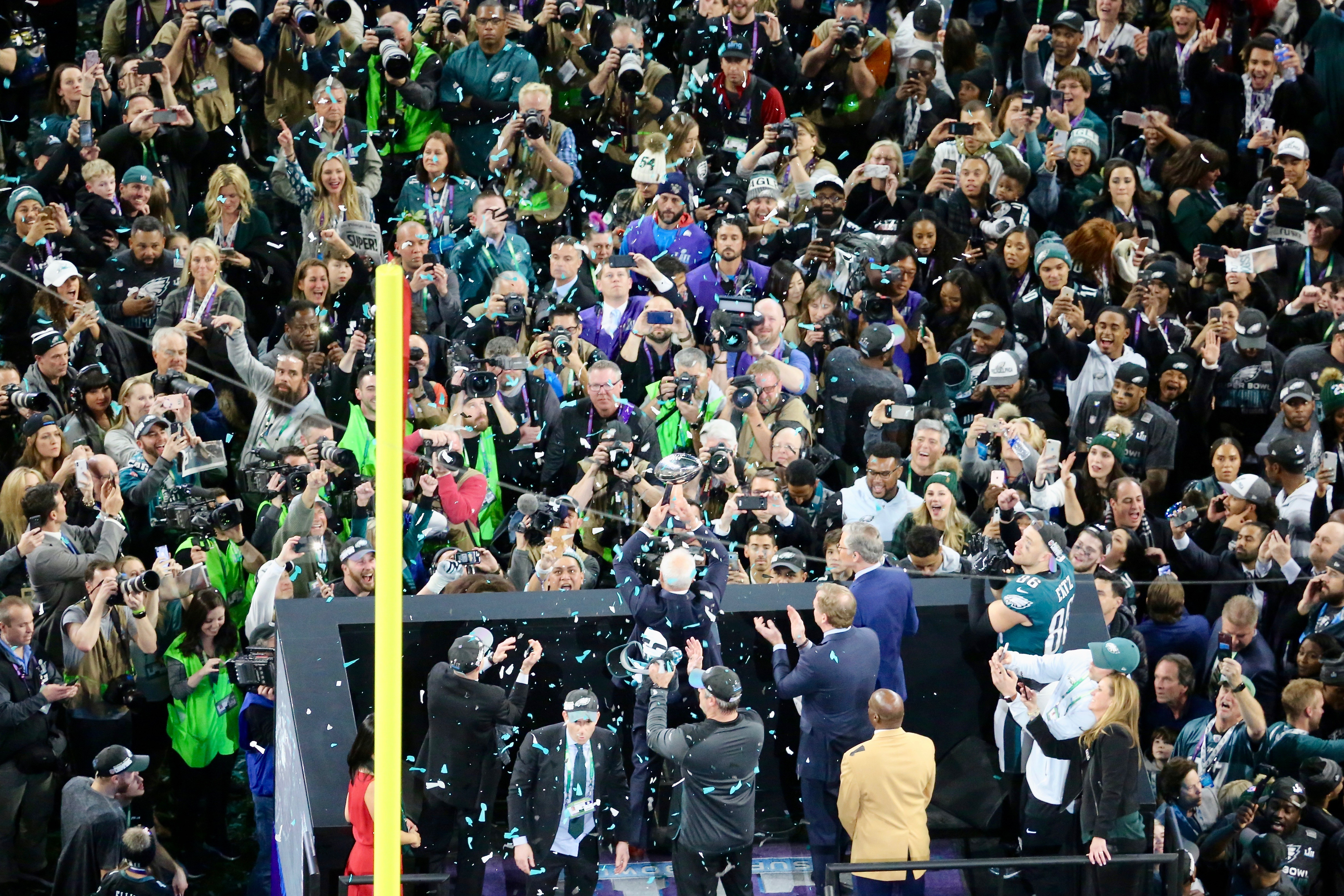
The Philadelphia Eagles are presented with the Vince Lombardi Trophy after winning Super Bowl LII, February 4, 2018

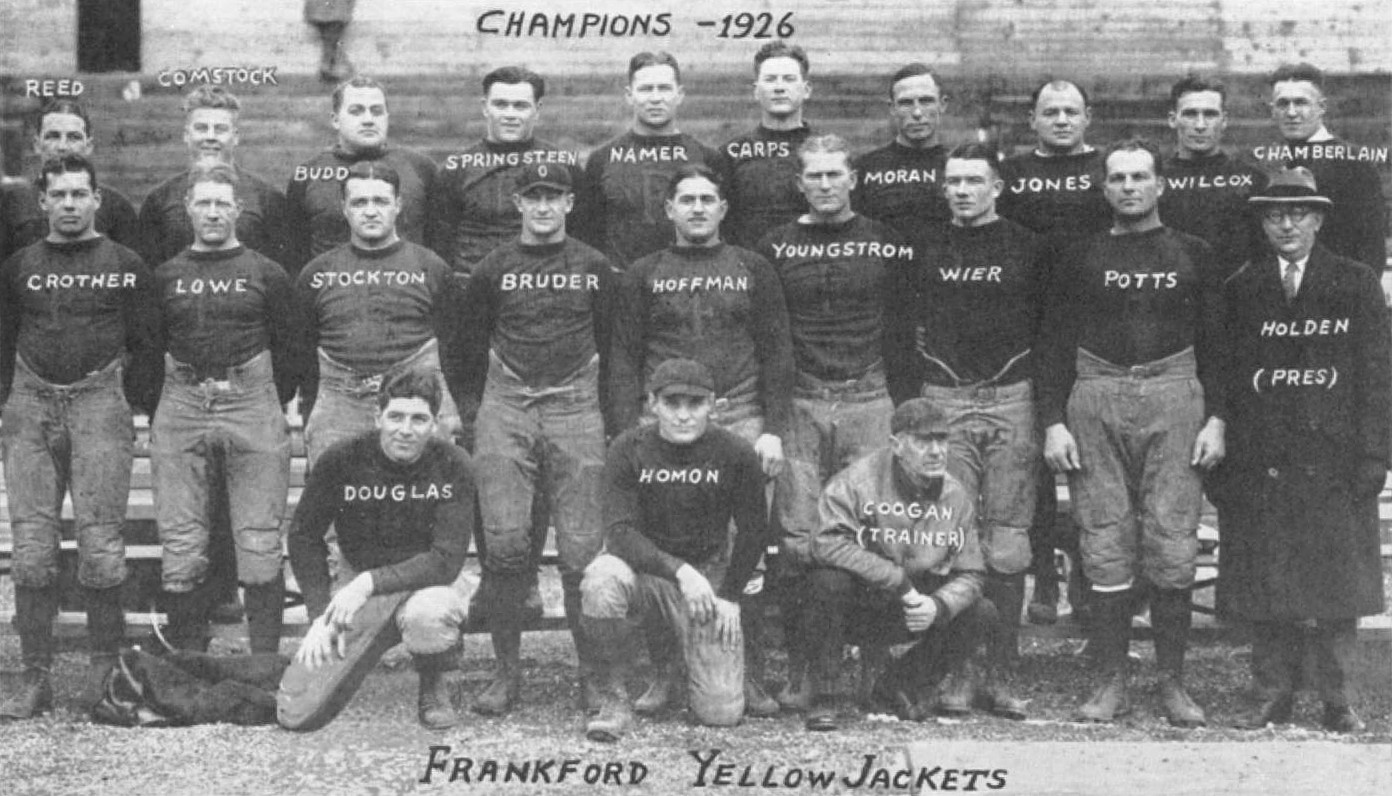
The Frankford Yellow Jackets team photo in 1926. Launched in 1899, the Yellow Jackets were Philadelphia's first professional football team and won the 1926 NFL season with a season record of 14–1–2.

The Philadelphia Eagles, founded in 1933, are members of the East Division of the National Football Conference (NFC) in the National Football League (NFL). They have operated continuously since then, with the partial exception of the 1943 season, when the Eagles temporarily merged with the Pittsburgh Steelers to become the Steagles due to players leaving for military service during World War II. The Eagles won three pre-Super Bowl era NFL championships in 1948, 1949 and 1960, six conference championships, and 16 division championships. They have made five Super Bowl appearances, losing in Super Bowl XV (1980), Super Bowl XXXIX (2004) and Super Bowl LVII (2022), and winning Super Bowl LII (2017) and Super Bowl LIX (2024).

In its early history in the 1930s, the franchise frequently finished at the bottom of the standings. They improved in the 1940s, becoming the only NFL team to win back-to-back championships in 1948 and 1949 by shutout. Though the franchise was average for much of the 1950s, the 1960 championship-winning Eagles were the only team to defeat the Vince Lombardi-coached Green Bay Packers in a playoff game. The Eagles did not experience much success in the 1960s and early 1970s, but under the command of head coach Dick Vermeil, the franchise made four straight playoff appearances starting in 1978, including a Super Bowl appearance in 1980. After another down period, the franchise made the playoffs in six of nine seasons between 1988 and 1996. Andy Reid was hired as head coach in 1999, and across 14 seasons he led the franchise to nine playoff appearances and a run to Super Bowl XXXIX. After Chip Kelly's three-year tenure as head coach, the Eagles hired Doug Pederson, a former offensive coordinator under Reid. The Eagles defeated the New England Patriots in Super Bowl LII to win their first Super Bowl in franchise history. Nick Sirianni was named head coach in 2021 and lead the Eagles to a berth in Super Bowl LVII and a win in Super Bowl LIX two years later. In 1994, defensive end Reggie White, running back Steve Van Buren, and two-way players Chuck Bednarik and Pete Pihos were named to the National Football League 75th Anniversary All-Time Team.

The city's first professional football team was the Frankford Yellow Jackets. Originally a community athletic-association team in the Frankford neighborhood of Northeast Philadelphia dating back to 1899, the club became one of the early NFL clubs in 1924. The Yellow Jackets won the NFL championship in 1926. Its home field was Frankford Stadium (also called Yellow Jacket Field). Financial troubles brought on by the Great Depression and a fire at Frankford Stadium led to the club disbanding after the 1931 season. Pro Football Hall of Famers Guy Chamberlin and William R. Lyman both played for the Yellow Jackets.

Metropolitan Philadelphia area has had three other football teams that played in the NFL or in leagues that attempted to compete with the NFL. The Philadelphia Quakers played one season in Philadelphia as part of the American Football League, a fledgling league intent on challenging the NFL as the premier football league in the country. The team took its name from the Union Quakers of Philadelphia, a local club which had been denied entry into the American Professional Football Association (as the NFL was known before 1922). The AFL Quakers won the league championship in 1926, giving Philadelphia two football championships in one year, as the Frankford Yellow Jackets won the 1926 NFL title. However, both the AFL and the Quakers folded after just one season of existence. The Philadelphia Bell was a franchise of the World Football League, which operated from 1974 to 1975 and attempted to challenge the NFL's dominance. The league was founded by Gary Davidson, who had also led the founding of World Hockey Association and the American Basketball Association, but the WFL folded after only two years and no teams were absorbed into the NFL. The Bell played its home games in John F. Kennedy Stadium in South Philadelphia, and they employed the first African-American head coach in modern professional football history (retired Hall of Fame safety Willie Wood).

The Philadelphia Stars were a football team in the United States Football League (USFL), a league that attempted to compete with the NFL for three seasons in the 1980s. The Stars, playing at Veterans Stadium, won the 1984 league championship in their second season in Philadelphia, but the franchise moved to Baltimore for the league's final season in 1985. The team was coached by Jim Mora, who went on to a successful coaching career in the NFL, and among its players were future NFL Pro Bowlers Sam Mills and Sean Landeta (who later played for the Philadelphia Eagles). Unlike the NFL, the league played in the spring and summer, but it folded after a failed antitrust lawsuit and an aborted attempt to directly compete with the NFL in the fall. In 2022, the Philadelphia Stars name and iconography were resurrected with a team in the new USFL (although all games were played in Birmingham, Alabama). In their first season, the Stars reached the USFL championship game, but fell to the Birmingham Stallions. In 2023, the USFL merged with the XFL to form the United Football League, and it was announced that the Stars franchise would not be folded into the new league.

=== Ice hockey ===
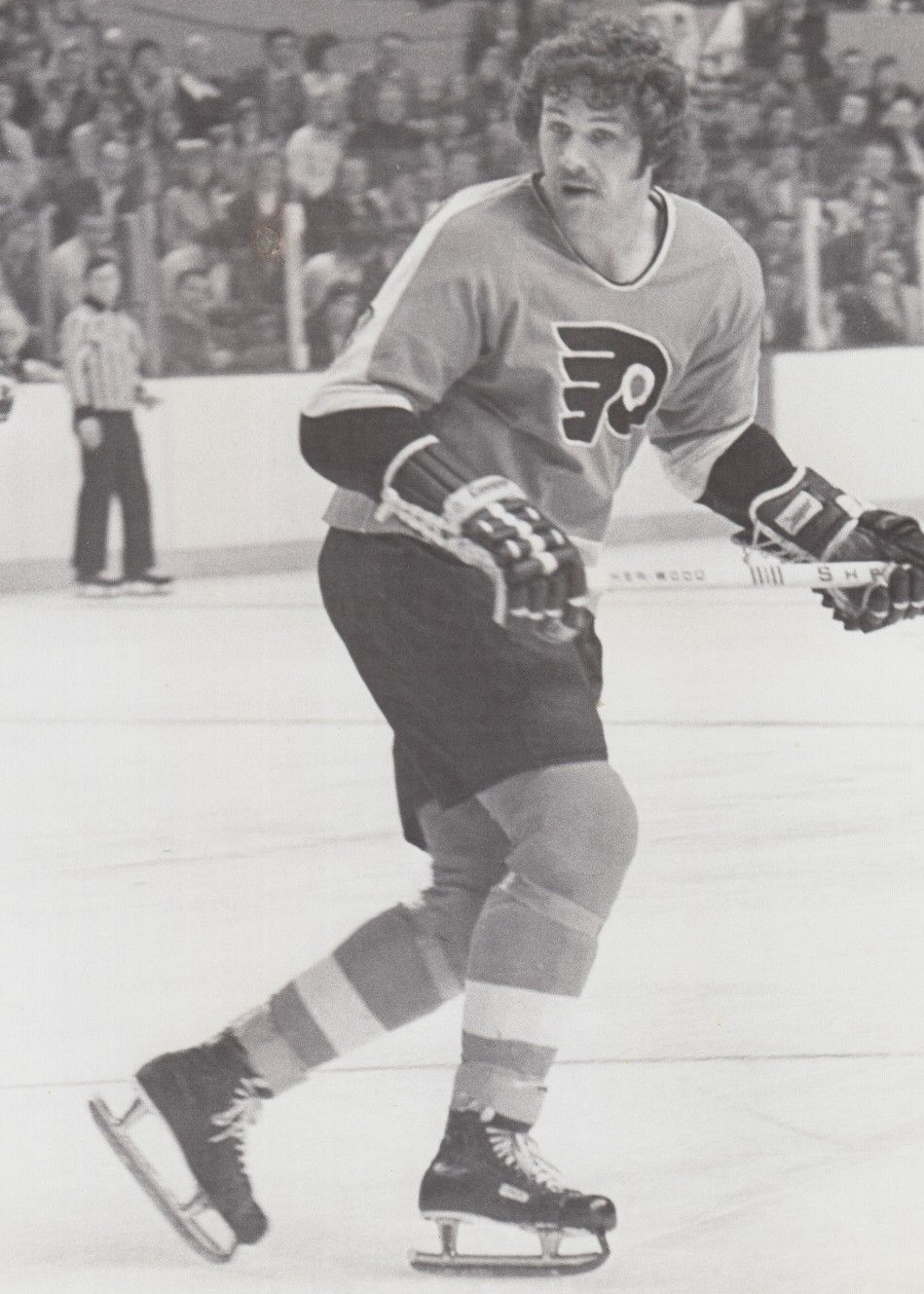
Dave Schultz, who played for the Philadelphia Flyers from 1971 to 1976, helped lead the Flyers to two Stanley Cup victories while also helping establish their reputation as the Broad Street Bullies, setting the all-time NHL record for most penalty minutes in a season (472 in 1973–74).

The Philadelphia Flyers were one of six teams that the National Hockey League (NHL) added as part of the 1967 NHL expansion, which ended the Original Six era. The Flyers play in the Metropolitan Division of the Eastern Conference and have won two Stanley Cup championships in 1974 and 1975. The Flyers were the first non-Original Six team to win the Stanley Cup since the Montreal Maroons won the cup in 1935. The Flyers have won eight conference championships and 16 division championships. The Flyers were particularly successful in the 1970s, where the team won back-to-back Stanley Cups, appeared in a third consecutive Stanley Cup Finals in 1976, defeated HC CSKA Moscow (the Soviet "Red Army team") in a famous exhibition game, and, in the 1979–80 season, set the record for the longest unbeaten streak in NHL history. The 1970s Flyers earned the nickname "Broad Street Bullies" for their aggressive style of play, and the nickname is still applied to the franchise. Flyers enforcer Dave Schultz holds the record for most penalty minutes in a season, with 472. The franchise experienced success even after the retirement of Hall of Famer Bobby Clarke, making additional Stanley Cup Final appearances in 1985 and 1987. After a down period in the early 1990s, Hart Trophy-winner Eric Lindros helped lead the team to the 1997 Stanley Cup Final and a string of playoff appearances. The team made another Stanley Cup Final appearance in 2010, but lost in six games to the Chicago Blackhawks. As of 2026, the Flyers have accrued the fourth-highest points percentage of all NHL franchises, and have appeared in the playoffs in 41 out of 59 seasons of existence.

Philadelphia has had only brief experiences with top-level hockey aside from the Flyers. The Philadelphia Quakers were a NHL team that played only one full season, 1930–31, at the Philadelphia Arena. The franchise, which had moved from Pittsburgh, folded after its only season in Philadelphia, during which the club set a record for the lowest winning percentage and the longest losing streak in league history—records that stood for over forty years. The Quakers were one of several NHL teams that folded in the 1930s, leaving the NHL with just six teams between 1942 and the 1967 expansion that brought the NHL back to Philadelphia and to five other American cities. Len Peto attempted to bring the Montreal Maroons to Philadelphia in the 1940s, but the lack of both league support and a suitable arena prevented the Maroons from playing in Philadelphia. The Philadelphia Blazers played for one season in the World Hockey Association, a league that attempted to challenge the NHL's supremacy, using a rink constructed in Convention Hall at the Civic Center (later used by the Philadelphia Firebirds of the North American Hockey League and the American Hockey League). After the 1972–73 season, the Blazers moved to Vancouver and then Calgary, but the franchise folded in 1977. Another World Hockey Association franchise, the Jersey Knights, moved in November 1973 to the Cherry Hill Arena in Cherry Hill, New Jersey, and then relocated to San Diego before the start of the 1974–75 season.

=== Soccer ===
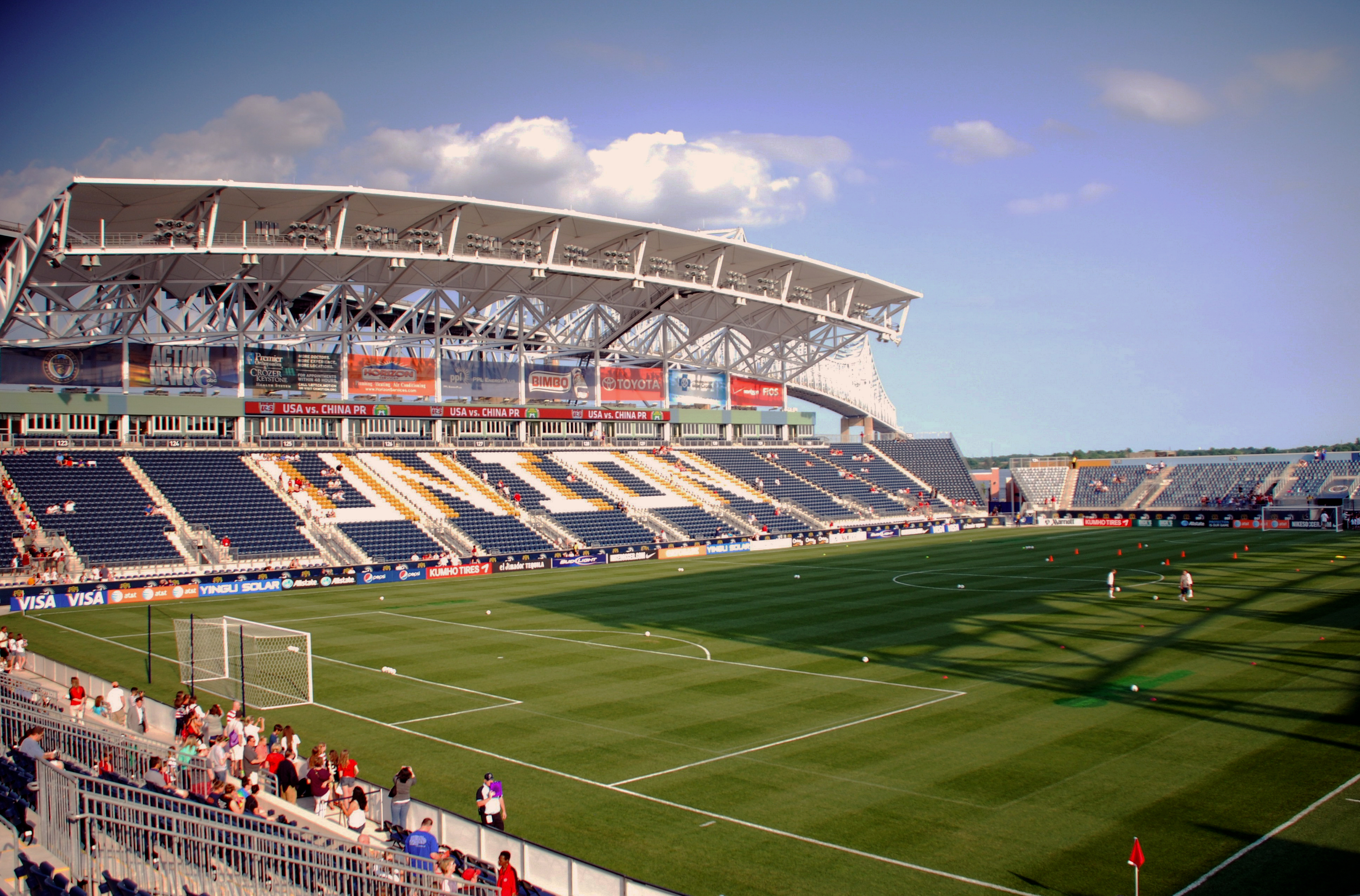
Subaru Park, home of the Philadelphia Union of Major League Soccer (MLS)

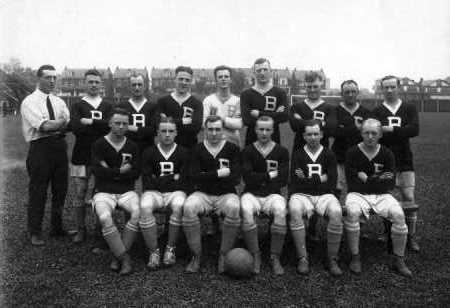
Bethlehem Steel F.C., c. July 1921

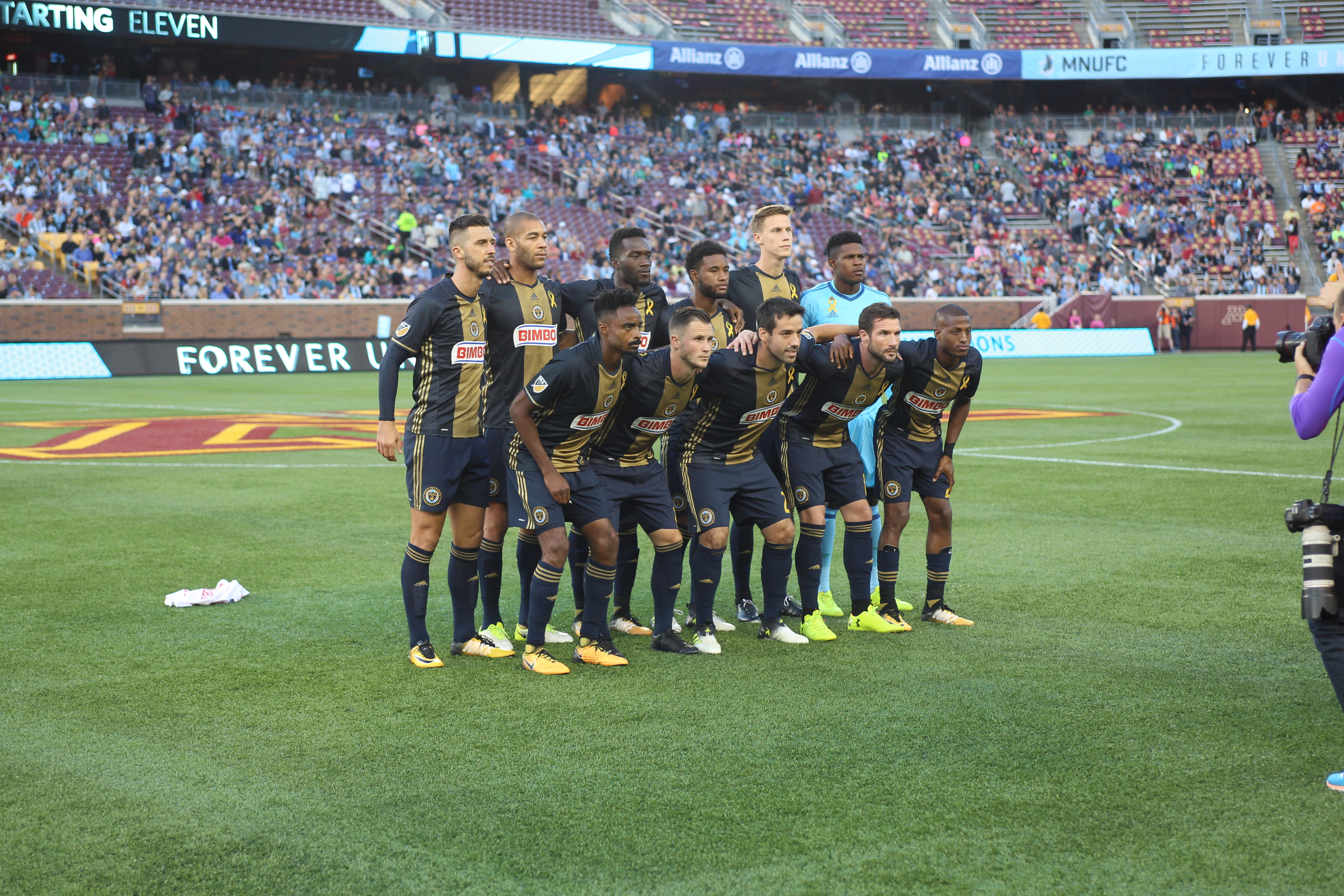
Philadelphia Union club photo in 2017

The Philadelphia Union are a Major League Soccer (MLS) team that plays in the Eastern Conference. The franchise began play in 2010. The Union play at Subaru Park, a soccer-specific stadium located in Chester, Pennsylvania. The Sons of Ben is an independent supporters group that helped bring the Union to the Philadelphia area and continues to support the Union. The Union's top affiliate is Philadelphia Union II. Originally known as Bethlehem Steel FC as a tribute to the early 20th century soccer powerhouse, the team began play in 2015 in the second-level United Soccer League, now known as the USL Championship. Steel FC played its first four seasons at Goodman Stadium in Bethlehem, Pennsylvania, but moved to Subaru Park for at least the 2019 season because Goodman Stadium no longer meets league stadium requirements. Steel FC was renamed Union II in advance of the 2020 season, and went on hiatus for the 2021 season. Union II returned the next year as one of the inaugural teams of MLS Next Pro, an MLS-operated third-level league made up mainly of MLS reserve sides.

The Union have also reached the U.S. Open Cup final three times, in 2014, 2015 and 2018. In 2020, the Union won the Supporters' Shield, given to the team in MLS with the best regular season record, the first major trophy in the team's history. In 2022, the Union reached their first MLS Cup, but were defeated by Los Angeles FC in penalties after tying 3–3.

The original Bethlehem Steel F.C. was one of the most successful early American soccer clubs; the club was sponsored by the Bethlehem Steel Corporation and played from 1907 to 1930. The club won league championships in two semi-professional leagues, the AAFBA and the NAFBL. For the inaugural 1921–1922 season of the professional American Soccer League, Bethlehem Steel F.C. moved to Philadelphia and competed as the Philadelphia Field Club. The team won the first American Soccer League championship, but moved back to Bethlehem and reverted to its original name. Three other franchises also competed as the Philadelphia Field Club, giving Philadelphia continuous representation in the ASL between 1921 and 1929 (although the second incarnation of Philadelphia Field Club changed its name to the Philadelphia Celtic for one season). During the 1924–25 season, Fleisher Yarn joined the ASL, giving Philadelphia two teams. Excluding the first incarnation of the Philadelphia Field Club, the Philadelphia ASL teams experienced little success. The ASL was one of the most popular sports leagues in the country before it dissolved due to the onset of the Great Depression and disagreements with the United States Football Association and FIFA. After returning to Bethlehem, Bethlehem Steel F.C. won a second ASL championship in 1927, and then played in the Eastern Professional Soccer League from 1928 to 1929, winning the league championship in both seasons. The EPSL and ASL merged after the 1929 season, but Bethlehem Steel FC folded in 1930 and the ASL collapsed in 1933. Bethlehem Steel F.C. won the U.S. Open Cup five times, which remains a record (shared with Maccabee Los Angeles). The club also won the American Cup six times. Hall of Fame Bethlehem Steel players include Jock Ferguson, Robert Millar, Harry Ratican, Tommy Fleming, and Archie Stark, whose international record of 70 goals in one season stood for 87 years before it was broken by Lionel Messi in 2012. In 2013, the Philadelphia Union unveiled a third uniform that paid homage to Bethlehem Steel F.C.

Following the collapse of the ASL, soccer in the United States declined in popularity and the country lacked a major professional soccer league. In 1967, two major soccer leagues, the National Professional Soccer League (NPSL) and the United Soccer Association (USA), both began play. The Philadelphia Spartans, owned by Pittsburgh Steelers owner Art Rooney, played at Temple Stadium for the NPSL's lone season. After one season, both leagues merged to form the FIFA-backed, major professional North American Soccer League (NASL). The Spartans did not make the jump to the NASL, but two different franchises later represented Philadelphia. The Philadelphia Atoms played from 1973 to 1976, winning the Soccer Bowl in their inaugural 1973 season. Philadelphia goalkeeper and Pennsylvania native Bob Rigby became the first soccer player to be featured on the cover of Sports Illustrated following the club's championship. The Atoms folded after the 1976 season, having been bought by Mexican owners whose plans to move the team to San Antonio were not approved by the league. The Philadelphia Fury played from 1978 to 1980, but were bought by Molson Brewery and moved to Montreal to become the Manic. The Atoms and the Fury both played at Veterans Stadium, though the Atoms played their final season in Philadelphia at Franklin Field. The NASL folded in 1984, leaving the United States without a top-level soccer league until Major League Soccer (MLS) began play in 1996.

Philadelphia was one of eleven U.S. cities which hosted matches during the 2026 FIFA World Cup.

=== Tennis ===
Two teams named the Philadelphia Freedoms played in World TeamTennis, the original Philadelphia Freedoms, for which the Elton John song was written, and a second Philadelphia Freedoms team from 2001 until the league folded in 2021. Elton John and Freedoms star Billie Jean King were good friends, and John and his songwriting partner, Bernie Taupin, wrote the song for the team to be used as a team anthem at home matches in the Spectrum. John was such a big fan of the Freedoms that he attended home matches wearing the team's uniform and sat on the bench with the players. He recorded the song in the summer of 1974, and it was released on February 24, 1975.

WTT's inaugural season was 1974, and the Freedoms were one of the charter franchises. Teams had the opportunity to sign players to contracts prior to the draft held by the new 16-team league, and King signed with the Freedoms. She served as the team's player-coach, making her the first female head coach of a professional sports team that included male players, since WTT was a co-ed league. The Freedoms finished with WTT's best regular-season record at 39–5 in the league's inaugural season. King was the league's MVP. The Freedoms defeated the Cleveland Nets in the Eastern Division semifinals and the Pittsburgh Triangles in the Eastern Division championship series. Although King performed well in the WTT Finals, WTT Playoffs MVP Andrew Pattison was dominant for the Denver Racquets, and that proved too much to overcome, as the Freedoms were swept in two straight matches.

Following the 1974 season, WTT owners concluded it would be in all their interests to have a successful franchise in New York City, and they pressured Freedoms co-owner, Dick Butera, to trade King to the New York Sets, who were 15–29 in 1974, in a complicated deal on February 5, 1975. Upon announcing the trade, Butera said, "It's not an easy thing to let Billie Jean go. I feel like King Faisal giving away his oil wells."

After King was traded, a group of investors that included Bob Mades, Paul Slater, Herbert S. Hoffman, Robert K. Kraft and Harold Bayne expressed interest in buying the original Boston Lobsters. However, the Lobsters franchise had already been contracted by WTT. With Freedoms owners Dick and Ken Butera far less enthusiastic about their team after trading King, the two sides struck a deal, and the Freedoms were sold on March 27, 1975, and moved to Boston. In order to claim the name and intellectual property of the original Lobsters, the new ownership group was required to settle some of the debts of the former team. Once they accomplished this, the Freedoms were renamed as the Boston Lobsters. As a consequence, "Philadelphia Freedom" was never paid at a home match of the original Philadelphia Freedoms. King went on the win two WTT championships in New York in 1976 and 1977. The team changed its name to New York Apples after the 1976 season.

Billie Jean King and the Freedoms returned in 2001, when they became a WTT expansion franchise with King as their owner. The team first played its home matches at Cabrini College in Radnor Township and won WTT championships in 2001 (as an expansion team) and 2006. For the 2008 and 2009 seasons, home matches were played at a temporary stadium erected in the parking lot of the King of Prussia Mall. From 2010 to 2016, the Freedoms played their home matches at The Pavilion on the campus of Villanova University. In 2017, the Freedoms home court moved to Hagan Arena on the campus of Saint Joseph's University, returning to play within the city of Philadelphia for the first time since 1974. The franchise ended play in 2021 when World TeamTennis folded.

=== Timeline of franchises ===
The timeline includes Philadelphia franchises that played in major professional sports leagues after 1900.

Baseball Football Basketball Hockey Soccer

== Major professional championships, awards, and events ==
=== Major professional championships ===
Franchise	League	Championships
Philadelphia Eagles	NFL	1948, 1949, 1960, 2017, 2024
Frankford Yellow Jackets	NFL	1926
Philadelphia Phillies	MLB	1980, 2008
Philadelphia Athletics	MLB	1910, 1911, 1913, 1929, 1930
Hilldale Club	ECL	1925
Philadelphia 76ers	NBA	1967, 1983
Philadelphia Warriors	NBA	1947, 1956
Philadelphia Flyers	NHL	1974, 1975
Philadelphia Atoms	NASL	1973

==== Championship game/series appearances ====
Franchise	Season (Note: Includes conference championships and post-1900 MLB league pennants.)
Athletics	1905
Athletics	1910
Athletics	1911
Athletics	1913
Athletics	1914
Phillies	1915
Athletics	1929
Athletics	1930
Athletics	1931
Warriors	1946-47
Eagles	1947
Warriors	1947-48
Eagles	1948
Eagles	1949
Phillies	1950
Warriors	1955-56
Eagles	1960
Sixers	1966-67
Atoms	1973
Flyers	1973-74
Flyers	1974-75
Flyers	1975-76
Sixers	1976-77
Flyers	1979-80
Sixers	1979-80
Phillies	1980
Eagles	1980
Sixers	1981-82
Sixers	1982-83
Phillies	1983
Flyers	1984-85
Flyers	1986-87
Phillies	1993
Flyers	1996-97
Sixers	2000-01
Eagles	2004
Phillies	2008
Phillies	2009
Flyers	2009-10
Eagles	2017
Phillies	2022
Union	2022
Eagles	2022
Eagles	2024

=== Awards ===
==== MVPs ====
The following Philadelphia players won the regular season most valuable player award of the NFL (AP), MLB, NHL, NBA, or MLS. Note that MLB confers an MVP award to one player in the American League and one player in the National League.

- Eddie Collins, AL, 1914
- Mickey Cochrane, AL, 1928
- Lefty Grove, AL, 1931
- Chuck Klein, NL, 1932
- Jimmie Foxx, AL, 1932, 1933
- Jim Konstanty, NL, 1950
- Bobby Shantz, AL, 1952
- Norm Van Brocklin, NFL, 1960
- Wilt Chamberlain, NBA, 1959–60, 1965–66, 1966–67, 1967–68
- Bobby Clarke, NHL, 1972–73, 1974–75, 1975–76
- Mike Schmidt, NL, 1980, 1981, 1986
- Julius Erving, NBA, 1980–81
- Moses Malone, NBA, 1982–83
- Eric Lindros, NHL, 1994–95
- Allen Iverson, NBA, 2000–01
- Ryan Howard, NL, 2006
- Jimmy Rollins, NL, 2007
- Bryce Harper, NL, 2021
- Joel Embiid, NBA, 2022–23

==== Other awards ====
Player	League	Award	Year
Harry Byrd	AL	Rookie of the Year	1952
Jack Sanford	NL	Rookie of the Year	1957
Woody Sauldsberry	NBA	Rookie of the Year	1958
Buck Shaw	NFL	Coach of the Year	1960
Wilt Chamberlain	NBA	Rookie of the Year	1960
Dick Allen	NL	Rookie of the Year	1964
Dolph Schayes	NBA	Coach of the Year	1966
Steve Carlton	NL	Cy Young	1972
Fred Shero	NHL	Jack Adams Award	1974
Bernie Parent	NHL	Vezina Trophy	1974
Bernie Parent	NHL	Conn Smythe Trophy	1974
Bernie Parent	NHL	Vezina Trophy	1975
Bernie Parent	NHL	Conn Smythe Trophy	1975
Reggie Leach	NHL	Conn Smythe Trophy	1976
Steve Carlton	NL	Cy Young	1977
Pat Quinn	NHL	Jack Adams Award	1980
Steve Carlton	NL	Cy Young	1980
Manny Trillo	NL	NLCS MVP	1980
Mike Schmidt	NL	World Series MVP	1980
Steve Carlton	NL	Cy Young	1982
Bobby Clarke	NHL	Frank J. Selke Trophy	1983
Bobby Jones	NBA	Sixth Man of the Year	1983
Moses Malone	NBA	NBA Finals MVP	1983
John Denny	NL	Cy Young	1983
Gary Matthews	NL	NLCS MVP	1983
Mike Keenan	NHL	Jack Adams Award	1985
Pelle Lindbergh	NHL	Vezina Trophy	1985
Reggie White	NFL	Defensive Player of the Year	1987
Ron Hextall	NHL	Vezina Trophy	1987
Ron Hextall	NHL	Conn Smythe Trophy	1987
Dave Poulin	NHL	Frank J. Selke Trophy	1987
Steve Bedrosian	NL	Cy Young	1987
Curt Schilling	NL	NLCS MVP	1993
Ray Rhodes	NFL	Coach of the Year	1995
Dana Barros	NBA	Most Improved Player	1995
Allen Iverson	NBA	Rookie of the Year	1997
Scott Rolen	NL	Rookie of the Year	1997
Bill Barber	NHL	Jack Adams Award	2001
Aaron McKie	NBA	Sixth Man of the Year	2001
Dikembe Mutombo	NBA	Defensive Player of the Year	2001
Larry Brown	NBA	Coach of the Year	2001
Larry Bowa	NL	Manager of the Year	2001
Andy Reid	NFL	Coach of the Year	2002
Ryan Howard	NL	Rookie of the Year	2005
Ryan Howard	NL	Hank Aaron Award	2006
Brad Lidge	NL	Reliever of the Year	2008
Cole Hamels	NL	NLCS MVP	2008
Cole Hamels	NL	World Series MVP	2008
Ryan Howard	NL	NLCS MVP	2009
Roy Halladay	NL	Cy Young	2010
Michael Carter-Williams	NBA	Rookie of the Year	2014
Andre Blake	MLS	Goalkeeper of the Year	2016
Nick Foles	NFL	Super Bowl MVP	2017
Ben Simmons	NBA	Rookie of the Year	2018
Sean Couturier	NHL	Frank J. Selke Trophy	2020
Bryce Harper	NL	NLCS MVP	2022
Saquon Barkley	NFL	Offensive Player of the Year	2024
Jalen Hurts	NFL	Super Bowl MVP	2024

=== Major sports events held in Philadelphia ===
Philadelphia has hosted the following all-star games and drafts, including the first NFL draft:

- 1936 NFL draft
- 1942 NFL All-Star Game
- 1943 MLB All-Star Game
- 1944 NFL draft
- 1949 NFL draft
- 1950 NFL draft
- 1951 NFL draft
- 1952 NFL draft
- 1952 MLB All-Star Game
- 1953 NFL draft
- 1954 NFL draft
- 1955 NFL draft
- 1956 NFL draft
- 1957 NFL draft
- 1958 NFL draft
- 1959 NFL draft
- 1960 NFL draft
- 1960 NBA All-Star Game
- 1961 NFL draft
- 1970 NBA All-Star Game
- 1976 MLB All-Star Game
- 1976 NBA All-Star Game
- 1976 NHL All-Star Game
- 1992 NHL All-Star Game
- 1996 MLB All-Star Game
- 2002 NBA All-Star Game
- 2014 MLS SuperDraft
- 2014 NHL entry draft
- 2015 MLS SuperDraft
- 2017 NFL draft
- 2026 MLB All-Star Game

== Rivalries ==
Philadelphia has rivalries with three of the four other major cities in the Northeast megalopolis, particularly New York City along with a long instate rivalry with Pittsburgh. Philadelphia teams also compete with teams from New York City and Pittsburgh for fans support among New Jersey and Pennsylvania residents. In addition to regional rivalries, teams from Philadelphia have a number of other rivalries with teams from other cities.

=== New York City ===
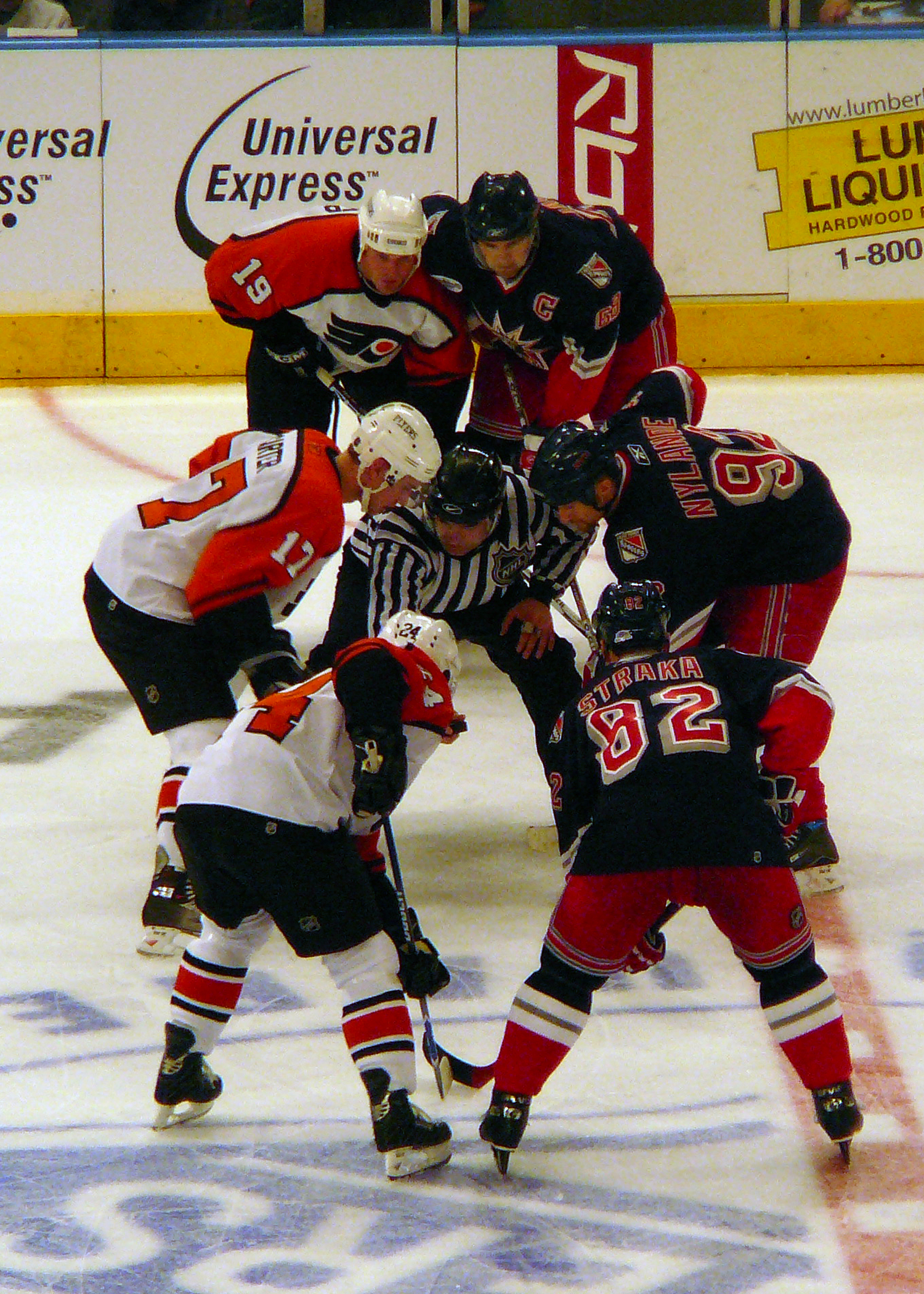
The Philadelphia Flyers and the New York Rangers at Madison Square Garden in New York City in January 2007

As the two largest cities in the United States for much of the nation's history, New York and Philadelphia have a historical rivalry that has continued in the world of sports. There are intra-division rivalries among teams from New York City and Philadelphia in each of the five major leagues, as seen in the rivalries between the New York Mets and the Philadelphia Phillies in the National League East, the New York Giants and the Philadelphia Eagles in the NFC East, the Brooklyn Nets and the Philadelphia 76ers, along with the New York Knicks and the Philadelphia 76ers in the NBA's Atlantic Division, the New York Rangers and the Philadelphia Flyers, along with the New York Islanders and the Philadelphia Flyers in the National Hockey League's Metropolitan Division, and the Philadelphia Union and the New York Red Bulls in Major League Soccer's Eastern Conference.

The Flyers also have an intense rivalry with the New Jersey Devils (who play in the New York metropolitan area). The Phillies and Yankees play each other very rarely, but the teams met in the 1950 World Series and the 2009 World Series. The New York Jets and the Eagles have only played each other thirteen times, with the Eagles winning 12 out of the 13 matchups.

=== Pittsburgh ===
Philadelphia and Pittsburgh are the two major cities of Pennsylvania and the only two cities in the state with major professional sports franchises, and the teams of the two cities have had strong rivalries in the NHL, MLB, and NFL. Perhaps the strongest current rivalry is between the Philadelphia Flyers and the Pittsburgh Penguins, both of which play in the Metropolitan Division of the NHL. The rivalry is generally considered to be one of the fiercest in the NHL.

Although not major rivals since the 1994 MLB divisional realignment, the Pittsburgh Pirates and Phillies had historically been heated rivals in the National League, and frequently competed for the National League East division title. The Phillies and Pirates still play regularly, but are no longer in the same division. The Pirates earned their name from a 19th-century incident with the Philadelphia Athletics; after the Pirates signed second baseman Lou Bierbauer, the Athletics protested that Pittsburgh's actions were "piratical."

The Pittsburgh Steelers and the Eagles both came into the NFL during the 1933 season. Between 1945 and 1970, the Eagles and Steelers played each other every year, and the two teams met in a one-game playoff in 1947. However, the Steelers moved to the American Football Conference as part of the 1970 AFL-NFL Merger, and the Eagles and Steelers only play each other every four years.

There is also a rivalry between Pittsburgh and Philadelphia at both the University of Pittsburgh and Penn State University, as there are many students from both cities at both state-related schools.

=== Boston ===
Philadelphia and Boston have historically had strong rivalries in the NBA and NHL. The 76ers have a long rivalry with the Boston Celtics and both currently compete in the Atlantic Division. The two franchises have met each other in the NBA playoffs more than any other pair of franchises. Sixers guard Andrew Toney earned the appellation "The Boston Strangler" for his clutch play against the Boston Celtics in the 1980s. The Flyers have met the Boston Bruins seven times in the NHL playoffs, including a stretch where they met four out of five years, one of those meetings being the 1974 Stanley Cup Finals. The Philadelphia Phillies and the Boston Red Sox are interleague rivals, and the two franchises met in the 1915 World Series. The Eagles and the New England Patriots rarely play, but the teams met in both Super Bowl XXXIX and Super Bowl LII. The Union and the New England Revolution both play in the MLS's Eastern Conference.

=== Washington, D.C. ===
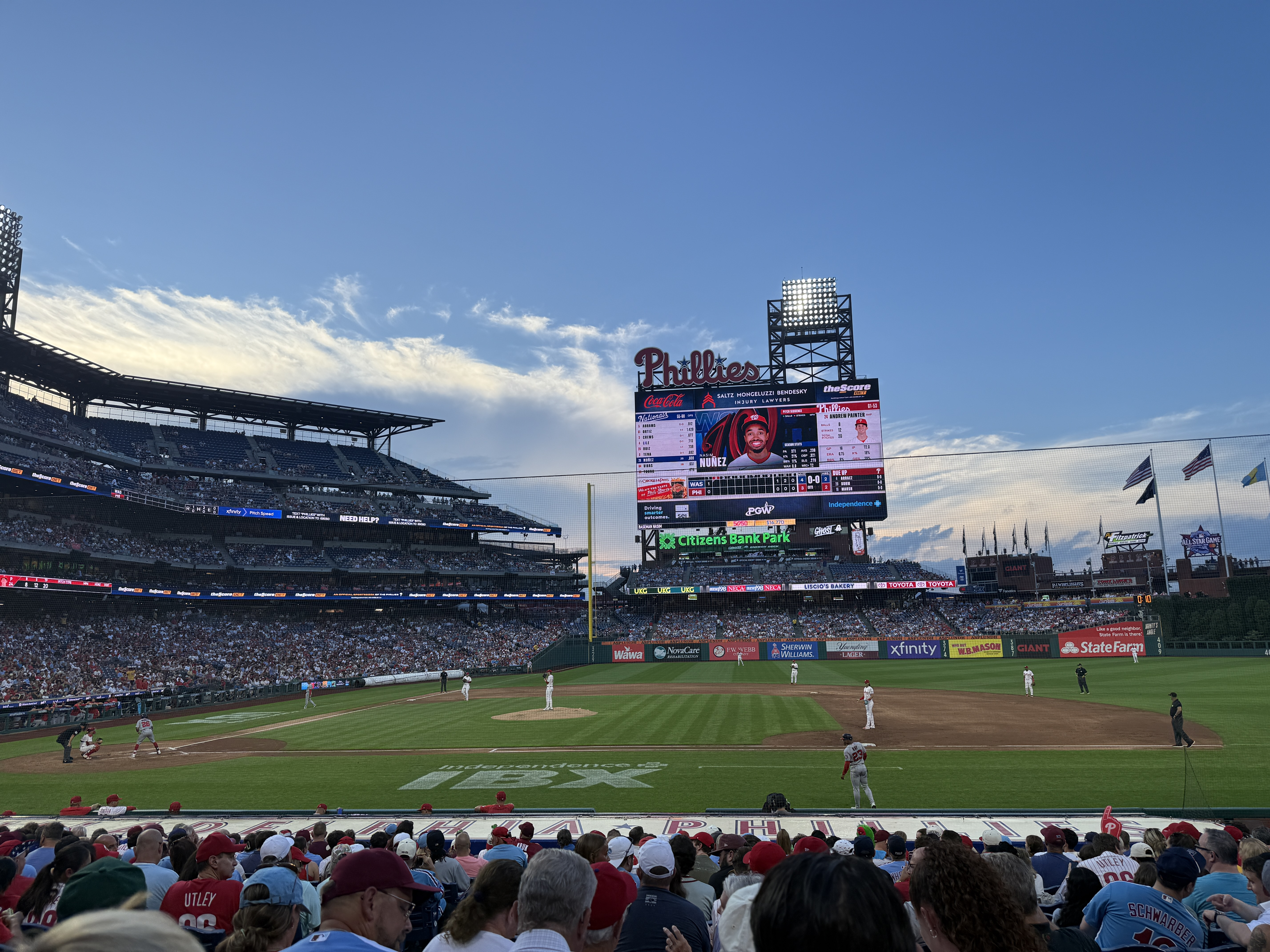
The Philadelphia Phillies playing the Washington Nationals at Citizens Bank Park in August 2026

Philadelphia and Washington, D.C. have teams in the same division in the NFL, NHL, MLB, and MLS. The Eagles and the Washington Commanders have a long history, having (almost always) competed in the same division since 1933. The Flyers and the Washington Capitals both play in the Metropolitan Division; the rivals have met five times in the NHL playoffs. The Washington Nationals franchise (including their predecessor, the Montreal Expos) and the Phillies have competed in the NL East since 1969. The Union have developed an intraconference rivalry with D.C. United. The Washington Wizards and the 76ers also both play in the NBA's Eastern Conference, and the two teams met in the NBA playoffs five times, most recently in 2021. They also met in the 1971 playoffs, when the current Washington franchise was based in Baltimore.

=== Other rivalries ===
Philadelphia teams have rivalries with teams from outside of the Northeast. There is a passionate NFC East rivalry between the Eagles and the Cowboys, with a number of stories and memorable events surrounding the rivalry. There was also a rivalry (stemming from the NFL) between the Soul and the Dallas Desperados. The 76ers enjoy an interconference rivalry with the Los Angeles Lakers. The two teams met in the NBA Finals in 1980, 1982, 1983, and 2001. The Phillies have developed a rivalry with the Atlanta Braves. The teams met in the 1993 NLCS, and the two franchises are the most frequent winners of the NL East.

== Other professional teams ==
Club	League	Division	Venue	Location	Founded	Titles
Philadelphia Waterdogs	PLL	Eastern	Subaru Park and Villanova Stadium	Chester and Villanova	2024	1 (Note: The Waterdogs won the 2022 PLL championship, prior to being affiliated with Philadelphia.)
Delaware Blue Coats	G League	Atlantic	Chase Fieldhouse	Wilmington, Delaware	2018	1
Philadelphia Union II	MLS Next Pro	Northeast	Subaru Park	Chester, Pennsylvania	2015	0
Philadelphia Phoenix	UFA	East	Neumann University	Aston, PA	2013	0
The Philadelphians	MiLC	East	Clemens Park	Hatfield, PA	2020	0
Philadelphia Surge	PUL	East	Vidas Field at Drexel University	Philadelphia	2023	0

=== American football ===
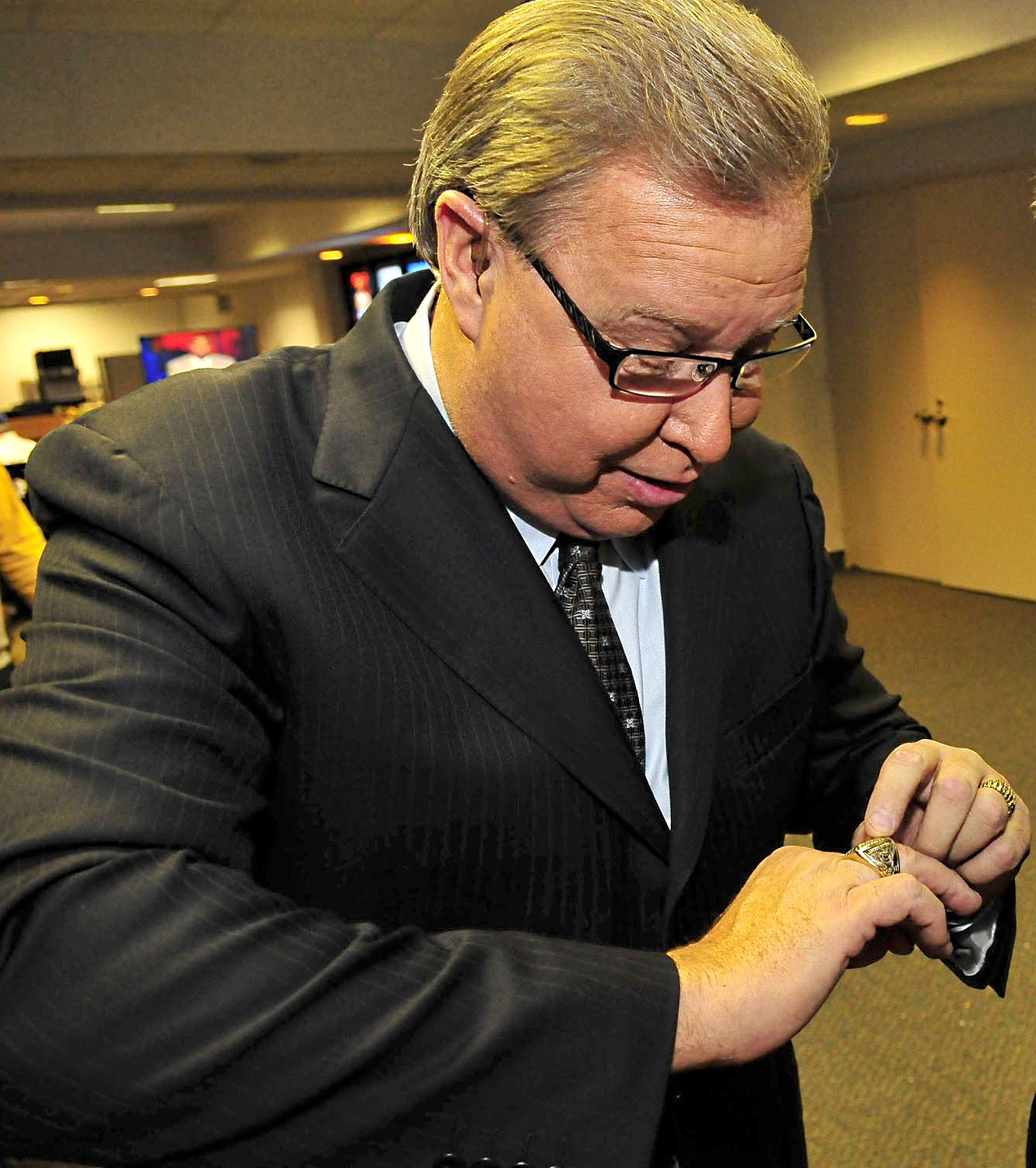
Ron Jaworski, former Eagles quarterback and former owner of the Soul

The Philadelphia Soul were an Arena Football League (AFL) franchise founded in 2004, playing their games in the Wells Fargo Center. Ron Jaworski, a former Philadelphia Eagles quarterback who led the team to an appearance in Super Bowl XV in 1981, served as president and a co-owner of the team. The Soul won ArenaBowl XXII in 2008 before the league formally disbanded in 2009. The Soul returned in 2010 after the AFL restarted its operations as a new entity, where they won back-to-back championships in 2017 (ArenaBowl XXIX) and 2018 (ArenaBowl XXX), before disbanding in 2019 when the AFL folded again. In 2024, the Soul briefly returned under new ownership.

Philadelphia has hosted several women's American football teams as well. The city's first women's tackle football team was the Philadelphia Liberty Belles, which played in the National Women's Football Association and the Independent Women's Football League from 2001 to 2004. A second incarnation of the Liberty Belles was founded in 2009, and plays in the Women's Football Alliance. The Philadelphia Firebirds, established in 2003, play in the Independent Women's Football League. The Philadelphia Passion played in the Legends Football League.

Other football teams in the city have folded. In 1902 the owners of the three MLB teams in Pennsylvania founded the National Football League (a league unrelated to the modern NFL). The league consisted of the Phillies, Athletics, and the Pittsburgh Stars, and lasted only one year. Many of the players from the Philadelphia teams played for the "New York Philadelphians" during the 1902 World Series of Football. Other early football clubs include the Union Club of Phoenixville, Conshohocken Athletic Club, Union Quakers of Philadelphia, and Holmesburg Athletic Club. The Clifton Heights Orange & Black competed from 1921 to 1932, and played in the short-lived Eastern League of Professional Football. The Philadelphia Bulldogs played in the Continental Football League from 1965 to 1966. They won the 1966 championship. The Pottstown Firebirds competed in the Atlantic Coast Football League from 1968 to 1970, where they served as an affiliate of the Philadelphia Eagles. They won the ACFL championship in 1969 and 1970.

=== Baseball ===
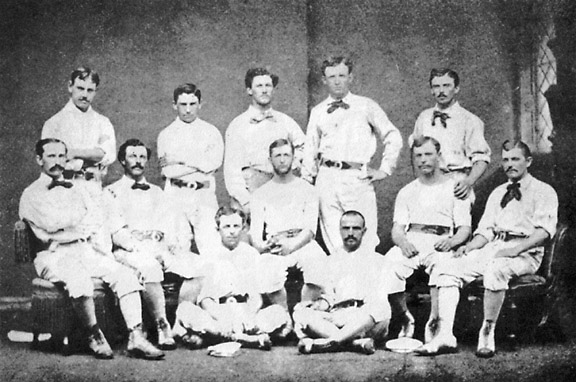
The Philadelphia Athletics, formed in 1860, were the first major league baseball team in Philadelphia

Although the Philadelphia Phillies are the only active major league professional baseball team in Philadelphia, other professional baseball teams play in the Greater Philadelphia area. The Reading Fightin Phils are the Double-A affiliate of the Philadelphia Phillies. The club was established in 1967 and play in the Eastern League. Notable alumni of the Fightin Phils include Mike Schmidt, Ryne Sandberg, and Jimmy Rollins. High-A teams in the area include the Jersey Shore BlueClaws, a Phillies affiliate that plays in Lakewood Township, New Jersey, and the Wilmington Blue Rocks, a Washington Nationals affiliate that plays in Wilmington, Delaware.

During the 19th century, Philadelphia was home to numerous franchises that played in various leagues that did not last into the 20th century. Many of these leagues are considered to be "major leagues" by baseball historians and record keepers. Three different franchises, none directly related to each other or the current Athletics franchise, played in Philadelphia during the 19th century. The original Philadelphia Athletics (also known as Athletic Base Ball Club of Philadelphia) were formed in 1860, and played in the National Association and the National League. Another Athletics franchise played in the American Association from 1882 to 1890, while a third Athletics franchise (also known as the Quakers) played one season in the Players' League and one season in the American Association. The Philadelphia White Stockings and the Philadelphia Centennials played in the National Association during the 1870s. Joe Borden of the White Stockings pitched the first no-hitter in professional history. The Philadelphia Keystones and the Wilmington Quicksteps both played parts of the Union Association's lone season in 1884.

=== Basketball ===
The Delaware Blue Coats are the NBA G League affiliate of the Philadelphia 76ers. Since the 2018–19 season, the franchise has played at the Chase Fieldhouse in Wilmington, Delaware. The Blue Coats franchise is named in honor of the 198th Signal Battalion, which fought in the American Revolutionary War for Delaware. The Blue Coats were founded as the Utah Flash in 2007, but the Flash suspended operations in 2011. The Sixers acquired the franchise in 2013 and renamed it as the Delaware 87ers, playing in Newark. The team assumed its current name upon its move to Wilmington. NBA players such as Kendall Marshall, Sean Kilpatrick, and Jordan McRae have played for the Blue Coats or the 87ers.

The Philadelphia area had three teams that played in the American Basketball League, a product of an early attempt at forming a top-level national professional basketball league. The Philadelphia Warriors played in the ABL in the 1920s. The Philadelphia Sphas played from 1917 to 1949, winning seven ABL championships. With the rise of the NBA, the ABL ceased to be a major league, and the Sphas became the touring opponent of the Harlem Globetrotters. The Sphas were renamed the Washington Generals in 1952. Wilmington also had a team in the ABL: the Wilmington Bombers played in the league in the 1940s.

The Philadelphia area has hosted numerous other defunct basketball teams. Two franchises named the Bullets played in Camden and Cherry Hill in the 1960s and 1970s. The Philadelphia Kings played in the Continental Basketball Association in the league's 1980–1981 season. The Philadelphia Aces played in the United States Basketball League from 1987 to 1990. The Philadelphia Spirit played in the United States Basketball League from 1991 to 1992. The Philadelphia Rage moved from Richmond, Virginia in 1997, and played a year and a half in the American Basketball League before the league folded during the 1998 season. The Philadelphia Fusion, formerly the Jersey Squires, was an American Basketball Association team that folded in February 2005.

=== Esports ===
In 2017, Blizzard Entertainment announced their professional esports league for their game Overwatch, the Overwatch League (OWL). Philadelphia was home to one of the league's teams, the Philadelphia Fusion. The Overwatch League differs from traditional esports, with a set of permanent teams and regular season play, compared to the use of promotion and relegation commonly used in other esports leagues. The Fusion moved to South Korea and rebranded as the Seoul Infernal in December 2022.

=== Ice hockey ===
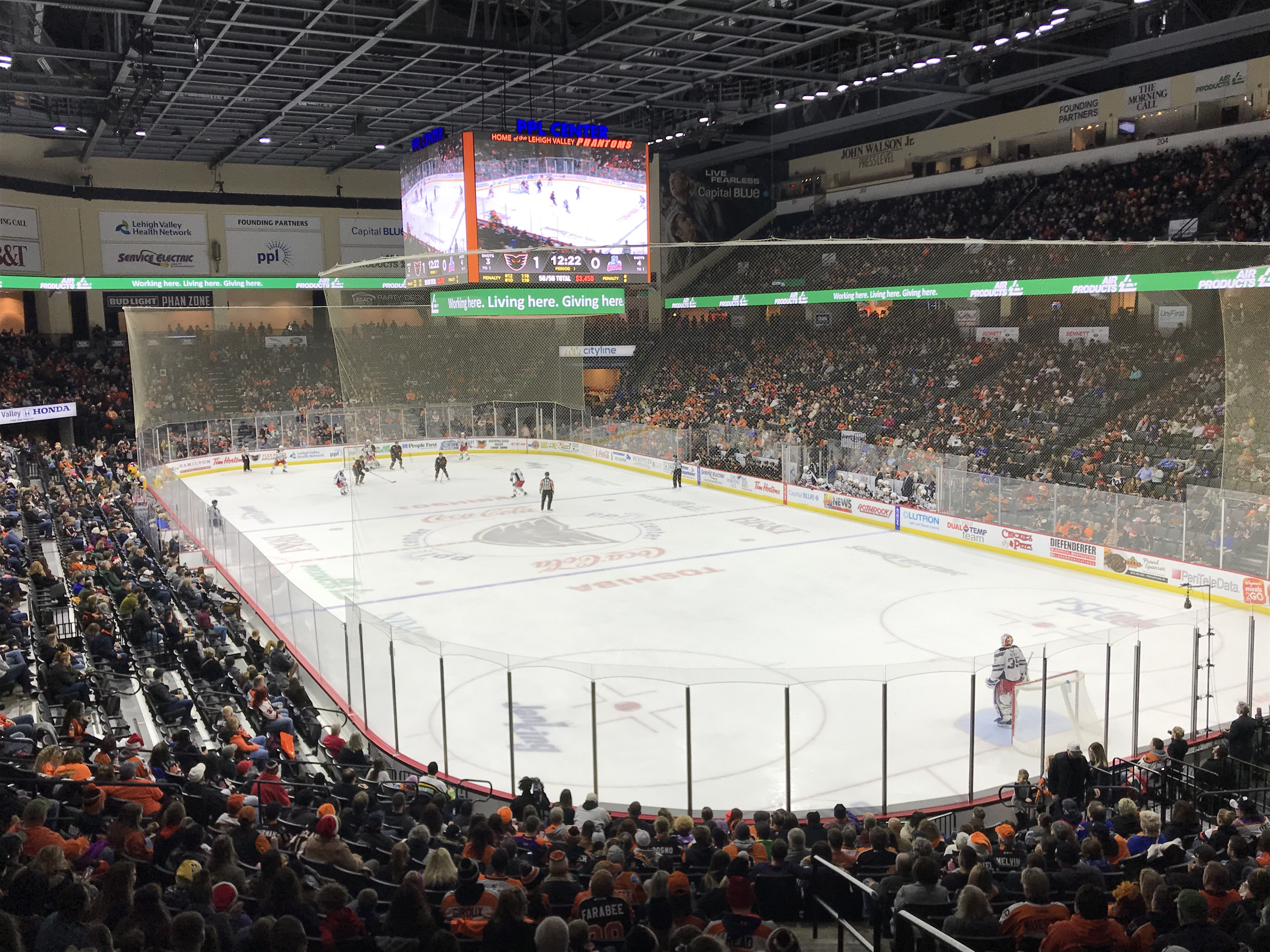
Lehigh Valley Phantoms, the primary development team of the Philadelphia Flyers, playing at PPL Center in Allentown in December 2019

Both of the Flyers' minor league affiliates play or have formerly played in the Philadelphia area. The Lehigh Valley Phantoms of the American Hockey League (AHL) are the top minor league affiliate of the Flyers. The Phantoms have played in Allentown, Pennsylvania, since 2014, but from 1996 to 2009, the Phantoms played in the Spectrum and were known as the Philadelphia Phantoms. During this era, the franchise won the Calder Cup in 1998 and 2005. The Reading Royals are the ECHL affiliate of the Philadelphia Flyers. The franchise was founded in 1991 as the Columbus Chill, but moved to Reading in 2001. The Royals won the Kelly Cup for the first time in 2013.

Philadelphia has had several minor league hockey teams play in the city and the surrounding area. The Philadelphia Arrows were the first hockey franchise in city history, playing in the Canadian–American Hockey League from 1927 to 1935. The franchise changed its name to the Philadelphia Ramblers before the 1935–36 season and joined the American Hockey League, where they won the 1936 league championship (the year before the league introduced the Calder Cup). The team acted as the primary affiliate of the New York Rangers from 1935 to 1941. The Philadelphia Falcons played in the Eastern Hockey League (EHL) from 1942 to 1946, before jumping to the American Hockey League and playing as the Philadelphia Rockets from 1946 to 1949. Another franchise named the Ramblers played in the EHL from 1955 to 1964; the Ramblers moved to Cherry Hill, New Jersey and played as the Jersey Devils from 1964 to 1973. A previous EHL Cherry Hill team named the Jersey Larks had played one season in 1960–61. The Philadelphia Firebirds were a minor league hockey team that played in the Philadelphia Civic Center from 1974 to 1979. They played in the North American Hockey League (NAHL) from 1974 to 1977, winning the league championship in 1976. When the NAHL folded in 1977, they joined the AHL. The team moved to Syracuse, New York in 1979, but folded in 1980. Another short-lived team that played in the Centrum (the renamed Cherry Hill Arena) was the Jersey Aces, which started the 1979–80 Northeastern Hockey League season in Cherry Hill but moved mid-season, playing the final 18 games of its season in Hampton, Virginia, where it continued operating until 1981. In 2017, and starting again in 2022, the Philadelphia Rebels play NAHL tier-2 junior ice hockey.

=== Lacrosse ===
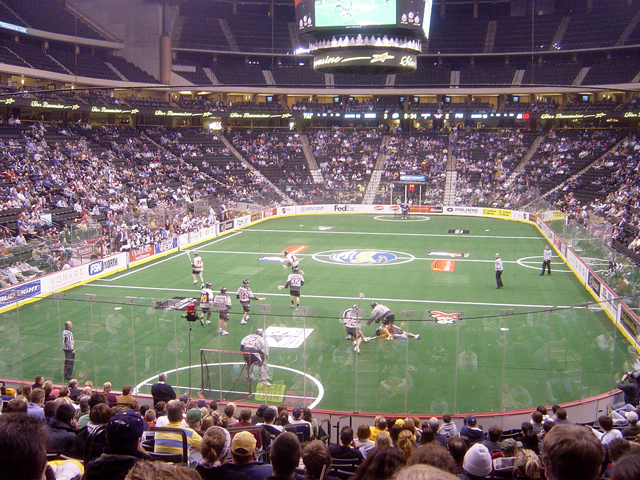
The Philadelphia Wings versus the Minnesota Swarm. The Wings relocated from Philadelphia in 2014 to become the New England Black Wolves.

Philadelphia has hosted several professional lacrosse teams. The first professional lacrosse team was the Philadelphia Wings, founded in 1974, along with the launch of the National Lacrosse League. This team, along with the league as a whole, only lasted one season before disbanding in 1975. In 1987, the Eagle Pro Box Lacrosse League (now the National Lacrosse League (NLL)) was created, with a new Philadelphia Wings franchise being founded. The Wings won the league title six times, in 1989, 1990, 1994, 1995, 1998, and 2001. They were the longest tenured team in one location in the NLL, but relocated after the 2014 season to become the New England Black Wolves. In 2018, the Wings returned as an expansion franchise, playing for an additional eight seasons in the NLL before folding in 2026.

Another lacrosse franchise, the Philadelphia Barrage, played in Major League Lacrosse (MLL) from 2004 to 2008. The team won the league championship in three out of the five years they played in Philadelphia, but the franchise folded after the 2008 season. The Barrage were resurrected for the 2020 season, but MLL was merged into the Premier Lacrosse League at the end of the season and the Barrage were not included as a team in the merged league. The PLL uses a tour-based model unique in North American professional sports, in which each round of matches is played at a separate location. In the 2022 season, Subaru Park hosted the PLL championship game. In 2023, the PLL shifted to a new model in which touring would continue, but teams would also be affiliated with specific cities. The Philadelphia Waterdogs were announced as the team representing Philadelphia.

=== Soccer ===
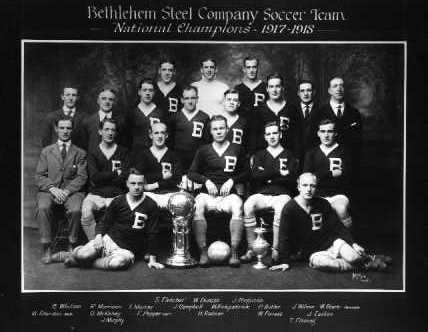
The 1917–18 Bethlehem Steel F.C., winner of the Lamar Hunt U.S. Open Cup

Philadelphia has been the home of numerous defunct professional soccer teams. The Philadelphia Phillies and other baseball clubs established the American League of Professional Football, the first professional soccer league in the United States. The league only played for one season in 1894. Arthur Irwin, the manager of the Phillies baseball team, served as the league president. Other early Philadelphia-area soccer clubs include Philadelphia Hibernian, Centennial F.C., Philadelphia Merchant Ship, Disston A.A., Victor F.C.

Numerous teams competed in the defunct second American Soccer League, including the Philadelphia Ukrainians, Uhrik Truckers, Philadelphia Nationals and the Philadelphia Spartans. The Philadelphia Ukrainians won the US Open Cup four times, while the Uhrik Truckers won the trophy once. Walter Bahr, a Philadelphia native and the captain of the 1950 U.S. national team that defeated England, played for the Ukrainians and the Nationals. The Philadelphia Fever were an indoor team that played in the original Major Indoor Soccer League from 1978 to 1982. The Philadelphia KiXX were an indoor team that played from 1995 to 2010 in the National Indoor Soccer League and the Major Indoor Soccer League. The KiXX won the championship in 2002 and 2007, but disbanded in 2010. Philadelphia has also been home to defunct women's soccer teams.

Philadelphia has two defunct women's teams that played at the top level of the United States soccer pyramid. The Philadelphia Charge played in the Women's United Soccer Association from 2000 to 2003, while the Philadelphia Independence played the 2010 and 2011 seasons in Women's Professional Soccer, reaching (and losing in) the championship game each year before the league folded in 2012. Philadelphia has not yet had a team play in the National Women's Soccer League, which is currently the top women's league in the United States. However, the current NWSL side NJ/NY Gotham FC, normally based at Red Bull Arena in New York City's New Jersey suburbs, played one home game at Subaru Park in both 2021 and 2022. Presumably, this arrangement was intended to develop a fanbase in southern New Jersey.

=== Other sports ===
Philadelphia has two professional ultimate frisbee teams. The Philadelphia Phoenix is the men's team, which was founded in 2013. The team played at the South Philadelphia Super Site until 2024 when their home field moved to Neumann University. The Philadelphia Surge was founded in 2023 and plays at the South Philadelphia Super Site.

The Philadelphia metropolitan area hosts a Twenty20 cricket team known as the Philadelphians, which compete in Minor League Cricket. Founded in 2020, the team takes its name from the historical Philadelphian cricket team from 1878 to 1913.

== Collegiate sports ==
The city of Philadelphia is the home of nine National Collegiate Athletic Association (NCAA) schools. Drexel University, La Salle University, the University of Pennsylvania, Saint Joseph's University, and Temple University are NCAA Division I schools. Chestnut Hill College, Holy Family University, and Thomas Jefferson University are NCAA Division II. Other NCAA schools in the metropolitan area include Division I schools Delaware State University, the University of Delaware, and Villanova University.

The following table shows all NCAA Division I schools in the Delaware Valley and all NCAA schools in Philadelphia.

School	Team	Est.	Type	Location	Varsity Sports	Division	Conference	Football
Chestnut Hill College	Griffins	1924	Catholic	Chestnut Hill	16	II	Central Atlantic	No
University of Delaware	Fightin' Blue Hens	1743	Public	Newark	20	I	C-USA	FBS
Delaware State University	Hornets	1891	Public	Dover	16	I	MEAC	FCS
Drexel University	Dragons	1891	Private	University City	18	I	CAA	No
Holy Family University	Tigers	1954	Catholic	Torresdale	15	II	Central Atlantic	No
Thomas Jefferson University (Jefferson)	Rams	1884	Private	East Falls	16	II	Central Atlantic	No
La Salle University	Explorers	1863	Catholic	Logan	23	I	Atlantic 10	No
University of Pennsylvania	Quakers	1740	Private	University City	27	I	Ivy League	FCS
Princeton University	Tigers	1746	Private	Princeton	12	I	Ivy League	FCS
Saint Joseph's University	Hawks	1851	Catholic	Wynnefield	20	I	Atlantic 10	No
Temple University	Owls	1884	Public	North Philadelphia	19	I	The American	FBS
Villanova University	Wildcats	1842	Catholic	Villanova	24	I	Big East (Note: CAA Football is administered by, but separate from, the multi-sports Coastal Athletic Association.)	FCS (CAA Football)

=== American football ===
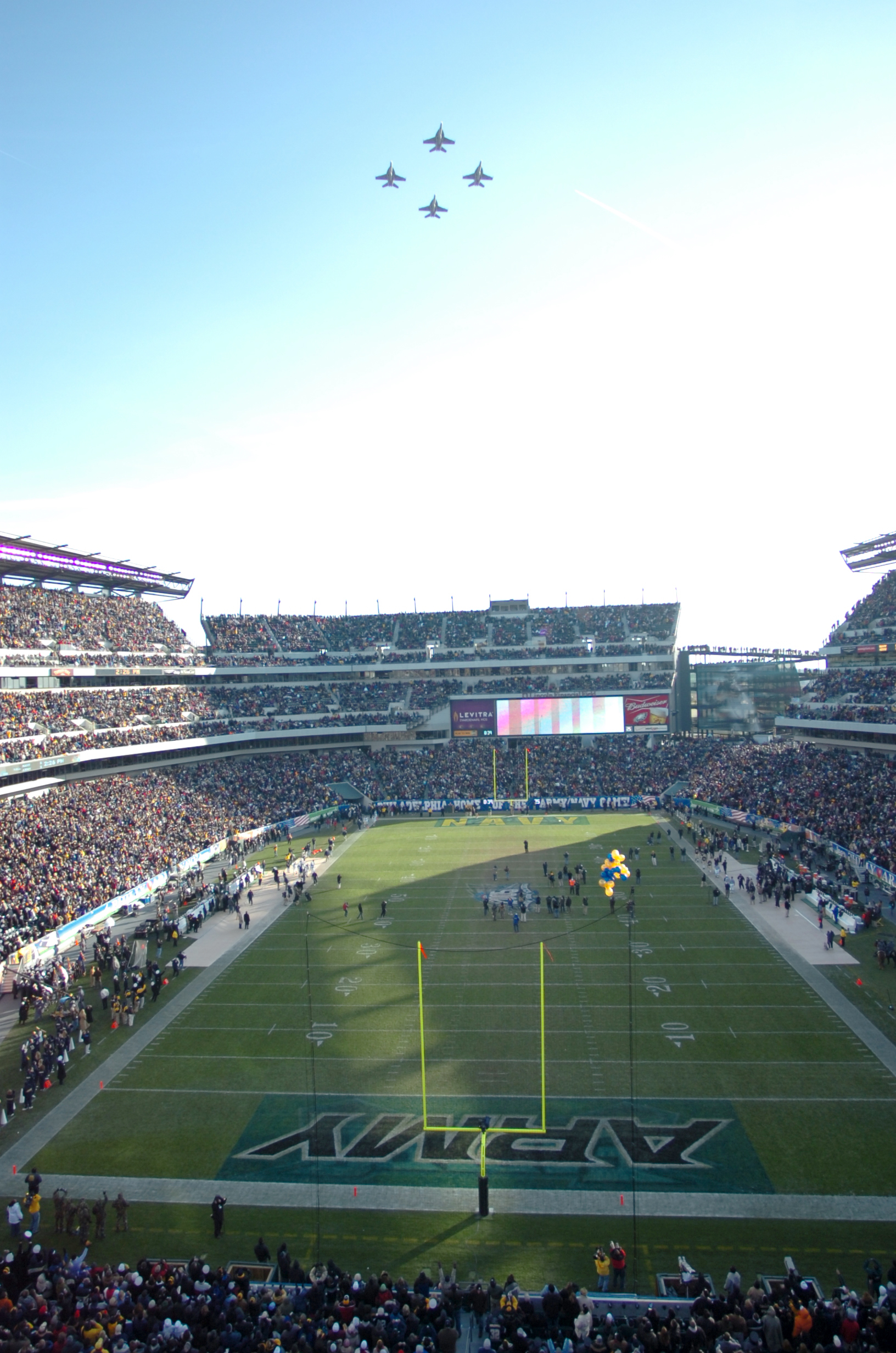
The 2005 Army–Navy football game, played at Lincoln Financial Field; Philadelphia has hosted the annual game more often than any other city.

The Philadelphia area is home to two NCAA Division I Football Bowl Subdivision (FBS) programs. The Temple Owls originally began play in 1894 and today participate in the American Conference. The Owls play their home games at Lincoln Financial Field in South Philadelphia. The Delaware Fightin' Blue Hens, who began play in 1889, participate in Conference USA, having recently moved to the FBS level in 2025. Delaware won the NCAA Division I-AA (now FCS) championship in 2003.

Although Temple and Delaware are the only FBS schools in the area, the Penn State Nittany Lions of Pennsylvania State University are the most popular college football team in Philadelphia and the Delaware Valley, with a significant alumni base residing throughout the region. Penn State is a member of the Big Ten, one of the "power conferences" in college football. The school's football program began play in 1887, and has won two consensus national championships. Many fans in the Philadelphia area also root for the Notre Dame Fighting Irish of the University of Notre Dame, mainly due to the area's large Catholic population.

NCAA Division I Football Championship Subdivision (FCS) programs in the region include the Penn Quakers, Delaware State Hornets, and Villanova Wildcats. Penn's football program is one of the oldest in the nation, first beginning play in 1876. Their home stadium, Franklin Field in West Philadelphia, was first constructed in 1895, making it the oldest active stadium in all of college football. Penn plays in the Ivy League, and holds a claim to six national championships. Villanova is a member of the Patriot League and began play in 1894. They won the FCS championship in 2009. Delaware State first began play in 1924 and participates in the Mid-Eastern Athletic Conference. As an HBCU school, Delaware State competes for the Black college football national championship, claiming the title in 2007.

Delaware and Villanova have played each other every year since 1988 in the Battle of the Blue, while Delaware and Delaware State have played every year since 2011 in the Route 1 Rivalry.

Several other Philadelphia-area schools formerly hosted football programs, but have since discontinued them. Saint Joseph's University held a program until the sport of football was dropped in 1939. The Drexel Dragons operated a team from 1892 to 1973. Most recently, the La Salle Explorers operated from 1931 to 2007.

The Army–Navy Game, an annual college football game between the rival service academies (the United States Military Academy and the United States Naval Academy), has been held in Philadelphia more often than any other location since the game was first played in 1890. Philadelphia has consistently been chosen as the location of the game due to its location as a rough midpoint between the two academies, with the U.S. Military Academy located in West Point, New York, and the U.S. Naval Academy located in Annapolis, Maryland.

Philadelphia also formerly host an annual bowl game. From 1959 to 1963, the city hosted the Liberty Bowl, the only cold-weather bowl game of its time. In 1965, the game moved to its present-day location of Memphis, Tennessee.

=== Men's basketball ===
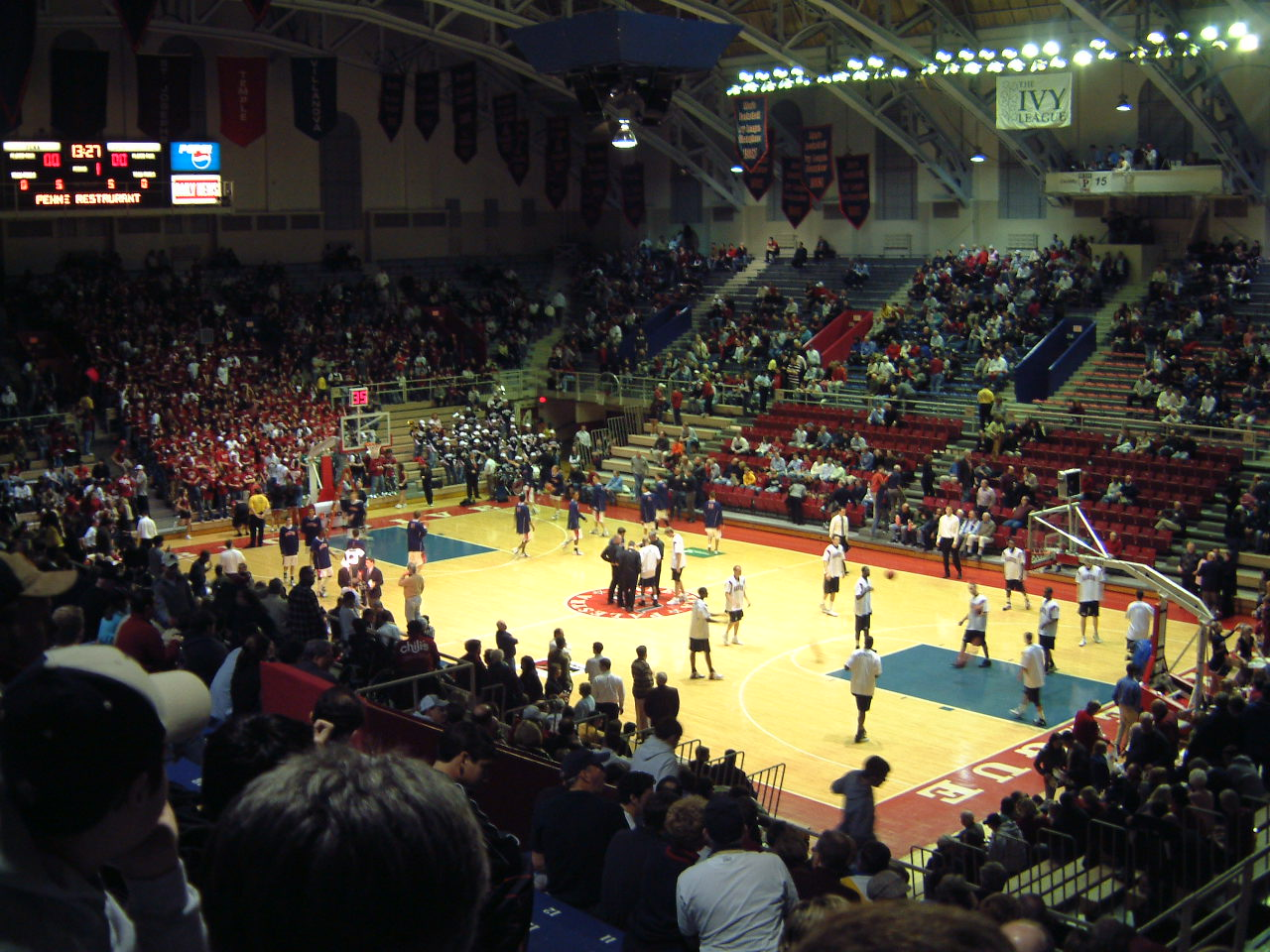
College basketball at the University of Pennsylvania's Palestra; The Palestra formerly hosted many Big 5 games, an intense college basketball rivalry among the Philadelphia area's five major NCAA Division I teams.

Philadelphia enjoys a unique inner-city basketball rivalry with the Big 5, a group that historically consisted of five local NCAA Division I men's basketball programs: Temple, Saint Joseph's, Penn, Villanova, and La Salle. A sixth local program, Drexel, was officially added to the rivalry in 2023. The close proximity of each of the schools, along with the significant history and legacy in each of the programs, has made the Big 5 rivalry intense. From 1956 to 2022, the schools played each other annually in a round-robin format to determine the champion of the city series. The Palestra, Penn's home gymnasium in the University City neighborhood of Philadelphia, is regarded as a storied site throughout all of college basketball, bearing the nickname of "The Cathedral of College Basketball". For many years, all Big 5 games between these teams took place at the Palestra. Since 2023, the schools compete in the Big 5 Classic, a mix of round-robin games and a single-day tripleheader tournament that takes place at Xfinity Mobile Arena.

Each of the original Big 5 programs have made at least one appearance in the NCAA tournament Final Four, and two have won national titles—La Salle in 1954 and Villanova in 1985, 2016, and 2018. Temple, Penn and Villanova all rank among the top 50 Division I teams in number of games won. Three Big 5 players have won the Naismith College Player of the Year award: Lionel Simmons of La Salle in 1990, Jameer Nelson of Saint Joseph's in 2004, and Jalen Brunson of Villanova in 2018. Drexel competes in the Coastal Athletic Association (CAA), while La Salle and Saint Joseph's compete in the Atlantic 10 Conference (A-10). Penn and Villanova are perennial powers in the Ivy League and the Big East Conference, respectively. Temple joined the American Conference since 2013. Prior to then, Temple had also been a member of the Atlantic 10, and it still holds record for the most A-10 basketball tournament championships.

Prior to Drexel joining the Big 5 rivalry in 2023, they made up the City 6 in extramural competition with the Big 5 schools. Drexel has its own basketball rivalry with Penn, known as the Battle of 33rd Street. This rivalry is geographically the closest in NCAA Division I, as the two schools' campuses adjoin one another in the University City neighborhood of Philadelphia, and their basketball arenas are just three blocks apart. Another significant rivalry within the Big 5 is the "Holy War" contested between Saint Joseph's and Villanova, as both are Catholic universities.

Other NCAA Division I men's basketball programs in the area include Delaware, which has made five NCAA tournament appearances, most recently reaching the second round in 2014. Delaware State has reached the NCAA tournament once, losing in the first round in 2005. Delaware plays alongside Drexel in the CAA, while Delaware State plays in the Mid-Eastern Athletic Conference (MEAC). Three Philadelphia schools field Division II men's basketball programs: Chestnut Hill College, Holy Family University, and Thomas Jefferson University. The University of the Sciences also fielded a Division II team before it merged into Saint Joseph's University in 2022.

In 1939, Philadelphia hosted the first game of the first NCAA tournament. The Spectrum in Philadelphia hosted the NCAA tournament Final Four in 1976 and 1981, and the current Xfinity Mobile Arena has been a recurring host of NCAA tournament games for earlier rounds.

=== Women's basketball ===
Women's basketball is another popular college sport in Philadelphia. Saint Joseph's, Villanova, and Temple have all appeared at least ten times in the NCAA tournament, while La Salle, Penn, Drexel, Delaware, and Delaware State have all appeared in at least one tournament. Villanova has advanced further than any other area school, making the Elite Eight in 2003. The six Big 5 schools also participate in a women Big 5 rivalry, and the women's Big 5 Classic takes place annually at the Finneran Pavilion on the campus of Villanova University.

Perhaps the most well-known women's college basketball story from the Philadelphia area comes from Immaculata University. Immaculata, a small Catholic school in East Whiteland Township, Pennsylvania, rose to national prominence in the 1970s when head coach Cathy Rush led the team to victory in the first three AIAW women's basketball tournaments from 1972 to 1974. In 2009, The Mighty Macs, a film about the Immaculata team, was released. The three championship teams were collectively inducted into the Basketball Hall of Fame in 2014. One of the players on the Immaculata team, Theresa Grentz, served as head coach of the United States women's national basketball team.

=== Rowing ===
Rowing has been popular in Philadelphia since the 18th century. Boathouse Row, a site along the Schuylkill River in Philadelphia, is a symbol of the city's rich rowing history. Drexel, La Salle, Penn, Saint Joseph's, Temple, and Villanova each have their own boathouse at the site for their rowing teams. Philadelphia hosts numerous local and collegiate rowing clubs and competitions, including the annual Dad Vail Regatta, the largest intercollegiate rowing event in the U.S., the Stotesbury Cup Regatta, and the Head of the Schuylkill Regatta, all of which are held on the Schuylkill River. The regattas are hosted and organized by the Schuylkill Navy, an association of area rowing clubs that has produced numerous Olympic rowers.

=== Rugby ===
Philadelphia has several rugby teams in professional leagues. The Philadelphia Whitemarsh RFC, a rugby union team, was founded in 1985, the Philadelphia Fight, a semi-professional rugby league football team, was founded in 1998, and the Northeast Philadelphia Irish, a team within the Eastern Pennsylvania Rugby Union, was founded in 2011 and has both men and women clubs.

Colleges in the area also offer club rugby teams, with most area teams competing as part of the Eastern Pennsylvania Rugby Union. The Collegiate Rugby Championship (CRC), is a college rugby sevens tournament held every June at Subaru Park near Philadelphia. The CRC is the highest profile college rugby competition in the United States, with the tournament broadcast live on NBC every year. The Collegiate Rugby Championship has succeeded in drawing media attention, corporate sponsorships and attendance.

=== Other sports ===
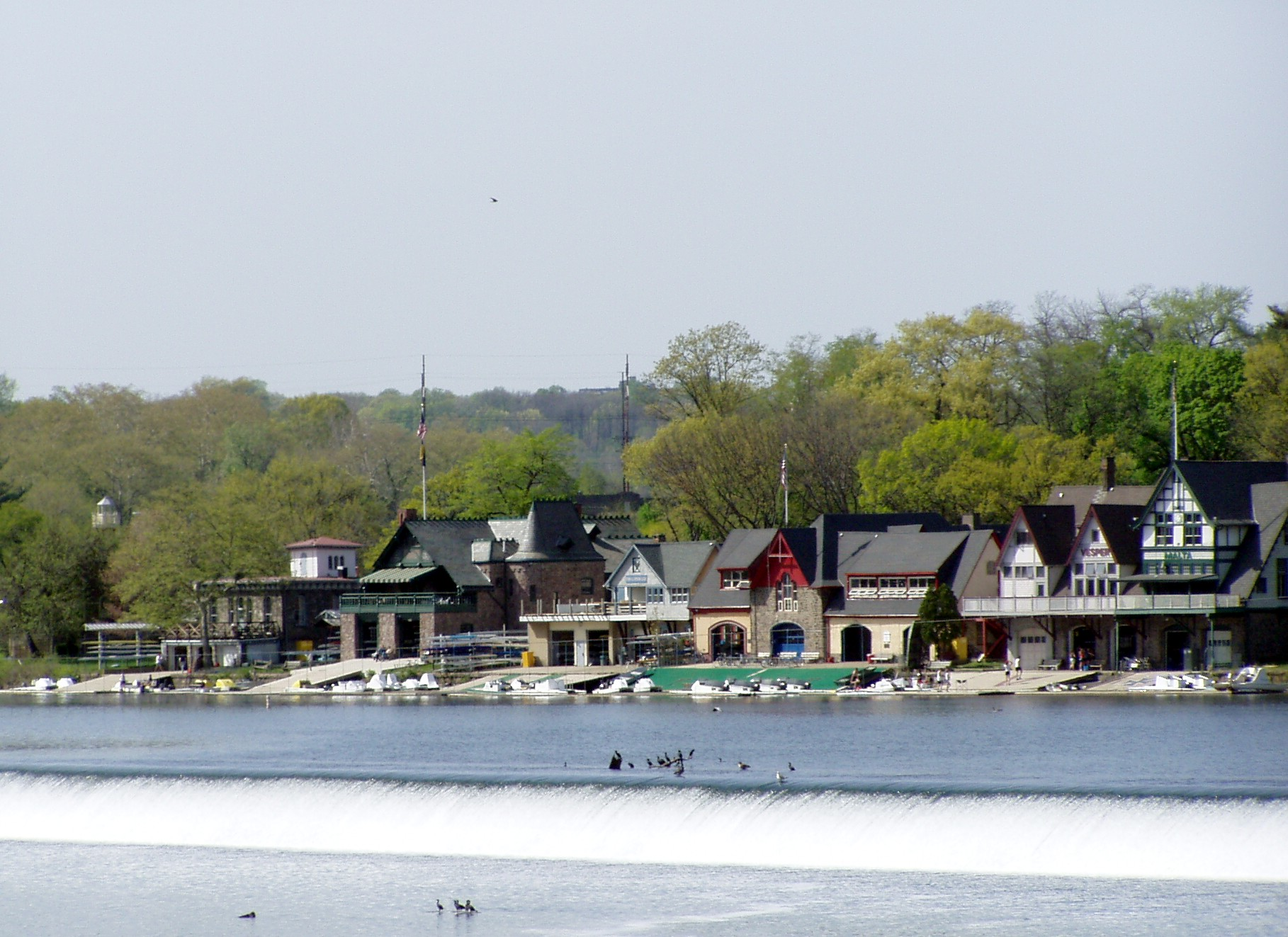
Boathouse Row on the Schuylkill River, an enduring symbol of Philadelphia's rich rowing history, April 2006

In addition to basketball, football, and rowing, schools in the Philadelphia area offer other varsity sports. Temple, for example, fields varsity teams in lacrosse, soccer, volleyball, and several other sports. In 1905, Haverford College played in the first modern intercollegiate soccer match. Penn's fencing team has won three national championships. The schools also offer intramural sports.

== Semi-pro, amateur, and community teams ==
=== Cricket ===
Cricket has a long history of play in Philadelphia, and Philadelphia was one of the last bastions of cricket in the United States. Philadelphia was the center of the "golden age" of American cricket in the late nineteenth and early twentieth centuries. The Philadelphian cricket team represented Philadelphia in first class cricket from 1878 to 1913, and played against some of the top teams in the world. Players on the team include George Patterson, John Lester, and Bart King, perhaps the greatest American cricket player.

The Philadelphia Cricket Club was founded in 1854. Greats such as Bart King, Percy Clark, and Christie Morris played for the team in its prime. Though it was disbanded in 1924, it was revived in 1998. Other cricket clubs in Germantown, Merion, Belmont flourished during the late 19th and early 20th century.

Since 1993, the city has been home to the annual Philadelphia International Cricket Festival, held during the first weekend in May, benefiting the Inglis Foundation. Each year, twelve teams, including five from the area and seven from across the United States or guest international sides, are invited to participate in the festival.

=== Rugby league ===
Rugby league has also been played in the Philadelphia area. The Philadelphia Fight were a part of the USA Rugby League. The club has won three USARL championships. The Aston Bulls, Bucks County Sharks, and Delaware Valley Mantarays played in the AMNRL before the league folded in 2013. The Sharks joined the Fight in USARL upon the folding of AMNRL. In 2015, Delaware Black Foxes joined USARL as an expansion team. Aston, Pennsylvania is regarded as the birthplace of rugby league in America.

=== Rugby union ===
Rugby union is also an increasingly popular sport in the Philadelphia area. Schuylkill River Exiles Rugby Football Club are a Division 1 men's rugby club based in Philadelphia. The team plays matches on public fields in Fairmount Park, and are members of USA Rugby and the Mid-Atlantic Rugby Football Union. The club was founded in 1995. Brandywine Rugby Football Club is a Division 3 Men's Team founded in 1983 Located in Chester county. Media Rugby Football Club is a Division 3 rugby club that was founded in 1978. Media Rugby is a member of USA Rugby and the Mid-Atlantic Rugby Football Union. The Philadelphia Whitemarsh RFC is a division 3 rugby union team in Philadelphia. The team was formed in 1985 after the merging of the Philadelphia and Whitemarsh clubs. The Hibernian RFC formed in 1976 by former Blackthorn RFC players right outside of Philadelphia, in Bucks County. The Northeast Philadelphia Rugby team, also known as the Fish, is a division 3 team in Philadelphia that was formed in 2011.

There are several women's rugby union teams in Philadelphia and the surrounding suburbs. Philadelphia Women's Rugby and Keystone Women's Rugby (in King of Prussia) compete in USA Rugby Division I. Brandywine Women's Rugby (in West Chester) and Doylestown Women's Rugby compete in Division II. Northeast Philadelphia Women's Rugby, associated with the Fish, joined the EPRU in 2011.

=== Soccer ===
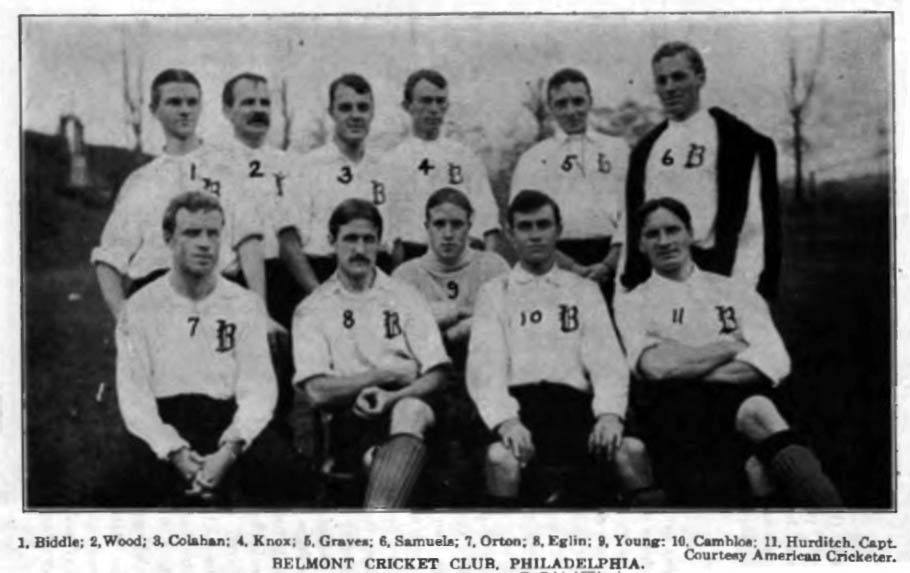
Soccer team of Belmont Cricket Club in 1905

By 1900, soccer had become widely popular among cricket clubs in the city, resulting in the establishment of the "Philadelphia Cricket Clubs League" in 1902. Founding members were the Belmont, Germantown, Kensington, and Frankford clubs. Merion Cricket Club also fielded a team to compete in the recently formed league. The popularity of the sport also attracted some collegiate teams to the league, such as Haverford, which debuted that season.

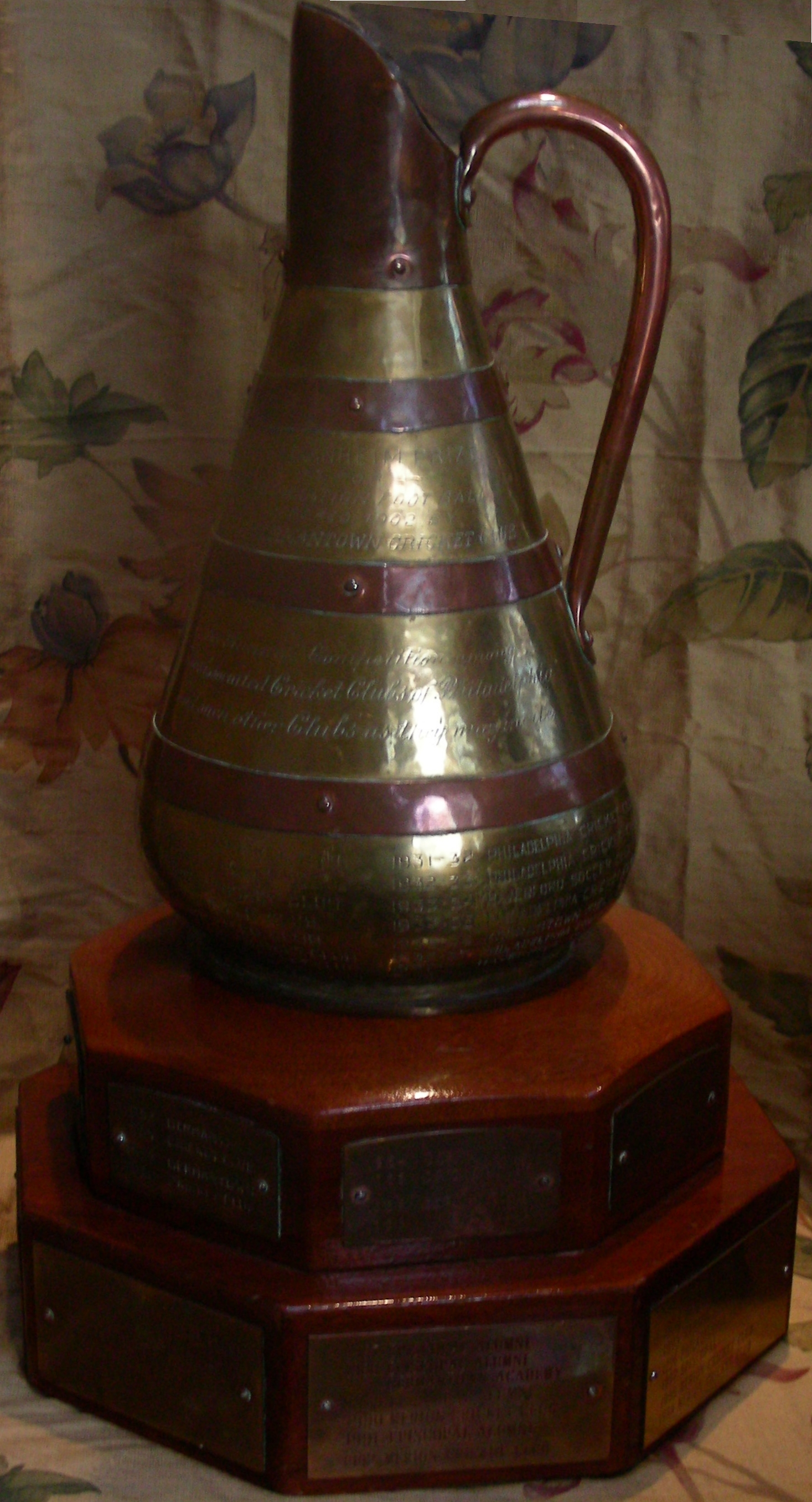
The Manheim Prize, trophy awarded to the winner of the Philadelphia league since 1902

The Philadelphia area has a long history of successful amateur soccer teams. The National Amateur Cup has been won several times by Philadelphia teams; winners include Fleisher Yarn, Philadelphia German-Americans, Philadelphia Inter, and Philadelphia United German-Hungarians. The latter club helped found the United Soccer League of Pennsylvania. The Lighthouse Boys Club is a successful club whose history stretches back to the 19th century. Junior Lone Star FC and West Chester United SC are amateur soccer teams that play in the National Premier Soccer League and USL League Two.

The Philadelphia Lone Star is based in Southwest Philadelphia, and was founded in 2001 by West African immigrants, mainly from Liberia. West Chester United SC was founded in 1976 to bring youth soccer to West Chester, Pennsylvania. Buxmont Torch FC of Perkasie, Pennsylvania also plays in the NPSL. Reading United A.C., founded in 1996, plays in the USL League Two. The club has served as an affiliate of the Union since 2009. The Ocean City Nor'easters, founded in 1996, also play in the USL League Two. The Philadelphia Fever and Philadelphia Ukrainians play in the Women's Premier Soccer League.

=== Other sports ===
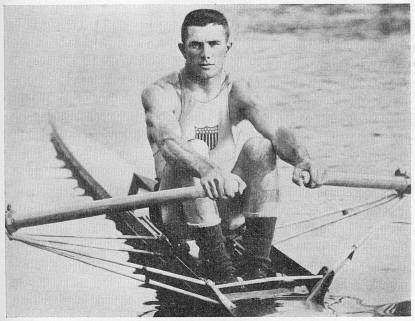
Rower John B. Kelly Sr. of Philadelphia, winner of three Olympic gold medals in the 1920s

There are a number of junior ice hockey teams in the area. The Flyers sponsor three teams: the Philadelphia Flyers Junior Hockey Club, Philadelphia Little Flyers, and Philadelphia Junior Flyers. The Philadelphia Revolution also play in the area. The Philadelphia Flyers Junior Hockey Club plays in the United States Premier Hockey League (USPHL), while the other teams play in the Eastern Hockey League(EHL).

Penn Jersey Roller Derby is a Philadelphia-based co-ed roller derby league, founded in 2005. They were one of the founding leagues of the Old School Derby Association. The Philly Rollergirls are another Philadelphia-based women's roller derby league, founded in 2005. The Philly Rollergirls are a member of the Women's Flat Track Derby Association, and have been host to the WFTDA East Coast Derby Extravaganza tournament since 2007. The Diamond State Roller Girls is a roller derby league based in Wilmington, Delaware.

The Professional Inline Hockey Association has had several franchises in Philadelphia and the surrounding area, including the Philadelphia Growl. The Philadelphia Phoenix play ultimate in the Ultimate Frisbee Association, while the Philadelphia Spinners were previously a Major League Ultimate franchise until that league folded. The Philadelphia Justice are a professional dodgeball team that has played in the National Dodgeball League since 2011. The United States Australian Football League is represented by the Philadelphia Hawks, since 1998.

Due to a long history of Irish immigration, the Philadelphia area has hosted Gaelic games for over a hundred years. The Philadelphia Division GAA Board is the governing body of Gaelic games in Philadelphia. Eddie Alvarez is the former Lightweight Champion of both the UFC and Bellator MMA.

== Individual sports ==
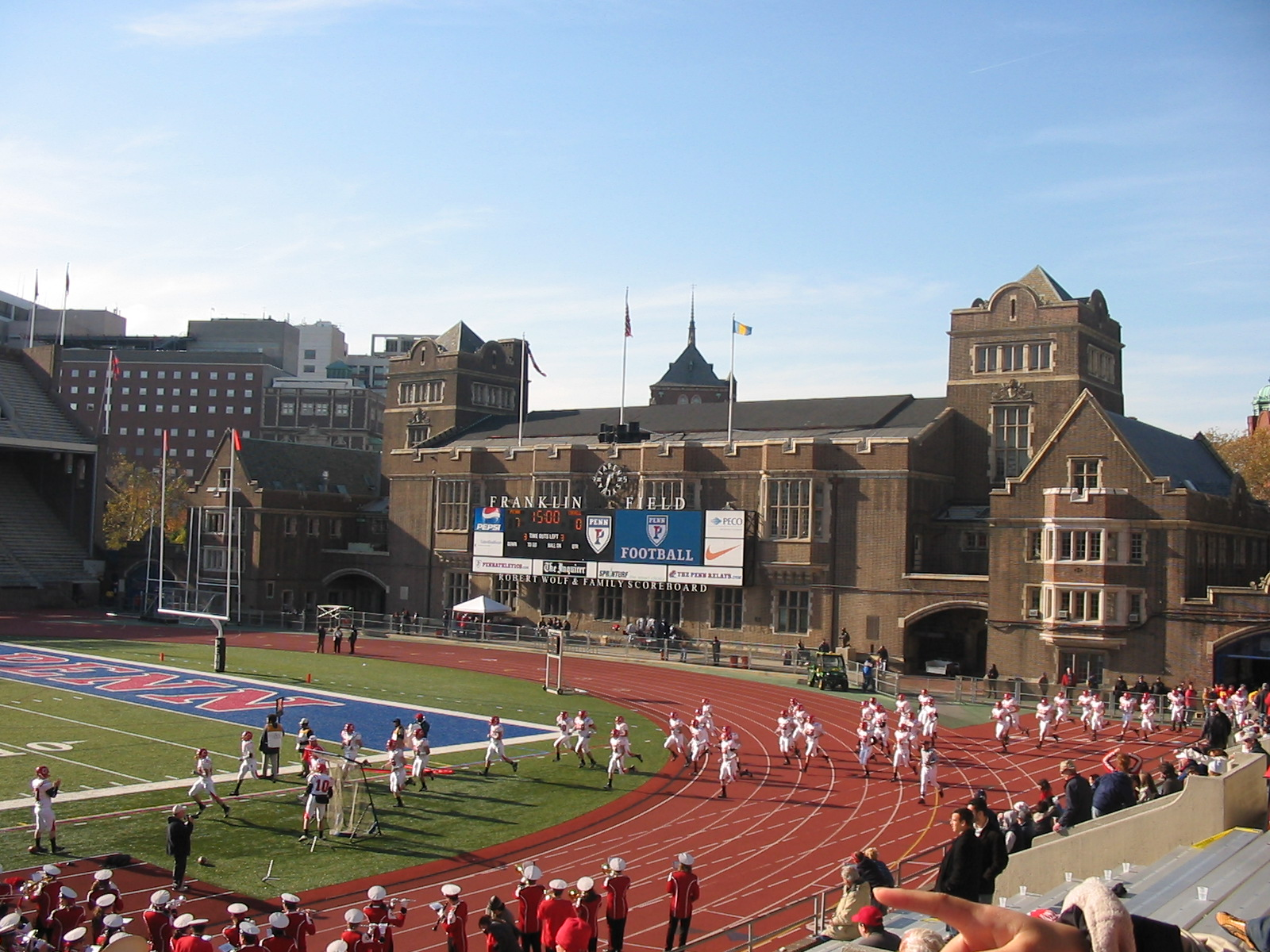
Franklin Field at the University of Pennsylvania hosts the annual Penn Relays

Philadelphia's Franklin Field hosts the annual Penn Relays, the largest early-season track and field meet in the United States. One of the busiest streets in the city, Broad Street, is closed to traffic for the annual Broad Street Run, a 10-mile race contested since 1980. The Philadelphia Marathon, founded in 1954, is an annual marathon held on the third Sunday of November. The city also hosts the Philadelphia Distance Run. Philadelphia has also hosted several one-off events or events without a fixed venue, including UFC 101 and UFC 133. The Xfinity Mobile Arena, Liacouras Center, The Borgata, and other venues in the area host various events. 2300 Arena hosts boxing, mixed martial arts, and professional wrestling events.

=== Boxing ===
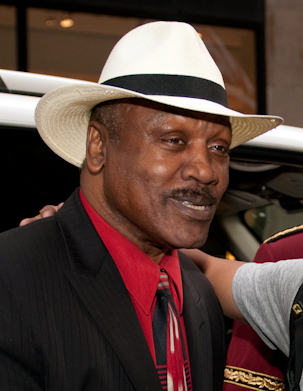
Joe Frazier of Philadelphia, known as "Smokin' Joe", was the world's undisputed heavyweight boxing champion from 1970 to 1973

Philadelphia has a rich history in boxing, with the sport having gained popularity in the 1850s. The 2300 Arena is a prominent venue, and was named 2006 Venue of the Year by ESPN2 boxing program Wednesday Night Fights. The Blue Horizon was also a popular venue before it closed in 2010. Another contribution to the city's love of boxing, comes in the form of fiction, with the classic movie Rocky taking place in the city.

Philadelphia has been the home of several prominent boxers. Though born in Beaufort, South Carolina, former world heavyweight champion and Olympic gold medalist Joe Frazier lived in Philadelphia. Frazier owned and managed a Philadelphia boxing gym before his death in 2011. Philadelphia native Bernard Hopkins is a former world middleweight and light-heavyweight champion. Hopkins is perhaps best known for his incredible longevity, as he has remained active in the light heavyweight division well past his 40th birthday. Other prominent boxers from the Philadelphia area include Danny García, Bryant Jennings, Jesse Hart, Tyrell Biggs, Tommy Loughran, Jimmy Young, Randall "Tex" Cobb, Meldrick Taylor, Tyrone Crawley, Steve Cunningham, Buster Drayton, Joey Giardello, Eric Harding, Matthew Saad Muhammad, Harold Johnson, and David Reid. Muhammad Ali and Sonny Liston also lived in Philadelphia during their boxing careers.

=== Racing ===
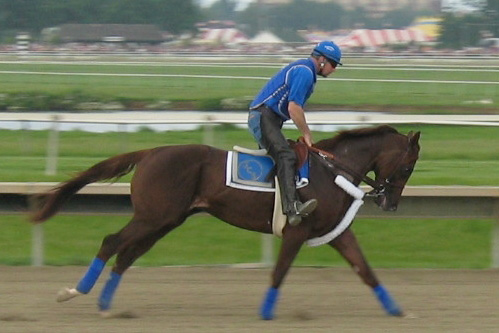
Thoroughbred racehorse Smarty Jones, winner of both the Kentucky Derby and Preakness Stakes in 2004, at Philadelphia Park Racetrack

Philadelphia does not currently host any professional automobile racing, but Philadelphia is in close proximity to Dover Motor Speedway, Pocono Raceway, and Bridgeport Motorsports Park, the latter of which is located right across the Delaware River from Philadelphia. Defunct racing facilities in the area include Trenton Speedway, Langhorne Speedway, Nazareth Speedway, and Flemington Speedway. Midget car racing was popular during the 1930s and 1940s; the two major tracks were Yellow Jacket Speedway, which closed in 1950, and National Speedway, which closed during World War II as a result of fuel rationing. Races were sanctioned by the American Automobile Association. In 2005, the Champ Car World Series negotiated with the city to organize a race, but no agreement was reached. Philadelphia has produced multiple winners of the Indianapolis 500, including Pete DePaolo, Kelly Petillo, and Bill Holland. Other notable drivers from Philadelphia include Skip Barber, Al Holbert, Spencer Wishart, and Kirk Shelmerdine. Mario Andretti and other members of the Andretti family live in nearby Bethlehem, Pennsylvania.

Horse racing became popular in Philadelphia in the mid-1700s, and successful horses continue to be bred in the Philadelphia area. William Penn, the founder of Philadelphia and Pennsylvania, reportedly raced his horses down the streets of Philadelphia. Man o' War, owned by Philadelphia-area businessman Samuel D. Riddle was named the horse of the century by The Blood-Horse magazine. Riddle also owned Triple Crown-winning horse War Admiral. In 2004, Smarty Jones, who was bred in the Philadelphia area, won the Kentucky Derby and the Preakness Stakes. Other horses with ties to the area include Afleet Alex, Barbaro, Hard Spun, and Lil E. Tee. Parx Casino and Racing hosts numerous horse races, including the Pennsylvania Derby, the Cotillion Handicap, and the Greenwood Cup Stakes. The Atlantic City Race Course also hosts horse racing.

=== Cycling ===
The Manayunk area of the city was home to the annual Philadelphia International Championship bike race, which ran from 1985 to 2016. The main feature of the race was the "Manayunk Wall", an inclined street including all of Levering Avenue and a few blocks of Lyceum Avenue. The race may have helped promote a local economic revival, and cycling is a prominent theme of many of the shops and restaurants in the area. The women's Liberty Classic was held at the same time and over the same course.

=== Other sports ===
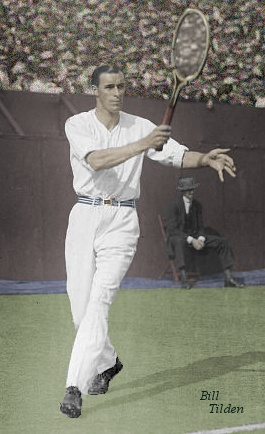
Tennis player Bill Tilden, widely considered one of the best tennis players of the first half of the 20th century.

Golf has a long history in Philadelphia; the Golf Association of Philadelphia is the oldest regional golf association in the United States. Aronimink Golf Club in Newtown Square, Pennsylvania has hosted several PGA and USGA events, including the PGA Championship in 1962 and 2026, along with the 2010 and 2011 AT&T National. Merion Golf Club has hosted five U.S. Opens, most recently in 2013. The Philadelphia Cricket Club has also hosted several PGA events, most recently the Truist Championship in 2025. The Philadelphia PGA Championship and the Philadelphia Open Championship are both hosted in the Philadelphia area. Golfers from the Philadelphia area include Jim Furyk, Dorothy Germain Porter, Jay Sigel, and John McDermott.

Tennis is also a popular sport in Philadelphia. The Advanta Championships of Philadelphia were held in Philadelphia from 1971 to 2005, while the Pennsylvania Lawn Tennis Championship was held in Haverford from 1894 to 1974; it was briefly part of the Grand Prix tennis circuit. Tennis players from the Philadelphia area include Dick Williams, Bill Tilden, Ora Washington, and Vic Seixas. Tilden was the first American to win The Championships, Wimbledon and was one of the most prominent sports figures of the first half of the 20th century.

Willie Mosconi, a Philadelphia native, won the World Straight Pool Championship 15 consecutive times. Mosconi is considered one of the greatest pool players in the history of the game.

The Philadelphia Skating Club and Humane Society is the oldest figure skating club in the United States, and was one of the clubs that founded U.S. Figure Skating.

=== Olympics ===
Philadelphia bid to host the 1920, 1948, 1952 and 1956 Summer Olympics but lost to Antwerp, London, Helsinki, and Melbourne respectively. As part of the 1980 Summer Olympics boycott, Philadelphia hosted the Liberty Bell Classic. Philadelphia has expressed interest in hosting other Olympic Games, including the 2024 Summer Olympics. Many Philadelphians have competed in the Olympics.

== High-school and youth sports ==
Many high school teams play in the Inter-Academic League, the Philadelphia Catholic League, and the Philadelphia Public League. In 2005, the Philadelphia Public League joined the Pennsylvania Interscholastic Athletic Association. In 2014, Mo'ne Davis was named the Associated Press Female Athlete of the Year for her performance in the 2014 Little League World Series as a member of the Taney Dragons.

== People ==
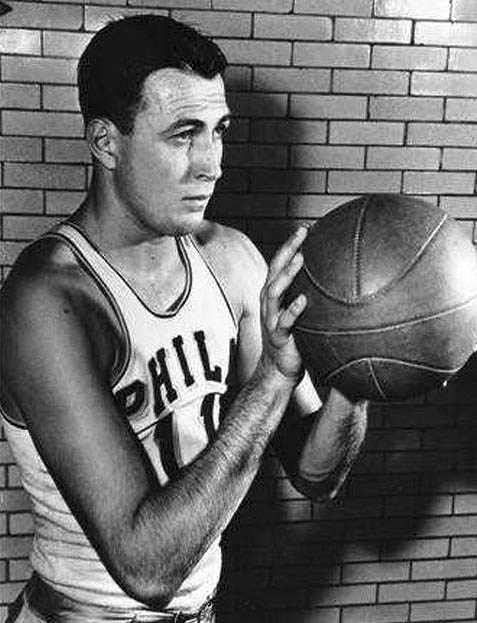
Paul Arizin, one of the 50 Greatest Players in NBA History

Numerous notable athletes were born, raised, or attended college in Philadelphia and the surrounding area. Basketball players from Philadelphia and the surrounding area include Dawn Staley, Debbie Black, Geoff Petrie, Kobe Bryant, Earl Monroe, Rasheed Wallace, Richard Hamilton, Kyle Lowry, and Elena Delle Donne. Football players from Philadelphia include Herb Adderley, Emlen Tunnell, John Cappelletti, Leroy Kelly, Marvin Harrison, Joe Klecko, Joe Flacco, Matt Ryan, Rich Gannon, and Eddie George. Baseball players from Philadelphia include Mike Trout, Goose Goslin, Roy Campanella, Mickey Vernon, Reggie Jackson, Fred Dunlap, Gertrude Dunn, and Mike Piazza. Hockey players from Philadelphia include Hobey Baker and Mike Richter. Soccer players from Philadelphia include Carli Lloyd, Bobby Convey, and Walter Bahr. Athletes from Philadelphia who played for professional Philadelphia teams include Wilt Chamberlain, Paul Arizin, Tom Gola, Guy Rodgers, Del Ennis, Bucko Kilroy, Johnny Callison, Herb Pennock, and Bucky Walters. Notable coaches from Philadelphia include Dodgers manager Tommy Lasorda, Yankees manager Joe McCarthy, long-time NBA coach Jack Ramsay, UConn women's basketball coach Geno Auriemma, Jefferson basketball coach Herb Magee, Mount St. Mary's coach Jim Phelan, La Salle basketball coach Speedy Morris, Wisconsin basketball coach Bo Ryan, and Temple basketball coach John Chaney.

Olympians from the Philadelphia area include gymnast Mohini Bhardwaj, swimmers Maddy Crippen, Brendan Hansen, David Berkoff, Joe Verdeur, Carl Robie, Ellie Daniel, and John Macionis, track and field athletes Carl Lewis, John Taylor, Jean Shiley, Barney Berlinger, Mel Sheppard, Ted Meredith, Horace Ashenfelter, Leroy Burrell, Kim Gallagher, Bill Toomey, Jon Drummond, Ira Davis, Alvin Kraenzlein, and Mike Powell, rowers Paul Costello, John B. Kelly Sr., and John B. Kelly Jr., figure skater Tara Lipinski, diver Elizabeth Becker-Pinkston, and sailor Don Cohan.

Other prominent Philadelphia sports figures include Flyers owner Ed Snider, Philadelphia Warriors owner Eddie Gottlieb, Sixers director of statistical information Harvey Pollack, Philadelphia Athletics owner Connie Mack, former NFL commissioner Bert Bell, former Phillies general manager Pat Gillick, former Phillies managers Larry Bowa, Charlie Manuel, and Dallas Green, former Flyers coach Fred Shero, former Sixers coaches Alex Hannum and Billy Cunningham, and former Eagles head coaches Doug Pederson, Greasy Neale, and Dick Vermeil. Since 2004, many of the most accomplished Philadelphia athletes and sports figures have been inducted into the Philadelphia Sports Hall of Fame.

== Sports media ==
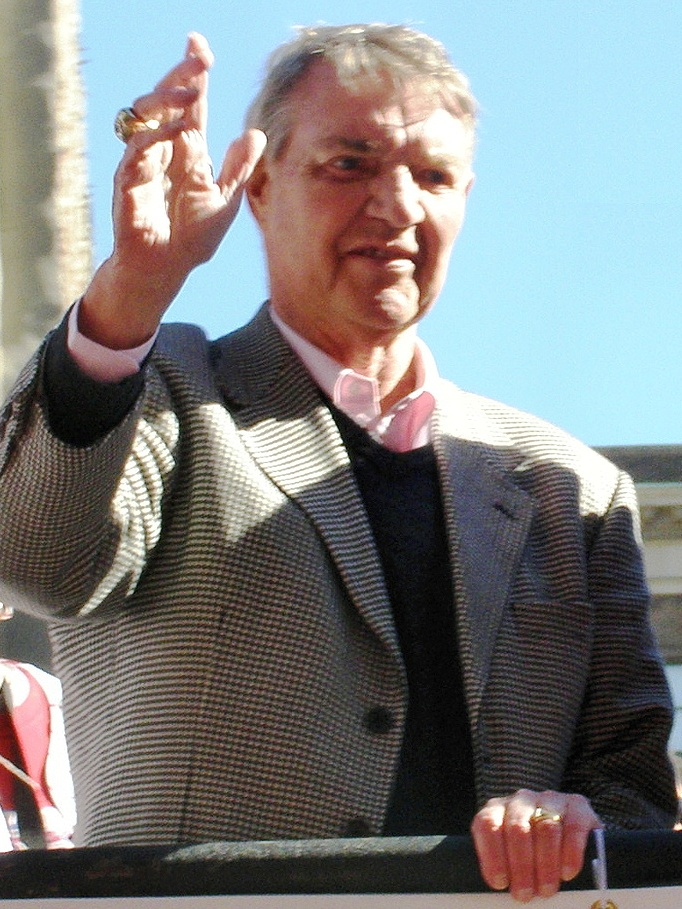
Harry Kalas, a beloved play-by-play announcer for the Philadelphia Phillies from 1971 until his death in 2009

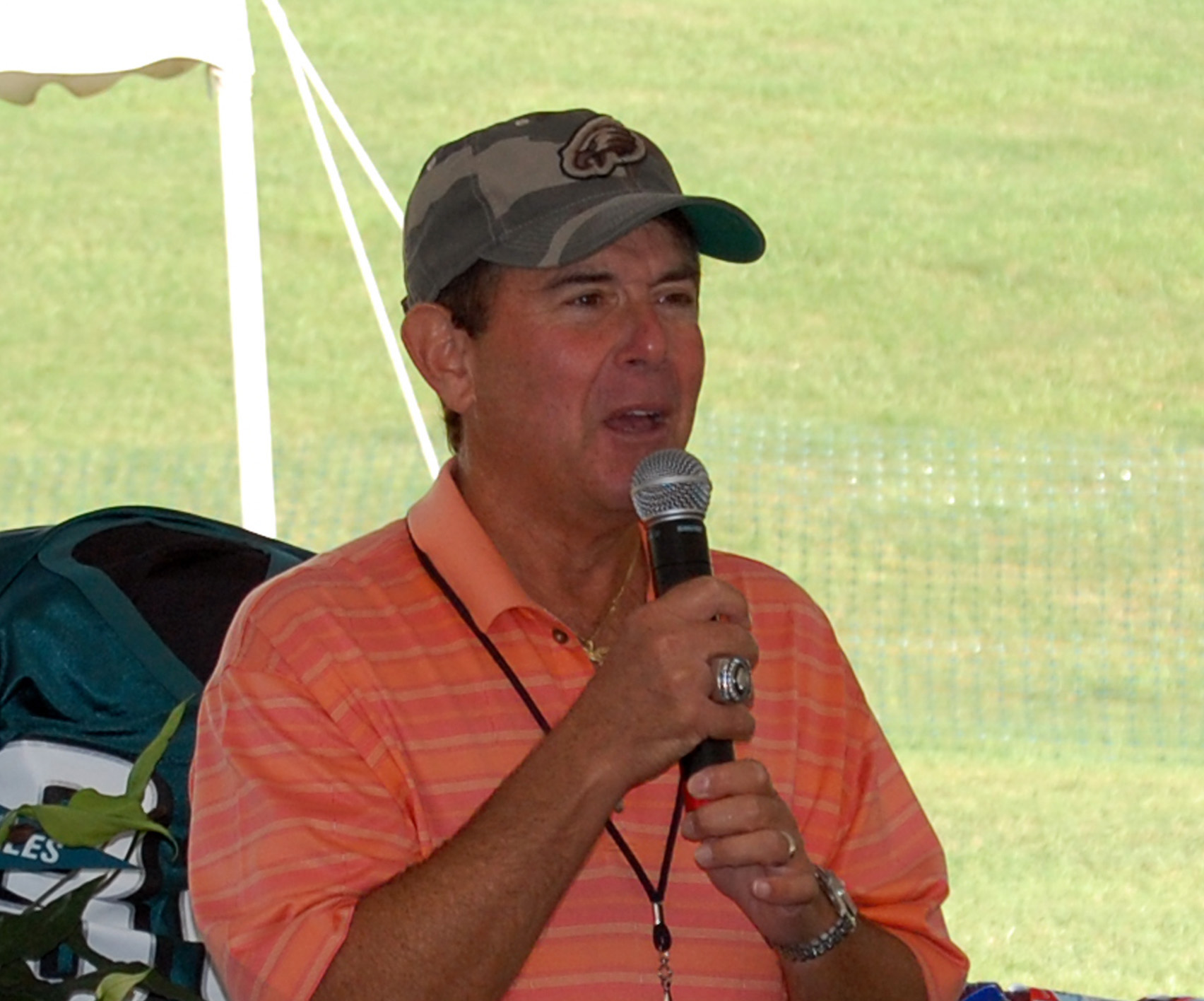
Merrill Reese has served as the Philadelphia Eagles' radio play-by-play announcer since 1977

As of 2023, Philadelphia has the fourth-largest media market in the United States, with almost three million television homes. NBC Sports Philadelphia is a cable television channel that covers Philadelphia and regional sports. The channel, as well as sister streaming service Peacock, carries all Phillies, Flyers, and 76ers games that are not nationally televised, along with numerous Philadelphia-area college sports events. Sister channel NBC Sports Philadelphia Plus carries games when more than one team is playing at the same time. Due to the NFL's centralized television rights format, the Eagles, as an NFC team, usually play on WTXF-TV (Fox), although games can also appear on KYW-TV (CBS), WPVI-TV (ABC), WCAU (NBC), ESPN, NFL Network, or streaming on Amazon Prime Video. All Union games are broadcast on Apple TV's MLS Season Pass. The two major sports radio stations in the Philadelphia area are 94.1 WIP and 97.5 WPEN. WIP broadcasts all Phillies and Eagles games, while WPEN broadcasts all Sixers, Flyers, and Union games. 1210 WPHT carries Phillies games when the Eagles are playing at the same time on WIP, and 93.3 WMMR carries Flyers games when the 76ers are playing at the same time on WPEN.

Prominent members of the sports media (past and present) include Richie Ashburn (who also played for the Phillies), Gene Hart, Harry Kalas, Merrill Reese, Jayson Stark, Jack Whitaker, Bill Campbell, Ray Didinger, Phil Jasner, Bill Conlin, Michael Barkann, Angelo Cataldi, Mike Missanelli and Howard Eskin. The Philadelphia Sports Writers Association presents annual awards.

Several films have depicted sports in Philadelphia. Most prominently, the Rocky film franchise follows the boxing career of Philadelphia resident Rocky Balboa, first as a fighter and later as a trainer. The film Invincible was based on Vince Papale's career as a player on the Philadelphia Eagles. The Garbage Picking Field Goal Kicking Philadelphia Phenomenon starred Tony Danza as the kicker of the Philadelphia Eagles. Broad Street Bullies is a documentary that chronicles the early history of the Philadelphia Flyers. The film Pride follows swim coach Jim Ellis in 1970s Philadelphia. The Mighty Macs depicts the Immaculata College women's basketball teams of the early 1970s, with Carla Gugino starring as head coach Cathy Rush. The main character of the film Silver Linings Playbook is an Eagles fan who closely follows the 2008 Eagles season throughout the film.

== See also ==
- Philadelphia Sports Hall of Fame
