= Tom Machowski =

American ice hockey player (born 1953)

- Born: May 7, 1953 (age 72); Chicago, Illinois, United States
- Height: 6 ft 3 in (191 cm)
- Weight: 190 lb (86 kg; 13 st 8 lb)
- Position: Defense
- Played for: NEHL/EHL; Jersey/Hampton Aces; Johnstown Wings; Utica Mohawks; Salem Raiders; IHL; Milwaukee Admirals
- National team: United States
- NHL draft: 101st overall, 1973; Atlanta Flames
- WHA draft: 85th overall, 1973; Minnesota Fighting Saints
- Playing career: 1975–1981

Thomas E. Machowski (born May 7, 1953) is a retired American professional ice hockey defenseman. He was selected by the Atlanta Flames in the 7th round (101st overall) of the 1973 NHL Amateur Draft.

Machowski played high school hockey in Wilmette, Illinois in the Catholic League with the Loyola Academy Ramblers from 1969 to 1971. He was selected to the All-League Team in all three of his high school seasons, and was named the Catholic League's Most Valuable Player in his senior year. In 1971, Machowski was inducted into Loyola Academy's Athletic Hall of Fame.

Machowski attended the University of Wisconsin–Madison, on a full athletic scholarship, where he played four seasons (1971 – 1975) of NCAA college hockey with the Wisconsin Badgers. During the 1972–73 season, he led the Badgers with 48 penalty minutes as he helped his team to win the 1973 NCAA Championship.

In 1976, Machowski toured the United States as a member of the USA National pre-Olympic in preparation for the 1976 Winter Olympics, but did not compete at the Innsbruck games.

Between 1978 and 1981 (with the exception of four games played with the Milwaukee Admirals during the 1979–80 IHL season) Machowski played professionally in the Eastern Hockey League (EHL) for all three seasons of the troubled league's existence. In 1981 the EHL folded, and Machowski retired.

== Career statistics ==
| | | | Regular season | | | | | Playoffs |
| Season | Team | League | GP | G | A | Pts | PIM | GP | G | A | Pts | PIM |
|---|---|---|---|---|---|---|---|---|---|---|---|---|
| 1971–72 | University of Wisconsin | NCAA | 23 | 1 | 4 | 5 | 10 | — | — | — | — | — |
| 1972–73 | University of Wisconsin | NCAA | 40 | 1 | 13 | 14 | 48 | — | — | — | — | — |
| 1973–74 | University of Wisconsin | NCAA | 36 | 3 | 13 | 16 | 48 | — | — | — | — | — |
| 1974–75 | University of Wisconsin | NCAA | 38 | 2 | 1 | 3 | 44 | — | — | — | — | — |
| 1975–76 | Waterloo Black Hawks | USHL-Sr. | 40 | 2 | 25 | 27 | 44 | — | — | — | — | — |
| 1976–77 | Waterloo Black Hawks | USHL | 48 | 9 | 25 | 34 | 48 | — | — | — | — | — |
| 1977–78 | Waterloo Black Hawks | USHL | 47 | 17 | 41 | 58 | 66 | — | — | — | — | — |
| 1978–79 | Jersey/Hampton Aces | NEHL | 12 | 1 | 3 | 4 | 2 | — | — | — | — | — |
| 1978–79 | Johnstown Wings | NEHL | 54 | 3 | 15 | 18 | 12 | — | — | — | — | — |
| 1979–80 | Milwaukee Admirals | IHL | 4 | 0 | 0 | 0 | 2 | — | — | — | — | — |
| 1979–80 | Utica Mohawks | EHL-Pro | 31 | 4 | 10 | 14 | 14 | 4 | 0 | 2 | 2 | 0 |
| 1980–81 | Salem Raiders | EHL-Pro | 17 | 1 | 5 | 6 | 12 | — | — | — | — | — |
| IHL totals | | | 4 | 0 | 0 | 0 | 2 | — | — | — | — | — |
| USHL totals | | | 135 | 28 | 91 | 119 | 158 | — | — | — | — | — |
| NEHL totals | | | 66 | 4 | 18 | 22 | 14 | — | — | — | — | — |
| EHL-Pro totals | | | 48 | 5 | 15 | 20 | 26 | 4 | 0 | 2 | 2 | 0 |
