= Paul Miller (ice hockey) =

American ice hockey player (born 1959)

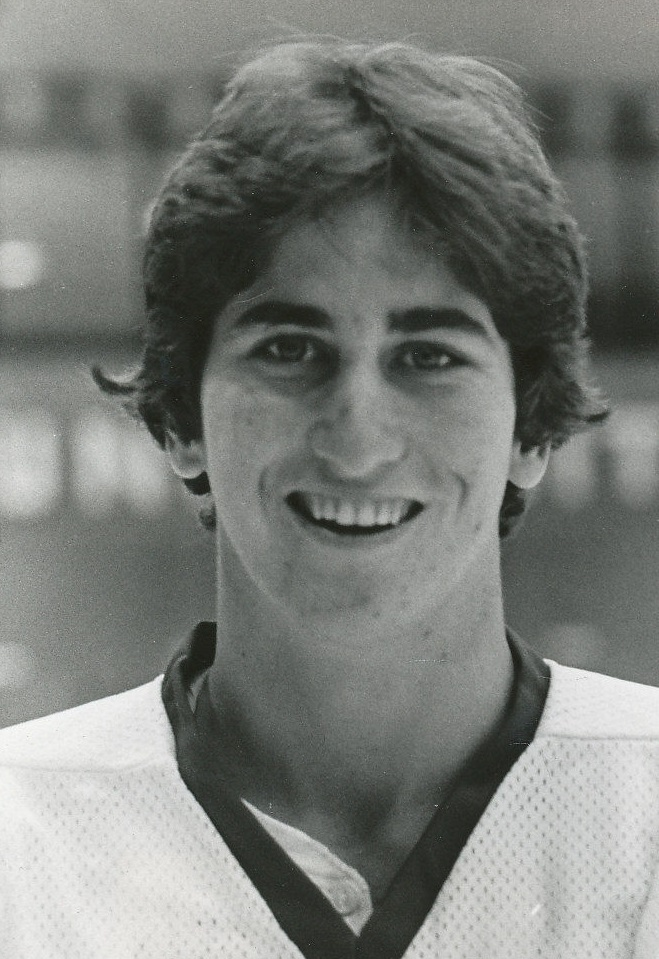
- Paul Miller in 1981
- Born: August 21, 1959 (age 66) Billerica, Massachusetts, U.S.
- Height: 5 ft 10 in (178 cm)
- Weight: 170 lb (77 kg; 12 st 2 lb)
- Position: Center
- Shot: Left
- Played for: Colorado Rockies
- National team: United States
- NHL draft: Undrafted
- Playing career: 1980–1984

Paul Edward Miller (born August 21, 1959) is an American former professional ice hockey forward who played three games in the National Hockey League for the Colorado Rockies. He was a member of the 1978 NCAA Champion Boston University Hockey Team. He is the younger brother of Bob Miller.

== Career statistics ==
=== Regular season and playoffs ===
			Regular season					Playoffs
Season	Team	League	GP	G	A	Pts	PIM	GP	G	A	Pts	PIM
1976–77	Billerica Memorial High School	HS-MA	—	—	—	—	—	—	—	—	—	—
1977–78	Boston University	ECAC	31	10	14	24	28	—	—	—	—	—
1978–79	Boston University	ECAC	29	15	20	35	10	—	—	—	—	—
1979–80	Boston University	ECAC	20	4	10	14	13	—	—	—	—	—
1979–80	Flint Generals	IHL	13	3	2	5	31	5	1	1	2	6
1980–81	Syracuse Hornets	EHL	10	3	5	8	9	—	—	—	—	—
1980–81	Richmond Rifles	EHL	21	9	16	25	20	10	1	2	3	19
1981–82	Colorado Rockies	NHL	3	0	3	3	0	—	—	—	—	—
1981–82	Fort Worth Texans	CHL	65	25	38	63	44	—	—	—	—	—
1982–83	Wichita Wind	CHL	55	17	18	35	44	—	—	—	—	—
1982–83	Moncton Alpines	AHL	19	2	8	10	7	—	—	—	—	—
1983–84	Muskegon Mohawks	IHL	4	0	1	1	0	—	—	—	—	—
1983–84	Moncton Alpines	AHL	46	9	2	11	68	—	—	—	—	—
1983–84	Milwaukee Admirals	IHL	3	1	3	4	2	—	—	—	—	—
CHL totals			120	42	56	98	88	—	—	—	—	—
NHL totals			3	0	3	3	0	—	—	—	—	—

=== International ===
Year	Team	Event	GP	G	A	Pts	PIM
1977	United States	WJC	7	6	0	6	0
1982	United States	WC	4	0	0	0	0
Junior totals			7	6	0	6	0
Senior totals			4	0	0	0	0
