= Hartford Whalers =

Professional ice hockey team (1972–1997)

- Founded: 1972
- History: New England Whalers; 1972–1979 (WHA); Hartford Whalers; 1979–1997 (NHL); Carolina Hurricanes; 1997–present
- Home arena: Boston Arena; Boston Garden; Big E Coliseum; Springfield Civic Center; Hartford Civic Center
- City: Hartford, Connecticut
- Team colors: Forest green, black, white (1972–1975) Green, gold, white (1975–1979) Green, blue, white (1979–1992) Navy, green, silver, white (1992–1997)
- Stanley Cups: 0
- Avco World Trophies: 1 (1972–73)
- Conference championships: 2 (1972–73, 1977–78)
- Presidents' Trophies: 0
- Division championships: 4 (1972–73, 1973–74, 1974–75, 1986–87)

The Hartford Whalers were a professional ice hockey team based for most of its 25-year existence in Hartford, Connecticut. The club played in the World Hockey Association (WHA) from 1972 until 1979, and in the National Hockey League (NHL) from 1979 to 1997.

Originally based in Boston, they were charter members of the WHA, known as the New England Whalers for all seven seasons. After their second season, the team moved ninety-four miles (151 km) southwest to Hartford in April 1974; five years later, the Whalers joined the NHL in the 1979 NHL–WHA merger and were renamed the "Hartford Whalers" because the Boston Bruins did not want to share a geographical market with the team.

After 25 years in New England and in Hartford, the franchise relocated to North Carolina in 1997 and became the Carolina Hurricanes.

== WHA history ==
=== Early seasons in Boston (1971–1974) ===
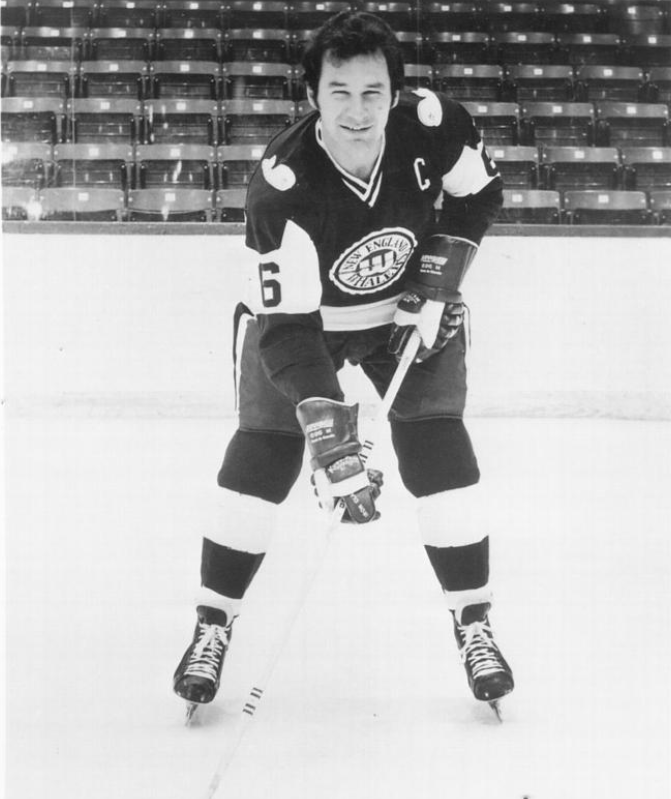
Ted Green was the first ever captain of the Whalers, doing so from 1972 to 1975; he recorded a goal and three assists in the Avco Cup Final in 1973 as the Whalers won their only championship

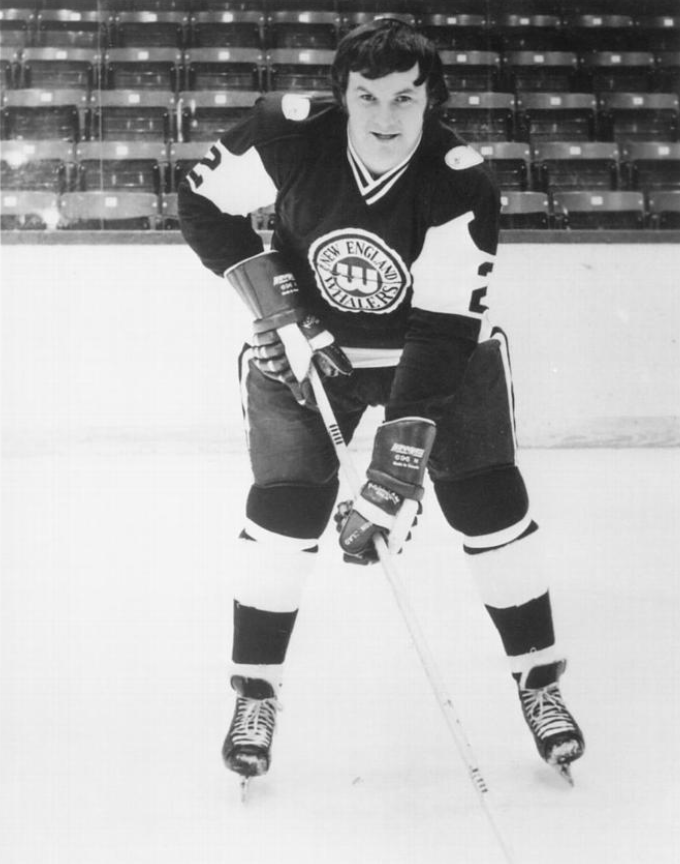
Rick Ley was captain of the Whalers from 1975 to 1980, making him one of two Whalers to be captain for six seasons.

The Whalers franchise was created in November 1971 when the World Hockey Association (WHA) awarded a franchise to New England businessmen Howard Baldwin, W. Godfrey Wood, John Coburn, and William Edward Barnes to begin play in Boston. The team began auspiciously, signing former Detroit Red Wings player Tom Webster; hard-rock Boston Bruins' defenseman Ted Green (the team's inaugural captain); Toronto Maple Leafs' defensemen Rick Ley, Jim Dorey, and Brad Selwood; and former Pittsburgh Penguins' goaltender Al Smith.

New England signed an unusually large number of American players, including Massachusetts natives and former U.S. Olympic hockey team members Larry Pleau (a regular with the Montreal Canadiens the previous season), Kevin Ahearn, John Cunniff, and Paul Hurley. Two other ex-U.S. Olympians on the Whalers' roster (Timothy Sheehy and Tom Williams) had spent a significant part of their careers in Boston with Boston College and the Bruins, respectively.

The Whalers had the WHA's best regular-season record in the 1972–73 season. Webster led the team in scoring and through the playoffs. Behind legendary ex-Boston University head coach Jack Kelley, the team defeated the Winnipeg Jets to win the inaugural WHA championship.

The club played first season's home games at Boston Garden and Boston Arena. However, the Arena was too small and antiquated to sustain a WHA team while the Garden was owned by the rival NHL Bruins in which the Whalers found themselves fourth in priority for dates behind the Bruins, Boston Celtics, and even the American Hockey League's Boston Braves. Fed up with the situation, Baldwin decided to move elsewhere. In late February 1974, he announced the Whalers' upcoming relocation to Hartford, targeted for early April.

=== Relocation to Hartford (1974) ===
Hartford was about to open a new, modern downtown arena and convention center, the Hartford Civic Center. The city had hoped to get an American Basketball Association (ABA) team as the main tenant, but when that fell through, city leaders got in touch with the Whalers. Aside from various minor league teams in New Haven, the area had been largely bereft of professional hockey until the Whalers' arrival. The Civic Center was still being finished when the 1974–75 season began, so the Whalers played the first part of the season at the Big E Coliseum in West Springfield, Massachusetts, about thirty miles (50 km) north.

On January 11, 1975, the team played its first game at the Hartford Civic Center in front of a sellout crowd. The franchise remained in Hartford until it relocated to North Carolina for the 1997–98 season, albeit with an interruption for three years (January 1977-February 1980) where the team elected to play at the Springfield Civic Center when heavy snow and rain caused the roof of the Hartford arena to collapse.

Though they never again won the WHA championship, the New England Whalers were a successful team, never missing the playoffs in league history, and finishing first in their division three times. They had a more stable roster than most WHA teams: Ley, Webster, Selwood, Pleau, and Tommy Earl played over 350 games each with the club. The team scored a major coup when it signed legend Gordie Howe and his sons Mark and Marty from the Houston Aeros in 1977.

The Whalers recorded losing records in their first two full seasons in Hartford, their final two WHA seasons saw more success. They went to the finals again in 1978, with a veteran team spearheaded by the Howes—50-year-old Gordie led the team in scoring—future NHL stars Gordie Roberts and Mike Rogers, All-Star defenseman Ron Plumb, and forwards John McKenzie, Dave Keon, and Mike Antonovich, and possessed the league's best defense. The next season was not as great, however, but while age finally caught up with Gordie Howe, the slack was picked up by Andre Lacroix, the WHA's all-time leading scorer, acquired from the Aeros.

== Admission to the NHL ==
The original Hartford Whalers logo (1979–1992), designed by Peter Good, a Connecticut-based graphic designer. It combines a green "W" with a blue whale's tail to create the letter "H" in the negative (white) space in the center of the logo between the two shapes.

As the Whalers were one of the most stable WHA teams, the club was one of the four franchises admitted to the NHL when the rival leagues merged in 1979. Unlike the other former WHA teams, the Whalers were not stripped of most of their players. The Howes, Rogers, Ley, Keon, Smith, Roberts and Lacroix are the New England Whalers players who stayed on the team as it made the transition to the NHL and became the Hartford Whalers. (In the case of the Howes, Detroit intentionally turned down their option to re-sign longtime Red Wing Gordie, out of respect for his legacy already in place there.) Only Selwood, George Lyle and Warren Miller were reclaimed by their former NHL teams. The Whalers were the only American-based WHA team to join the NHL.

The New England Whalers renamed themselves the Hartford Whalers in May 1979, at the insistence of the Boston Bruins who objected to the team naming themselves for New England. Connecticut-based graphic designer Peter Good (1942–2023) was hired by the Jack Lardis Associates advertising agency to design a new logo for the team. Good put a whale's tail over a "W", allowing the negative space between the two shapes to create an "H". Good also helped design the team's new uniforms for the 1979–80 season in the team's new colors of green and blue.

== NHL history ==
The Whalers were never as successful in the NHL as they had been in the WHA. They recorded only three winning seasons in their 18 years in the NHL, made the Stanley Cup playoffs eight times and won only one playoff series, earning the nickname "The Forever .500s" in mocking jest of their winning percentage. Whenever they did make the playoffs, they faced the near-certainty of having to get past the Boston Bruins or Montreal Canadiens to make it to the conference finals. The team developed a heated rivalry with the Bruins because they were based only 100 miles northeast of Hartford and the fact they used to play in the same arena. Home games against the Bruins usually attracted the Whalers' largest crowds, as many Bruins fans followed their team to Hartford. The Whalers had an all-time head-to-head record of 37–69–12 against Boston.

The Whalers were hampered by numerous off-ice factors. Hartford was the smallest American market in the NHL and was located on the traditional dividing line between the home territories for Boston and New York area teams. This limited the team's marketability. Additionally, for most of the Whalers' tenure as an NHL team, the Hartford Civic Center was one of the smallest arenas in the league. At its maximum, it seated just 15,635 for hockey. The team averaged over 14,000 fans only twice in its 15 years at the Civic Center. They averaged only 13,867 from 1980 to 1997. Most of their sellouts came when either the Bruins, the New York Islanders, or the New York Rangers played in Hartford, bringing thousands of their own fans with them.

=== Inaugural NHL season ===
Upon joining the NHL, the Whalers were placed in the Norris Division of the Wales Conference. Their first NHL season in 1979–80 looked somewhat promising. They were led by Mike Rogers, Blaine Stoughton, Dave Keon, Mark Howe, Rick Ley, NHL legend Gordie Howe and the all-time WHA leading scorer, Andre Lacroix, along with the franchise's first starting goaltender, Al Smith. The Whalers also acquired another NHL legend, Bobby Hull, near the NHL trade deadline in 1980. They finished the season with 73 points and a playoff berth and had the best record of the four former WHA franchises that entered the NHL in 1979–80. The Whalers remained the most recent first-year expansion franchise to make the playoffs in their inaugural season, along with the 1979–80 Edmonton Oilers until the 2017–18 Vegas Golden Knights accomplished the feat. In the first round of the playoffs, the Whalers were swept by the Montreal Canadiens three games to none. Following this season, Gordie Howe, Bobby Hull and Andre Lacroix all announced their retirements from professional hockey.

=== The early 1980s ===
Following the 1979–80 season, the Whalers had many aging veterans left over from their WHA days. To make matters worse, the Whalers reputation of making disastrous trades began to unfold, as the team began to trade away stars for mediocre players in an attempt to gain depth, with one notable example being when they traded star defenseman Mark Howe and their first NHL scoring leader, Mike Rogers, in separate deals for players and draft picks which never panned out, and also swapped defensive-defenseman Gordie Roberts, who would go on to play 15 remaining professional seasons, for the remaining half of the season of Mike Fidler's NHL career. For the 1981–82 season, the NHL realigned its divisions and the Whalers were resituated in the Adams Division of the Wales Conference. The Whalers bottomed out in the 1982–83 season with a record of 19–54–7 (45 points), ranked 20th out of 21 teams in the NHL standings. On May 2, 1983, the Whalers hired Emile Francis as their new general manager to rebuild the team. About two months later, on July 7, Francis hired Jack Evans to be the Whalers' new head coach. By the end of the 1986–87 season, Francis had cut or traded away every player from the 1982–83 Whalers' roster save for Ron Francis, Paul MacDermid, and Paul Lawless.

=== Success in the mid-1980s ===
The team had a brief period of success in the 1985–86 and 1986–87 seasons. The Whalers began 1985–86 looking like a playoff contender. By the end of January, they had a record of 26–20–1 for 53 points after 47 games. At this time, however, the Whalers began to struggle when they lost their franchise player Ron Francis and star goal scorer Kevin Dineen to injuries. As a result, the Whalers struggled through February, winning just two games in the month and in danger of missing the playoffs for the sixth year in a row. In March, Francis and Dineen returned from their injuries and the Whalers put up a record of 12–4–2 in the months of March and April. The Whalers finished fourth in the Adams Division in the 1985–86 regular season, earning themselves a playoff berth for the first time since 1980. The Whalers went on to eliminate the first-place Quebec Nordiques in a three-game sweep in the first round, winning their first, and only, NHL playoff series in Hartford. The Whalers then pushed the division finals to seven games, losing the final game 2–1 in overtime to the eventual Stanley Cup champions, the Montreal Canadiens.

The following season, 1986–87, the Whalers won their lone division championship, led by centers Ron Francis and Ray Ferraro, emerging winger Kevin Dineen, defenseman Ulf Samuelsson, superstar goaltender Mike Liut and scorer Sylvain Turgeon. The 93 points earned that season were the most they would earn as an NHL team in Hartford; however, they were quickly eliminated in the first round by the Nordiques. The Whalers started the series strongly, winning the first two games at home, but, beginning in Game 3, the Nordiques were able to successfully take the Whalers off their game by playing a tough, chippy style of hockey. As a result, both teams broke NHL records in penalty minutes for an individual playoff game and a whole playoff series. The Nordiques won the next four games and thus the series, four games to two. While Hartford would make the playoffs for the next five seasons in a row, they never came close to duplicating their previous success, with one exception in the 1989–90 season.

=== The 1989–90 season ===
In 1989–90, the Whalers finished seventh overall in the NHL standings and fourth overall in the Wales Conference, with 85 points. This was the franchise's second-highest point total in the NHL while located in Hartford. The regular season was highlighted by captain Ron Francis putting up career highs in goals (32), assists (69) and points (101). Later in his career, Francis was only able to exceed 101 points once (in 1995–96) and never again exceeded 32 goals in a single season. At the trade deadline, the Whalers first year general manager Eddie Johnston made the first in a series of destructive trades by sending franchise goaltender Mike Liut to the Washington Capitals in exchange for center Yvon Corriveau. Liut was having a career year during the 1989–90 season and this trade left the Whalers with sophomore goaltender Peter Sidorkiewicz as their starter, with rookie Kay Whitmore as the backup.

The Whalers went on to face the Boston Bruins in the first round of the playoffs. In Game 4, the Whalers were in front of their home crowd with a two games to one series lead and a 5–2 lead in the game entering the third period. Bruins starting goaltender Reggie Lemelin was struggling throughout the series and was replaced by backup Andy Moog in the third period. At the same time, Peter Sidorkiewicz began struggling in goal for the Whalers, and the Bruins scored four unanswered goals in the third period, winning the game 6–5. Sidorkiewicz struggled for the rest of the series and Moog was spectacular for the Bruins. Without Liut, the Whalers had to either stick with Sidorkiewicz, which they did, or use the unproven rookie, Kay Whitmore, in goal. Goaltending turned out to be one of the big differences in this series and the Bruins won it in seven games.

=== The Ron Francis trade ===
On March 4, 1991, Francis was traded to the Pittsburgh Penguins, along with Ulf Samuelsson and Grant Jennings, in exchange for John Cullen, Zarley Zalapski and Jeff Parker. Francis was one of the most popular players on the team, and held nearly every significant offensive record in the franchise's history, both in the WHA and NHL. The trade was savagely condemned by Whalers fans, few of whom believed The Hockey News assessment that the Whalers had actually come out on the better end of the trade. Parker would only play four games in Hartford before suffering a concussion and a knee injury within two weeks of each other, effectively ending his NHL career. The Francis trade was made all the more painful when Francis and Samuelsson promptly helped lead the Penguins to two consecutive Stanley Cup titles. Coincidentally, Eddie Johnston, the Hartford general manager who had orchestrated the Francis trade, would follow him to Pittsburgh as the Penguins' head coach two years later.

The trades that Johnston made, particularly the Ron Francis trade, proved to be disastrous for the Whalers, since the players acquired did not meet the team's expectations, leaving the Whalers depleted of talent and costing them substantial goodwill in Hartford.

=== The 1992 playoffs ===
The Whalers went to the playoffs for the final time in 1991–92 behind Jimmy Roberts' coaching, despite winning only 26 games. In those days, however, the top four teams in each division made the playoffs, regardless of record. They faced the heavily-favored Montreal Canadiens in the division semifinals. The Whalers lost Game 1 by a score of 2–0 and Game 2 by a score of 5–2, creating the expectation that the Canadiens would sweep the Whalers out of the first round, as they did in the 1989 playoffs. However, the Whalers came back home to win Games 3 and 4 by scores of 5–2 and 3–1, respectively. The main turning point in the series came in the second period of Game 5 — the Whalers had a 3–1 lead midway through the second period, where the Canadiens began rushing the crease and getting in the face of Whalers goaltender Frank Pietrangelo to distract him. The strategy worked, as the Canadiens scored four unanswered goals in the final five minutes of the second period. These goals were not called back, since this was before the time when the NHL began strictly enforcing crease infractions on goals. The Whalers lost Game 5 by a score of 7–4. The Whalers came back to win Game 6 by a score of 2–1 just 24 seconds into overtime on a goal by Yvon Corriveau. The series went back to Montreal for game 7 and the Whalers lost a dramatic double overtime game by a score of 3–2, as Russ Courtnall scored on a turnaround shot against Pietrangelo. Corriveau had an excellent chance for a second consecutive overtime winner in the first overtime period on a breakaway, but his shot missed the net. It was the last time the Whalers would qualify for the playoffs for the rest of their time in Hartford.

Roberts was fired thereafter, along with general manager Eddie Johnston. At the end of the three-year Johnston era, only seven players remained from the Whalers' active roster prior to Johnston taking over as general manager. Those players were forwards Ed Kastelic and Terry Yake; defensemen Randy Ladouceur, Brad Shaw and Adam Burt; and goaltenders Peter Sidorkiewicz and Kay Whitmore. During the summer of 1992, following Johnston's departure, Shaw and Whitmore were traded away, Kastelic left via free agency and Sidorkiewicz was lost to the Ottawa Senators in the 1992 NHL expansion draft.

=== The Brian Burke and Paul Holmgren years ===
In the summer of 1992, the Whalers hired Brian Burke to replace Eddie Johnston as general manager to rebuild the Whalers. Burke had worked for the Vancouver Canucks, helping them build the team that eventually went to the 1994 Stanley Cup Final. Burke hired Paul Holmgren to be the Whalers' new head coach. Holmgren had been the head coach of the Philadelphia Flyers. Holmgren immediately named Pat Verbeek the new captain and he ended up playing on a line with young stars Andrew Cassels and Geoff Sanderson. The Whalers also acquired goaltender Sean Burke in exchange for former first-round draft pick Bobby Holik. Cassels, Sanderson and Sean Burke remained star players for the Whalers through their final season in Hartford. In addition, future NHL star Michael Nylander began his NHL career with the Whalers during the 1992–93 season. Since the 1992–93 season was a rebuilding year for the Whalers, they finished the season with only 58 points, the second-worst point total in franchise history, and missed the playoffs for the first time since 1985.

The Whalers entered the 1993–94 season as members of the Northeast Division of the Eastern Conference, and with high hopes from a core of young talented players. The Whalers were also able to draft defenseman Chris Pronger, who began his career with the Whalers, playing alongside veteran defenseman Brad McCrimmon, and later became an NHL star. However, problems began at the management level when general manager Brian Burke announced he would resign when the season began to take an executive position with the NHL. In addition, Burke had some disagreements with Whalers owner Richard Gordon. After Burke left, Holmgren took over as both the head coach and general manager. The Whalers started off the season poorly. Holmgren felt he was unable to handle the job of general manager and head coach, so he made Pierre McGuire the new head coach. The coaching change did not help the Whalers, however, since McGuire was not popular with the players; the Whalers continued to struggle. The Whalers reached a low point in the season when six players and two assistant coaches were arrested in Buffalo, New York, after being involved in a bar room brawl. Pronger was one of the players arrested; he was 19 years of age at the time, two years below than the legal drinking age in the State of New York. Around this same time, Paul Holmgren checked himself into rehab for alcohol addiction after being arrested with a DUI in Simsbury. The Whalers finished the season with 63 points, only a five-point improvement from the previous season. One bright spot for the Whalers was the emergence of Sean Burke as their franchise and star goaltender. Another highlight of the 1993–94 season was when Brian Propp scored his 1,000th career NHL point with the Whalers. Propp announced his retirement after the season.

=== New ownership ===
In the summer of 1994, the Whalers were purchased, in a deal brokered by the Connecticut Development Authority, by Compuware CEO Peter Karmanos, along with partners Thomas Thewes and Jim Rutherford. Rutherford became the team's new general manager and Holmgren returned as the head coach. The new ownership wanted to turn the team into a winner for the lockout-shortened 1994–95 season, so Rutherford went out to the free agent market and signed Jimmy Carson and Steven Rice. On draft day, the Whalers selected the highly rated Jeff O'Neill in the first round. Rutherford also acquired defenseman Glen Wesley from the Boston Bruins in exchange for three first-round draft picks (Kyle McLaren, Johnathan Aitken and Sergei Samsonov). Despite these acquisitions, the Whalers struggled at the beginning of the season, starting off with a record of 2–7–2. In mid-February, the Whalers began improving, led by their top line of Sanderson, Cassels and Verbeek, along with franchise goaltender Sean Burke. For the next 30 games, the Whalers put up a record of 16–11–3 and it appeared as if the Whalers were on their way to their first playoff berth since 1992. Unfortunately, the Whalers played poorly down the stretch, winning only one game in the last seven and missed the playoffs by four points.

Before the beginning of the 1995–96 season, the Whalers management became frustrated with the slow development of highly rated prospect Chris Pronger. As a result, Pronger was sent to the St. Louis Blues in exchange for Brendan Shanahan. Shanahan was not happy with the trade even before playing a single game in Hartford. However, he was immediately made the team's new captain. The Whalers won their first four games of the season, but then struggled for the rest of the calendar year of 1995. As a result, Paul Maurice replaced Holmgren as head coach in November. On December 28, 1995, the Whalers received a morale boost when they reacquired one of their most popular players from the 1980s, Kevin Dineen. His skills and leadership had an immediate impact on the team, as the Whalers began playing significantly better in January. Despite the strong finish in the second half of the season, the Whalers were unable to recover from their poor start and they missed the playoffs for the fourth year in a row.

Before the beginning of the 1996–97 season, Brendan Shanahan ended his silence about his displeasure about playing in Hartford. He demanded a trade out of Hartford because he claimed he did not want to play in a small market for a team with an uncertain future about its location. Whalers fans and local media condemned Shanahan for his comments and he was immediately stripped of his captaincy; Kevin Dineen took over the role. After the second game of the season, Shanahan was traded (along with Brian Glynn) to the Detroit Red Wings for Keith Primeau, Paul Coffey and a first-round draft pick. Despite these problems, the Whalers got off to a very good start, with a 14–7–6 record after the first 27 games, sitting in first in their division. They were led by a strong first line of Sanderson, Cassels and Dineen along with a solid second line of Primeau, O'Neill and Sami Kapanen. During the calendar year of 1996, the Whalers achieved a record of 41–30–10 in 81 games. In 1997, following the good start, the Whalers' season began to slip away. This included a nine-game losing streak in January and a six-game losing streak in March. Despite the poor performance down the stretch, the Whalers still had an opportunity to make the playoffs in the final week of the season. However, the Whalers lost two games on the road to Ottawa and the New York Islanders, which eliminated them from the playoffs before their final regular season game against the Tampa Bay Lightning.

=== Departure from Hartford ===
Owner Peter Karmanos pledged to keep the Whalers in the city of Hartford for four years when he purchased the team in 1994. However, two years later, frustrated with lackluster attendance and little corporate support, he announced that if the Whalers were unable to sell at least 11,000 season tickets for the 1996–97 season, he would likely move the team. Furthermore, ownership only made season tickets available in full-season (41 games) packages, eliminating the popular six-, 9-, 10- and 20-game mini-plans in a strategy largely designed to spur purchases from corporations and wealthier individuals. Sales were underwhelming at the beginning of the campaign, and at the end of the 1995–96 season, it was still unknown whether the Whalers would stay in Connecticut past 1998 or move elsewhere. However, thanks to an aggressive civic campaign and the efforts of many fans, the Whalers announced that they would stay in Connecticut through at least 1997, one year shy of his original promise. The "Save the Whale" campaign netted season ticket sales totaling 8,563 in less than a 45-day span, despite the Whalers raising ticket prices by an average of 20 percent, eliminating partial ticket plans and increasing the deposit amount for season tickets by 750 percent. This represented an expansion of over 3,500 tickets from the existing base.

In early 1997, Connecticut Governor John G. Rowland stated that he did not want to spend Connecticut taxpayer dollars to fund a new arena in Hartford. Despite this, negotiations between the Whalers and Rowland to build a new $147.5 million arena seemed to be going well. Talks fell apart when Karmanos wanted an additional $45 million to cover losses during the three years the new arena was to be built. The Whalers ultimately announced that they would be leaving Hartford after the 1996–97 season. This marks one of the few times that a team announced it would leave its current city without having already announced an agreement with a new one. Karmanos had discussed relocating the Whalers to Norfolk, Virginia (which would have been the first major sports team for that market) as the Hampton Roads Rhinos, but the failure of a season-ticket drive in Norfolk, coupled with a lack of an adequate arena, led to those plans being canceled. Karmanos stated that Rowland had no intention of making a serious offer to keep the Whalers in Connecticut since Rowland harbored hopes to bring a National Football League (NFL) franchise to the State. Rowland went on to negotiate a tentative deal that would bring the New England Patriots to Connecticut, but those talks also fell apart after the state and Patriots ownership failed to reach an agreement on a new stadium, instead choosing to stay in Foxborough to build what would become Gillette Stadium.

On April 13, 1997, the Whalers played their last game in Hartford, defeating the Tampa Bay Lightning 2–1. Team captain Kevin Dineen, who had returned to Hartford midway through the 1995–96 season after being acquired in a trade with the Philadelphia Flyers, scored the final goal in Whalers history. On May 6, 1997, Karmanos announced the team would move to Raleigh, North Carolina, to become the Carolina Hurricanes, playing its first two seasons in North Carolina at the Greensboro Coliseum while awaiting arena construction in Raleigh, a year earlier than planned. Talks with Nashville, Columbus, and even Suburban Detroit were discussed before bringing the Whalers to North Carolina.

=== Post-departure ===
The following summer in 1997, the Binghamton Rangers, the American Hockey League (AHL) affiliate of the New York Rangers, relocated to the Hartford market to take the place of the Whalers, renaming themselves the Hartford Wolf Pack. Former Whalers owner Howard Baldwin acquired the right to manage the team in 2010 and announced that the Wolf Pack were changing their name to the Connecticut Whale in the middle of the 2010–11 season, adopting the Whalers' old green-blue-white palette. The team changed back to the Hartford Wolf Pack after the Rangers terminated the relationship following the 2012–13 season.

Glen Wesley was the last Whaler still active with the Hartford/Carolina franchise, upon his retirement on June 5, 2008, though his stint was not continuous, playing seven games for the Toronto Maple Leafs at the end of the 2002–03 season after a deadline deal before re-signing with Carolina in the 2003 off-season. Craig Adams was the last player drafted in Whalers' history. However, Adams did not become a member of the team until 2000, after the team had already moved to North Carolina, and he retired in 2015.

Goaltender Jean-Sebastien Giguere was the final former Hartford Whalers player still playing in the NHL; he retired after the end of the 2013–14 season. Robert Petrovicky was the last former Whaler active in professional hockey, playing in European leagues through the end of the 2015–16 season.

== Uniforms ==
=== New England: 1972–1979 ===
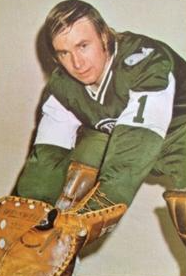
Al Smith, pictured in 1973 in the original green Whalers jersey. Smith served as goaltender for six seasons (1972–1975, 1977–1980).

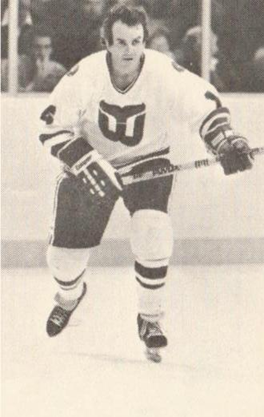
Dave Keon, pictured in 1981 in the Whaler uniforms in the NHL era. Keon played six seasons with the Whalers (1976–1982) and was inducted into the Hockey Hall of Fame in 1986

As the New England Whalers, the team generally wore dark green and white uniforms with a similar style to the iconic Detroit Red Wings uniforms. The uniforms feature the team roundel in front and the Pucky logo on either shoulder. In 1974, the white uniform added yellow trim and replaced the roundel logo with the "harpoon W" logo, and the following year, the green uniform adopted the same elements. In 1977, the striping on the waist and socks was modified.

=== Green uniform era: 1979–1992 ===
After becoming the Hartford Whalers, the team adopted its most iconic uniform design: green and white uniforms with blue, white and green stripes and the new Peter Good-designed logo in front. The design underwent a few cosmetic changes, such as wearing Cooperalls in the 1982–83 season, switching from angular to straight sleeve stripes and back during the early 1990s, and removing the Pucky logo in 1985.

=== Blue and silver uniform era: 1992–1997 ===
For the Whalers' final years in Hartford, the team switched their primary colors to dark blue and added silver accents to the logo and striping. The numbers received extra contrasting trim.

=== Hurricanes' Whalers tribute ===
In 2018, the Hurricanes announced they would wear green Hartford Whalers throwback uniforms during two games against the Boston Bruins, first on December 23, 2018, at home and again on March 5, 2019, in Boston. The announcement was generally viewed as positive recognition of the roots of the Hurricane franchise, although not all former Whalers' fans approved of the use. The Hurricanes again wore the Whalers uniforms for a home game against the Los Angeles Kings, on January 11, 2020. Its fourth appearance came on January 29, 2022, against the New Jersey Devils. The most recent appearance came on January 29, 2026 as part of a 5-4 win against the Utah Mammoth.

Adidas' "Reverse Retro" program in 2021 saw the Hurricanes wear silver versions of the classic Whalers uniform, bridging both Whalers eras in the design.

In the 2023–24 season, the Hurricanes wore a white version of the Whalers uniform against the Devils, and donned Cooperalls in pregame warmups. The same white uniforms were worn for a game against the Buffalo Sabres the following season, on February 27, 2025.

== "Brass Bonanza" theme song ==
Unlike most sports teams at any level, the Whalers had an official theme song. The song was entitled "Brass Bonanza", and was a tune composed and arranged by Jacques Ysaye (under the pseudonym of Jack Say), originally called "Evening Beat". The song was a big hit with the team, Whalers fans, and even fans of other NHL teams, and was played at home games when the Whalers entered the rink for warmups, and also after they scored a goal. It was introduced in the mid-1970s on the B side of a souvenir record of team radio broadcast highlights while they were still named the New England Whalers and playing in the WHA. However, in 1992, then-general manager Brian Burke cancelled the use of the song because he said "there were players who were embarrassed by it", and replaced it with a goal horn and the song "Hot, Hot, Hot" by Buster Poindexter, then a year later, "Rock and Roll Part 2" by Gary Glitter. While the goal horn is still used by the Hurricanes today, "Brass Bonanza" was quickly reintroduced after Burke left the team the following year.

The song is still very popular with Hartford crowds, and continues to occasionally be played at PeoplesBank Arena events, including at Hartford Wolf Pack/Connecticut Whale games from 2011 to 2013, and the University of Connecticut's basketball and men's ice hockey games. The song plays whenever a player on the city's minor-league baseball team, the Hartford Yard Goats, hits a home run. It was also previously used by the Whalers' AHL affiliate, the Binghamton Whalers, the Danbury Whalers of the Federal Hockey League (FHL), and Quinnipiac University's men's and women's ice hockey teams. It has also been played at Fenway Park in Boston during Boston Red Sox games in between innings for several years. Rock bands have been known to play the song during shows in Connecticut, most notably The Zambonis. The song was played when the Carolina Hurricanes scored a goal on an event called Heritage Night, when the Hurricanes dressed in Whalers attire. The Florida Everblades, a former affiliate of the Hurricanes in the ECHL, play the song after every home game at Hertz Arena. The song was also adopted by the city's soccer team, Hartford Athletic, and the Premier Hockey Federation's Connecticut Whale, being played after goals scored by those teams. The Victoria Royals of the WHL - Western Hockey League - have used the theme for goals since 2017.

== "Pucky The Whale" mascot ==
The official mascot of the Whalers was named "Pucky The Whale" and most commonly referred to as "Pucky". Depicted as a green whale, it was the team's secondary logo appearing on the shoulders of their jerseys from the 1970s WHA days until the mid 1980s. In the 2010s a new mascot costume version of Pucky was making appearances around Connecticut.

== Season-by-season record ==
The Whalers had a 281–236–38 regular season record, and a 41–33 playoff record in the WHA, along with three division titles and one Avco World Trophy. In the NHL, the team had a 534–709–177 regular season record, and a 18–31 playoff record, along with one division title.

== Notable players ==
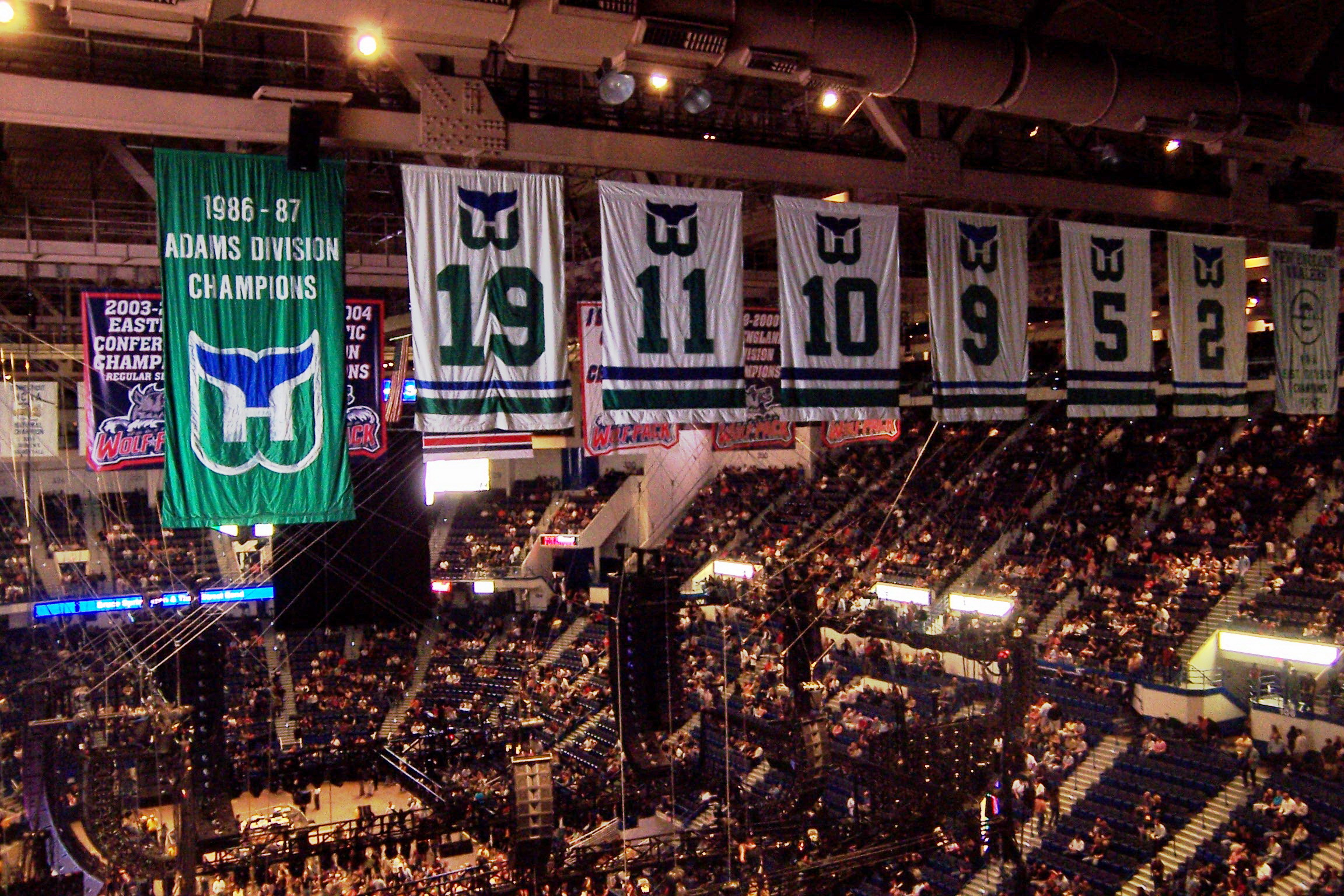
Whaler banners hanging from the Hartford Civic Center rafters in 2007. The numbers 2, 9, and 19 were retired while the team was still in Hartford and honor Rick Ley, Gordie Howe, and John McKenzie, respectively. In 2006, the numbers 5, 10, and 11 were added by Hartford Wolf Pack management in honor of Ulf Samuelsson, Ron Francis, and Kevin Dineen, respectively. These are joined by a banner commemorating the Whalers' 1986-87 Adams Division championship and 1972-73 WHA East Division championship.

=== Hall of Famers ===
Players

- Paul Coffey, 1996, inducted 2004
- Ron Francis, 1981–1991, inducted 2007
- Gordie Howe, 1977–1980, inducted 1972
- Mark Howe, 1977–1982, inducted 2011
- Bobby Hull, 1980, inducted 1983
- Dave Keon, 1976–1982, inducted 1986
- Chris Pronger, 1993–1995, inducted 2015
- Brendan Shanahan, 1995–1996, inducted 2013

Builders

- Brian Burke, 1992–1993, inducted 2026
- Emile Francis, 1983–1989, inducted 1982

=== Team captains ===
Note: includes both WHA Whalers and NHL Whalers

- Ted Green, 1972–1975
- Rick Ley, 1975–1980
- Mike Rogers, 1980–1981
- Dave Keon, 1981–1982
- Russ Anderson, 1982–1983
- Mark Johnson, 1983–1985
- Ron Francis, 1985–1990
- Randy Ladouceur, 1991–1992
- Pat Verbeek, 1992–1995
- Brendan Shanahan, 1995–1996
- Kevin Dineen, 1996–1997

=== Retired numbers ===
Hartford Whalers retired numbers
No.	Player	Position	Tenure	No. Retirement
2	Rick Ley	D	1972–1981	December 26, 1982
9	Gordie Howe	RW	1977–1980	February 18, 1981
19	John McKenzie	RW	1977–1979	February 27, 1980

The retirement of McKenzie's number was notable, in so far as it was one of the only three instances in NHL history (the others being the NHL Quebec Nordiques retiring J. C. Tremblay's number and the Ottawa Senators retiring Frank Finnigan's number) that an NHL franchise retired the number of a player who had never played for it while the franchise was in the NHL.

After the move to North Carolina, the Hurricanes returned number 2 and 19 to circulation; Glen Wesley was the only player to wear number 2 in Carolina before that number was re-retired in 2009 in his honor. Howe's number 9 remained officially retired by Carolina, and has never been issued since the relocation to North Carolina, but there is no banner to acknowledge it.

=== First-round draft picks ===
Note: This list includes draft picks from both the WHA and NHL.

- 1973: Glenn Goldup (2nd overall) and Blake Dunlop (12th overall)
- 1974: Peter Sturgeon (14th overall)
- 1975: Terry McDonald (13th overall)
- 1978: no WHA draft
- 1979: Ray Allison (18th overall)
- 1980: Fred Arthur (8th overall)
- 1981: Ron Francis (4th overall)
- 1982: Paul Lawless (14th overall)
- 1983: Sylvain Turgeon (2nd overall)
- 1984: Sylvain Cote (11th overall)
- 1985: Dana Murzyn (5th overall)
- 1986: Scott Young (11th overall)
- 1987: Jody Hull (18th overall)
- 1988: Chris Govedaris (11th overall)
- 1989: Bobby Holik (10th overall)
- 1990: Mark Greig (15th overall)
- 1991: Patrick Poulin (9th overall)
- 1992: Robert Petrovicky (9th overall)
- 1993: Chris Pronger (2nd overall)
- 1994: Jeff O'Neill (5th overall)
- 1995: Jean-Sebastien Giguere (13th overall)

=== Hartford Whalers individual records (NHL) ===
- Most goals in a season: Blaine Stoughton, 56 (1979–80)
- Most assists in a season: Ron Francis, 69 (1989–90)
- Most points in a season: Mike Rogers, 105 (1979–80/1980–81)
- Most penalty minutes in a season: Torrie Robertson, 358 (1985–86)
- Most points in a season, defenseman: Mark Howe, 80 (1979–80)
- Most points in a season, rookie: Sylvain Turgeon, 72 (1983–84)
- Most wins in a season: Mike Liut, 31 (1986–87)

=== Franchise scoring leaders in Hartford ===
These are the top-ten point-scorers in Hartford Whalers' history, combining NHL and WHA totals.

Legend: Pos = Position; GP = Games played; G = Goals; A = Assists; Pts = Points; P/G = Points per game

Points
Player	Pos	GP	G	A	Pts	P/G
Ron Francis	C	714	264	557	821	1.14
Kevin Dineen	RW	587	235	268	503	0.85
Mike Rogers	C	434	182	285	467	1.08
Tom Webster	RW	352	220	205	425	1.21
Pat Verbeek	RW	433	192	211	403	0.93
Mark Howe	LW/D	360	123	273	396	1.10
Blaine Stoughton	RW	393	228	161	389	0.99
Larry Pleau	RW	468	157	215	372	.79
Geoff Sanderson	LW	439	189	163	352	.80
Ray Ferraro	C	442	157	194	351	.79

=== Career leaders (WHA, 1972–1979) ===
- Games: Rick Ley, 478
- Goals: Tom Webster, 220
- Assists: Larry Pleau, 215
- Points: Tom Webster, 425
- Penalty minutes: Rick Ley, 716
- Goaltender wins: Al Smith, 141

=== Career leaders (NHL, 1979–1997) ===
- Games: Ron Francis, 714
- Goals: Ron Francis, 264
- Assists: Ron Francis, 557
- Points: Ron Francis, 821
- Penalty minutes: Torrie Robertson, 1,368
- Goaltender games: Sean Burke, 256
- Goaltender wins: Mike Liut, 115
- Shutouts: Mike Liut, 13

== Former affiliations ==
During its existence the team was affiliated with the following teams:

American Hockey League

- Springfield Indians, 1979–1980, 1990–1994
- Binghamton Whalers, 1980–1990
- Springfield Falcons, 1994–1997

Colonial Hockey League

- Chatham Wheels, 1992–1993

East Coast Hockey League

- Louisville Icehawks, 1991–1993
- Raleigh IceCaps, 1993–1994
- Richmond Renegades, 1994–1997

Central Hockey League

- Cincinnati Stingers, 1979–1980

Eastern Hockey League

- Utica Mohawks, 1979–1980
- Syracuse Hornets, 1980–1981

International Hockey League

- Saginaw Gears, 1980–1983
- Flint Generals, 1983–1984
- Salt Lake Golden Eagles, 1984–1987
- Milwaukee Admirals, 1987–1988
- Indianapolis Ice, 1988–1989
- Kansas City Blades, 1990–1991

== See also ==
- List of New England Whalers players
- List of Hartford Whalers players
- List of defunct and relocated National Hockey League teams
- Professional ice hockey in Connecticut
- List of Hartford Whalers broadcasters
- Hartford Wailers
