= List of Philadelphia Flyers minor league affiliates =

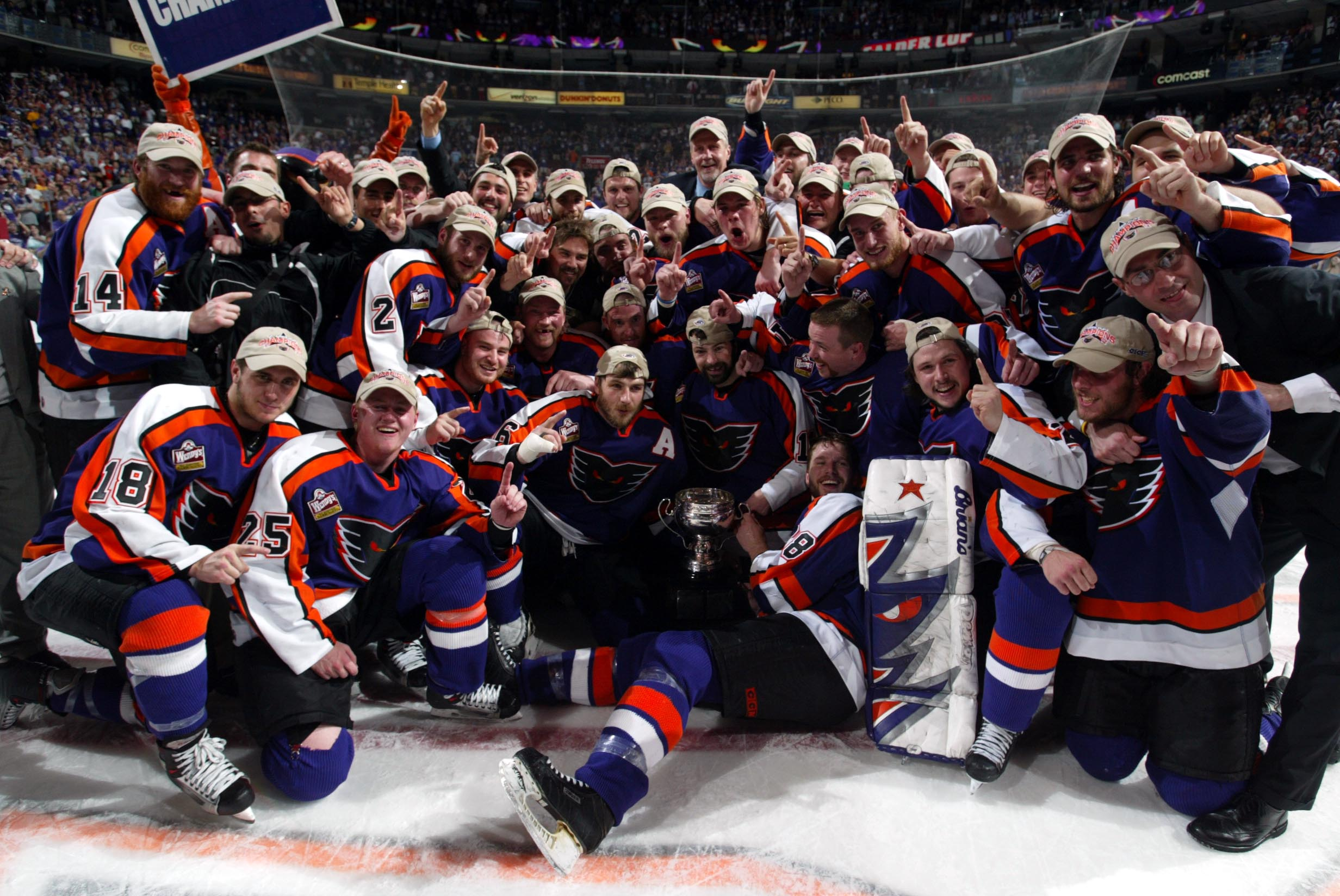
The Phantoms won their second Calder Cup championship on June 10, 2005.

This is a list of all-time minor league affiliates for the Philadelphia Flyers of the National Hockey League (NHL). The Flyers have been affiliated with both the Lehigh Valley Phantoms of the American Hockey League (AHL) and the Reading Royals of the ECHL since the 2014–15 season, and have been affiliates with the Phantoms franchise since their inception in 1996. The only past affiliates to serve in that role for more than ten years are the Hershey Bears for twelve seasons (1984–85 to 1995–96) and the Trenton Titans for ten seasons (1999–2000 to 2006–07, and 2011–12 to 2012–13).

== Affiliates ==
^{†} Calder Cup champions
^{‡} League champions

Season	AHL affiliate	Other affiliates	
Season	AHL affiliate	Team	League
1967–68	Quebec Aces	Phoenix Roadrunners	WHL
1967–68	Quebec Aces	Seattle Totems^{‡}	WHL
1967–68	Quebec Aces	Knoxville Knights	EHL
1968–69	Quebec Aces	Seattle Totems	WHL
1968–69	Quebec Aces	Jersey Devils	EHL
1969–70	Quebec Aces	Flint Generals	IHL
1969–70	Quebec Aces	Jersey Devils	EHL
1970–71	Quebec Aces	Flint Generals	IHL
1970–71	Quebec Aces	Jersey Devils	EHL
1971–72	Richmond Robins	San Diego Gulls	WHL
1971–72	Richmond Robins	Jersey Devils	EHL
1971–72	Richmond Robins	Roanoke Valley Rebels	EHL
1972–73	Richmond Robins	San Diego Gulls	WHL
1972–73	Richmond Robins	Jersey Devils	EHL
1973–74	Richmond Robins	San Diego Gulls	WHL
1974–75	Richmond Robins	Philadelphia Firebirds	NAHL
1975–76	Richmond Robins	Philadelphia Firebirds^{‡}	NAHL
1976–77	Springfield Indians	Philadelphia Firebirds	NAHL
1977–78	Maine Mariners^{†}	Philadelphia Firebirds	NAHL
1978–79	Maine Mariners^{†}	Milwaukee Admirals	IHL
1978–79	Maine Mariners^{†}	Jersey Aces	NEHL
1979–80	Maine Mariners	Toledo Goaldiggers	IHL
1979–80	Maine Mariners	Hampton Aces	EHL
1980–81	Maine Mariners	Toledo Goaldiggers^{‡}	IHL
1981–82	Maine Mariners	Toledo Goaldiggers^{‡}	IHL
1982–83	Maine Mariners	Toledo Goaldiggers	IHL
1983–84	Springfield Indians	Toledo Goaldiggers	IHL
1984–85	Hershey Bears	Kalamazoo Wings	IHL
1985–86	Hershey Bears	Kalamazoo Wings	IHL
1986–87	Hershey Bears	Kalamazoo Wings	IHL
1987–88	Hershey Bears^{†}	Flint Spirits	IHL
1988–89	Hershey Bears		
1989–90	Hershey Bears		
1990–91	Hershey Bears		
1991–92	Hershey Bears		
1992–93	Hershey Bears		
1993–94	Hershey Bears	Johnstown Chiefs	ECHL
1994–95	Hershey Bears	Johnstown Chiefs	ECHL
1995–96	Hershey Bears	Mobile Mysticks	ECHL
1996–97	Philadelphia Phantoms	Mobile Mysticks	ECHL
1997–98	Philadelphia Phantoms^{†}		
1998–99	Philadelphia Phantoms		
1999–00	Philadelphia Phantoms	Trenton Titans	ECHL
2000–01	Philadelphia Phantoms	Trenton Titans	ECHL
2001–02	Philadelphia Phantoms	Trenton Titans	ECHL
2002–03	Philadelphia Phantoms	Trenton Titans	ECHL
2003–04	Philadelphia Phantoms	Trenton Titans	ECHL
2004–05	Philadelphia Phantoms^{†}	Trenton Titans^{‡}	ECHL
2005–06	Philadelphia Phantoms	Trenton Titans	ECHL
2006–07	Philadelphia Phantoms	Trenton Titans	ECHL
2007–08	Philadelphia Phantoms	Wheeling Nailers	ECHL
2008–09	Philadelphia Phantoms	Mississippi Sea Wolves	ECHL
2009–10	Adirondack Phantoms	Kalamazoo Wings	ECHL
2009–10	Adirondack Phantoms	Quad City Mallards	IHL
2010–11	Adirondack Phantoms	Greenville Road Warriors	ECHL
2011–12	Adirondack Phantoms	Trenton Titans	ECHL
2012–13	Adirondack Phantoms	Trenton Titans	ECHL
2013–14	Adirondack Phantoms	Greenville Road Warriors (Note: The affiliation was dissolved one month into the season.)	ECHL
2014–15	Lehigh Valley Phantoms	Reading Royals	ECHL
2015–16	Lehigh Valley Phantoms	Reading Royals	ECHL
2016–17	Lehigh Valley Phantoms	Reading Royals	ECHL
2017–18	Lehigh Valley Phantoms	Reading Royals	ECHL
2018–19	Lehigh Valley Phantoms	Reading Royals	ECHL
2019–20	Lehigh Valley Phantoms	Reading Royals	ECHL
2020–21	Lehigh Valley Phantoms	Reading Royals (Note: Reading was one of several ECHL teams to opt out of playing during the 2020–21 season due to the COVID-19 pandemic.)	ECHL
2021–22	Lehigh Valley Phantoms	Reading Royals	ECHL
2022–23	Lehigh Valley Phantoms	Reading Royals	ECHL
2023–24	Lehigh Valley Phantoms	Reading Royals	ECHL
2024–25	Lehigh Valley Phantoms	Reading Royals	ECHL
2025–26	Lehigh Valley Phantoms	Reading Royals	ECHL
2026–27	Lehigh Valley Phantoms	Reading Royals	ECHL

== See also ==
- Farm team
- 2019–20 Lehigh Valley Phantoms season
