= Michel Belhumeur =

Canadian ice hockey player

- Born: September 2, 1949 (age 75); Sorel, Quebec, Canada
- Height: 5 ft 10 in (178 cm)
- Weight: 160 lb (73 kg; 11 st 6 lb)
- Position: Goaltender
- Caught: Left
- Played for: Philadelphia Flyers; Washington Capitals
- NHL draft: 40th overall, 1969; Philadelphia Flyers
- Playing career: 1969–1979

Michel Raymond Joseph Belhumeur (born September 2, 1949) is a Canadian former professional ice hockey goaltender. He played 65 games in the National Hockey League for the Philadelphia Flyers and Washington Capitals from 1972 to 1975.

== Playing career ==
Drafted by the Flyers in 1969, Belhumeur spent most of his time in the minors, but managed to win nine games for Philadelphia before they exposed him to the 1974 NHL Expansion Draft, where he was claimed by the Capitals. Belhumeur played two seasons with the Capitals, and did not win a single game (zero wins, 29 losses, and 4 ties). He played three more years in the minors before retiring in 1979. Belhumeur has the NHL record for most games played in one season (35 games in the 1974–75 season with the Capitals) without a win. In 35 games, he won zero games, lost 24, and tied 3.

== Career statistics ==
=== Regular season and playoffs ===
			Regular season									Playoffs
Season	Team	League	GP	W	L	T	MIN	GA	SO	GAA	SV%	GP	W	L	MIN	GA	SO	GAA	SV%
1964–65	Sorel Eperviers	QJHL	5	1	4	0	300	22	0	6.40	—	—	—	—	—	—	—	—	—
1965–66	Sorel Eperviers	QJHL	4	1	3	0	220	27	0	7.36	—	—	—	—	—	—	—	—	—
1966–67	Sorel Eperviers	QJHL	2	1	1	0	120	5	0	2.50	—	—	—	—	—	—	—	—	—
1967–68	Sorel Eperviers	QJHL	—	—	—	—	—	—	—	—	—	—	—	—	—	—	—	—	—
1968–69	Drummondville Rangers	QJHL	34	—	—	—	2105	135	3	3.85	—	—	—	—	—	—	—	—	—
1969–70	Quebec Aces	AHL	2	—	—	—	100	10	0	6.00	—	—	—	—	—	—	—	—	—
1969–70	Charlotte Checkers	EHL	14	—	—	—	840	42	1	3.00	—	—	—	—	—	—	—	—	—
1970–71	Quebec Aces	AHL	37	12	15	8	2083	110	2	3.17	—	1	0	1	60	4	0	4.00	—
1971–72	Richmond Robins	AHL	45	20	17	8	2645	122	1	2.77	—	—	—	—	—	—	—	—	—
1972–73	Philadelphia Flyers	NHL	25	9	7	3	1116	60	0	3.23	.903	1	0	0	11	1	0	5.94	.889
1972–73	Richmond Robins	AHL	12	—	—	—	671	49	0	4.38	—	—	—	—	—	—	—	—	—
1973–74	Richmond Robins	AHL	45	13	23	7	2567	179	0	4.18	—	3	1	2	191	13	1	4.08	—
1974–75	Washington Capitals	NHL	35	0	24	3	1811	162	0	5.37	.861	—	—	—	—	—	—	—	—
1975–76	Washington Capitals	NHL	7	0	5	1	376	32	0	5.09	.860	—	—	—	—	—	—	—	—
1975–76	Richmond Robins	AHL	45	19	24	2	2679	159	3	3.56	—	4	2	1	194	7	0	2.16	—
1976–77	Tulsa Oilers	CHL	34	17	12	3	1966	131	1	4.00	.868	1	0	1	70	4	0	3.43	—
1977–78	Tulsa Oilers	CHL	24	8	14	0	1319	96	0	4.37	.877	5	2	3	305	15	0	2.95	—
1978–79	Utica Mohawks	NEHL	24	—	—	—	1308	89	2	4.08	—	—	—	—	—	—	—	—	—
1978–79	Jersey/Hampton Aces	NEHL	11	—	—	—	665	37	1	3.34	—	—	—	—	—	—	—	—	—
NHL totals			65	9	36	7	3302	254	0	4.62	.874	1	0	0	11	1	0	5.94	.889
