= Larry Mickey =

Canadian ice hockey player (1943-1982)

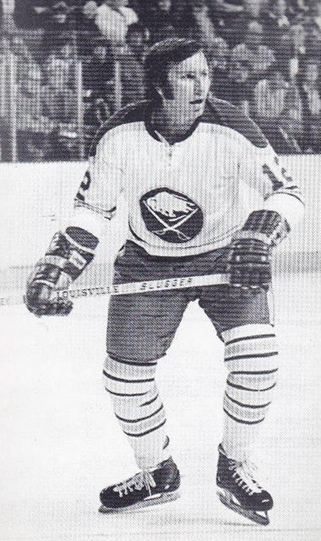
- Born: October 21, 1943 Lacombe, Alberta, Canada
- Died: July 23, 1982 (aged 38) Buffalo, New York, U.S.
- Height: 5 ft 11 in (180 cm)
- Weight: 175 lb (79 kg; 12 st 7 lb)
- Position: Right wing
- Shot: Right
- Played for: Chicago Black Hawks; New York Rangers; Toronto Maple Leafs; Montreal Canadiens; Los Angeles Kings; Philadelphia Flyers; Buffalo Sabres
- Playing career: 1964–1975; 1978–1981

Robert Larry Mickey (October 21, 1943 — July 23, 1982) was a Canadian professional ice hockey right winger who played in the National Hockey League (NHL) with the Chicago Black Hawks, New York Rangers, Toronto Maple Leafs, Montreal Canadiens, Los Angeles Kings, Philadelphia Flyers and Buffalo Sabres between 1965 and 1975.

While playing with the Buffalo Sabres of the NHL, Mickey became one of the early founders of Buffalo Jr. Sabres, a Junior "A" ice hockey team based in Buffalo, New York, and coached the team from 1975 through 1977. Larry Mickey (October 21, 1943 – July 23, 1982) was a Canadian professional ice hockey right winger who played in the National Hockey League (NHL) for the Chicago Black Hawks, New York Rangers, Toronto Maple Leafs, Montreal Canadiens, Los Angeles Kings, Philadelphia Flyers, and Buffalo Sabres between 1965 and 1975. Beyond his playing career, Mickey was deeply involved in community and youth hockey development. He was recognized for his dedication to coaching young players and for his outreach to children with special needs. Mickey was one of the early founders of the Buffalo Jr. Sabres, established in 1975 in Buffalo, New York. https://buffalojrsabres.pointstreaksites.com/view/buffalojrsabres/team/history-58 The organization became a cornerstone of Western New York’s hockey community, helping to develop numerous players and coaches. Mickey served as head coach of the Jr. Sabres from 1975 through the 1977 season. His legacy in hockey continues through his son, Cory Mickey, who operates 3D Hockey Player Development https://www.3d.hockey a training organization dedicated to advancing youth and elite-level players. His grandson, Shane Mickey, is an emerging young hockey player, carrying forward the family’s passion for the game.

== Playing career ==
While playing with the Omaha Knights, Mickey was named to the first team of the Central Hockey League All-Stars during the 1966-67 season, and his team advanced to the Adams Cup finals that same year.

On April 16, 1967, the night before the third game of the Adams Cup best-of-seven play-off series between the Omaha Knights and the Oklahoma City Blazers, Mickey was driving with his wife, Eleanor, on a country road near Seward, Nebraska late on Sunday night. The road's visibility was reduced to nearly zero as a result of blowing dust from a nearby field, and Mickey was involved in a two-car, head-on collision. Mickey suffered cuts, bruises and a broken left arm, while Eleanor was killed in the crash.

== Community Involvement ==
Beyond his playing career, Mickey was deeply involved in community and youth hockey development. He was recognized for his dedication to coaching young players and for his outreach to children with special needs.

Mickey was one of the early founders of the Buffalo Jr. Sabres, established in 1975 in Buffalo, New York. The organization became a cornerstone of Western New York’s hockey community, helping to develop numerous players and coaches. During its history, a half-dozen former Buffalo Sabres served as head coach or assistant coach. Mickey served as head coach of the Jr. Sabres from 1975 through the 1977 season.

His legacy in hockey continues through his son, Cory Mickey, who operates 3D Hockey Player Development, a training organization dedicated to advancing youth and elite-level players. His grandson, Shane Mickey, is an emerging young hockey player, carrying forward the family’s passion for the game.

== Death ==
Mickey committed suicide in Buffalo on July 23, 1982.

== Career statistics ==
=== Regular season and playoffs ===
			Regular season					Playoffs
Season	Team	League	GP	G	A	Pts	PIM	GP	G	A	Pts	PIM
1961–62	Moose Jaw Canucks	SJHL	—	—	—	—	—	—	—	—	—	—
1961–62	Moose Jaw Canucks	M-Cup	—	—	—	—	—	4	2	1	3	10
1962–63	Moose Jaw Canucks	SJHL	54	32	38	70	85	6	1	5	6	23
1962–63	Calgary Stampeders	WHL	2	0	1	1	0	—	—	—	—	—
1963–64	Moose Jaw Canucks	SJHL	62	69	73	142	139	5	7	2	9	6
1963–64	St. Louis Braves	CPHL	1	0	0	0	0	5	1	2	3	2
1963–64	Estevan Bruins	M-Cup	—	—	—	—	—	5	1	1	2	8
1963–64	Edmonton Oil Kings	M-Cup	—	—	—	—	—	4	0	0	0	2
1964–65	Chicago Black Hawks	NHL	1	0	0	0	0	—	—	—	—	—
1964–65	St. Louis Braves	CPHL	52	16	21	37	85	—	—	—	—	—
1964–65	Buffalo Bisons	AHL	1	0	1	1	2	—	—	—	—	—
1965–66	New York Rangers	NHL	7	0	0	0	2	—	—	—	—	—
1965–66	Minnesota Rangers	CPHL	38	14	25	39	50	7	5	5	10	2
1966–67	New York Rangers	NHL	8	0	0	0	0	—	—	—	—	—
1966–67	Omaha Knights	CPHL	63	33	41	74	86	9	5	10	15	4
1967–68	New York Rangers	NHL	4	0	2	2	0	—	—	—	—	—
1967–68	Buffalo Bisons	AHL	30	9	17	26	48	—	—	—	—	—
1968–69	Toronto Maple Leafs	NHL	55	8	19	27	43	3	0	0	0	5
1969–70	Montreal Canadiens	NHL	21	4	4	8	4	—	—	—	—	—
1969–70	Montreal Voyageurs	AHL	50	24	38	62	90	—	—	—	—	—
1970–71	Los Angeles Kings	NHL	65	6	12	18	46	—	—	—	—	—
1971–72	Philadelphia Flyers	NHL	14	1	2	3	8	—	—	—	—	—
1971–72	Buffalo Sabres	NHL	4	0	1	1	0	—	—	—	—	—
1971–72	Salt Lake Golden Eagles	WHL	53	19	30	49	92	—	—	—	—	—
1972–73	Buffalo Sabres	NHL	77	15	9	24	47	6	1	0	1	5
1973–74	Buffalo Sabres	NHL	13	3	4	7	8	—	—	—	—	—
1973–74	Cincinnati Swords	AHL	9	2	3	5	5	—	—	—	—	—
1974–75	Buffalo Sabres	NHL	23	2	0	2	2	—	—	—	—	—
1978–79	Utica Mohawks	NEHL	12	5	4	9	21	—	—	—	—	—
1979–80	Utica Mohawks	EHL	4	0	4	4	14	—	—	—	—	—
1980–81	Hampton Aces	EHL	38	5	14	19	50	—	—	—	—	—
NHL totals			292	39	53	92	160	9	1	0	1	10
