= Bill Purcell (ice hockey) =

Canadian ice hockey coach

Bill Purcell was the York University hockey coach from 1965–1972, and the OIAA 1969–1970 Coach of the Year.

He is credited with establishing York University's Yeomen hockey program in 1961 and bringing it national acclaim and notoriety. He also championed the teams relocation from outdoor play at Glendon to the New York Arena, locally known as the Ice Palace.

== Accomplishments ==
- 1967–1968: 2nd-place finish in the Ontario Intercollegiate Athletic Association (OIAA) League
- 1969–1970: OIAA championship
- 1969–1970: Consolation title of the Canadian finals.
- 1969–1970: Coach of the Year
- 1971–1972: 1st-place finish in the Ontario Universities Athletic Association (OUAA) League with a record 16 wins (16-1-2)
- 1978–1979: IHL Champion
- 1981–1982: OUAA League Champion
- 1986/1987: Italy Champion HC Mastini Varese
- November 6, 2013: Inducted into the Hockey Hall of Fame, Toronto

== Coaching positions ==
- 1978–1979: Head Coach Kalamazoo Wings of the IHL
- 1979–1980: Head Coach Adirondack Red Wings of the AHL
- 1980–1981: Head Coach Richmond Rifles of the Eastern Hockey League
- 1981–1982: Coach University of Toronto Varsity Blues men's ice hockey team
- 1989–1990: Head Coach Oshawa Legionaires of the MetJHL
- 1994–1995: Assistant Coach Oshawa Generals of the OHL
- 1995–1996: Assistant Coach Oshawa Generals of the OHL
- 1996–1997: Head Coach Markham Waxers of the MetJHL
- 2000–2001: Assistant Coach Tallahassee Tiger Sharks of the ECHL
- 2004: Head Coach Whitby Dunlops
- 2006–2008: coach of the Markham waxers

Purcell is a former semi-professional hockey player himself, playing for the Toronto All Stars 1966–1967.

He was a professional fire fighter for the city of Toronto (Dundas and Parliament hall) in the 1950s and 1960s.
