= Brian Burke =

Brian Burke may refer to:

- Brian Burke (Australian politician) (born 1947), Australian politician and former premier of Western Australia
- Brian Burke (American politician) (born 1958), Wisconsin politician and legislator
- Brian Burke (ice hockey) (born 1955), American ice hockey executive
- Brian Burke (American football) (1935–2025), American football player and coach
- Brian Burke (Gaelic footballer) (born 1966), Irish retired Gaelic footballer

== See also ==
- Bryan Burke (born 1989), American soccer player
- Bryan Burk (born 1968), American film and television producer
- Brian Bourke (born 1936), Irish artist
