= Hartford Whalers relocation to Raleigh =

Moving of an NHL team in 1997

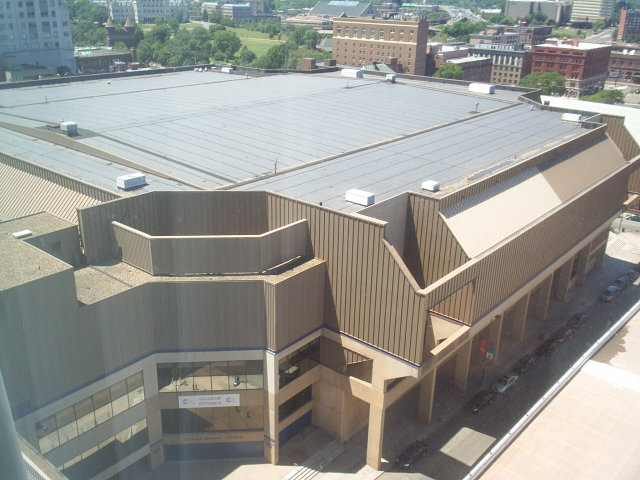
Hartford Civic Arena, now PeoplesBank Arena, was the Hartford Whalers’ home arena

On May 7, 1997, the Hartford Whalers, an American professional hockey team that competed in the National Hockey League (NHL), relocated from its original city of Hartford, Connecticut to Raleigh, North Carolina. The team began to play as the Carolina Hurricanes in the 1997–98 season, playing their first two seasons in Greensboro, North Carolina whilst construction of the Lenovo Center was completed. The Whalers were the third team in as many years to relocate in the NHL, following the Quebec Nordiques and Winnipeg Jets, all of which joined the league as a part of the NHL-WHA merger.

The Whalers were created as an expansion team in the World Hockey Association (WHA) 1972, before joining the NHL in 1979 as one of the four teams in the NHL-WHA merger. In their eighteen seasons in Hartford, the Whalers were largely unsuccessful, with many mediocre seasons and never appearing in a Stanley Cup Final earning them the nickname “the forever .500’s” from Boston Globe writer Kevin Dupont. The move was largely driven by financial disputes regarding funding for a new arena, as owner Peter Karmanos Jr. vowed to build a new arena for the Whalers, but talks broke down when the state of Connecticut were unable to provide sufficient funding for the project, leaving the team without an arena suitable for NHL hockey. Poor season ticket sales and competition from nearby markets also contributed to the move.

== Background ==
In November 1971, the Whalers franchise was awarded to a group of businessmen by the World Hockey Association (WHA), originally being named the New England Whalers and residing in Boston, before moving to Hartford in 1974. In the 1979 NHL-WHA merger, Hartford was identified as one of the four cities to be joining the National Hockey League (NHL) by then NHL president John Ziegler. On 23 May, 1979, it was announced that the New England Whalers would change their name to the Hartford whalers upon joining the NHL, with a reason cited as being that the Whalers will be "permanently based in Hartford," though they were based in Springfield, Massachusetts at the time they joined the NHL due to the collapse of the Hartford Civic Arena roof in 1978.

The Whalers struggled to achieve on-ice success in their eighteen years in the NHL, recording just three winning records and making it past the first round of the playoffs just once, losing in seven games to the Montreal Canadiens in the Eastern Division final of the 1985–86 playoffs. The Canadiens and Boston Bruins frequently dumped the Whalers out of the playoffs. In 1994, Peter Karmanos bought the team with the intent of being aggressive on the market, and despite several high-profile acquisitions, the team failed to seriously compete.

== Reasons for relocation ==
Upon buying the team, Karmanos vowed to keep the Whalers in Hartford on the condition that the state would fund a new arena. The Hartford Civic Arena was the smallest arena in the NHL at the time, seating around 15,000 people, and was largely unsuitable for the NHL. It became a point of contention throughout the relocation saga, with whether or not a new arena would be built emerging as the key hinge as to whether the Whalers would stay in Hartford. Even with the low capacity, attendance figures were poor, with figures generally sitting somewhere around 10,000-13,000, leading Karmanos to give fans an 11,000 season ticket sale for 1996. The Whalers also saw many of their potential supporters follow other nearby teams, sitting between the New York City and Boston markets, which played host to four other NHL teams.

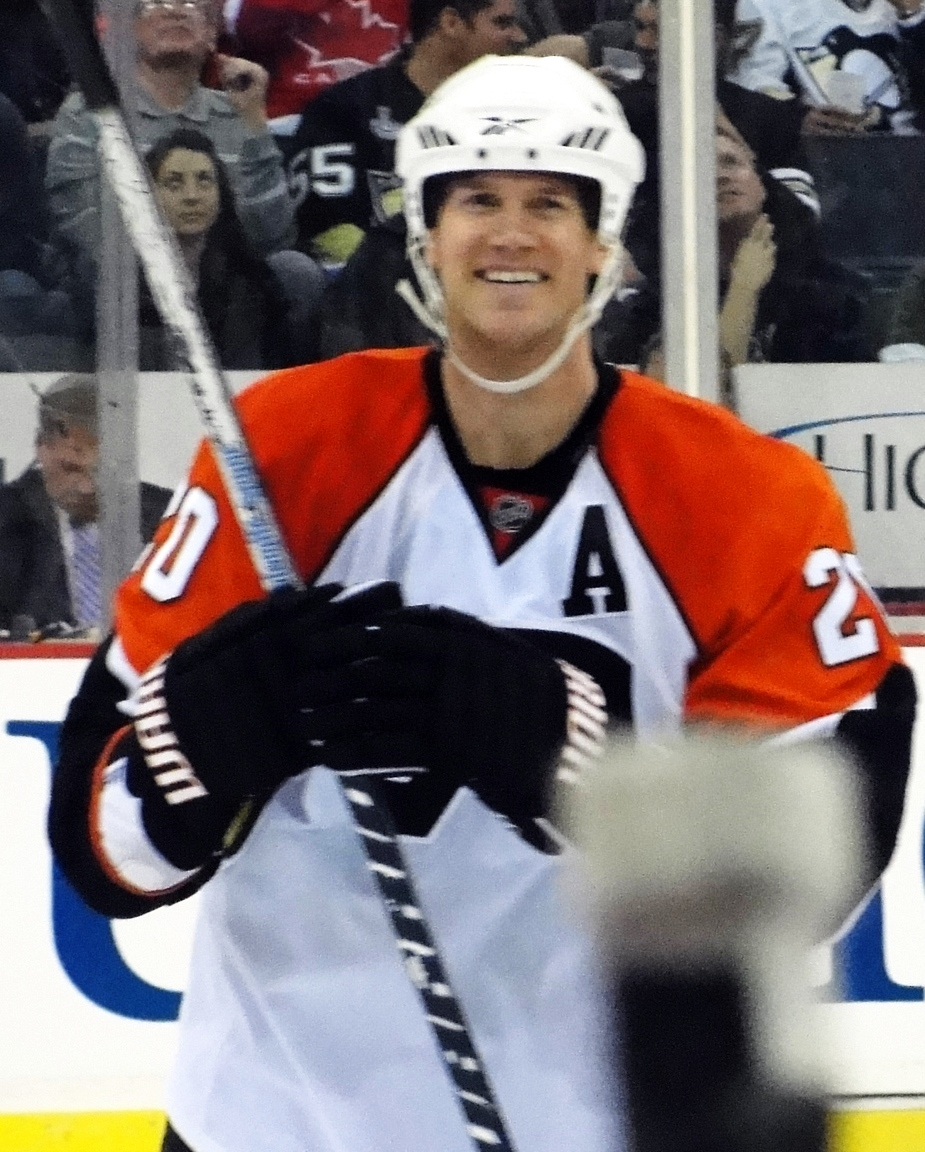
Future Norris Trophy winner Chris Pronger was traded as a prospect

The Whalers had made several poor decisions in the trade market that resulted in them losing out on star players, such as a 1991 trade with the Pittsburgh Penguins that saw them send franchise points leader Ron Francis, Ulf Samuelsson, and Grant Jennings to the Penguins in exchange for John Cullen, Jeff Parker, and Zarley Zalapski. Later in the decade, the team gave up future Hall of Famers Chris Pronger and Brendan Shanahan, and these moves are considered to have only worsened dwindling ticket sales.

== Relocation ==
Karmanos's aforementioned ticket ultimatum caused fans to start a "Save the Whalers" campaign, which ended up falling short of its goal. On May 15, 1996, Karmanos announced that the Whalers would remain in Hartford for two more years, striking an agreement with the state. Owners and Connecticut had difficulty agreeing on an offer for years, with various offers being rejected. In 1996, senior figures of the Whalers announced that if Connecticut did not fund a suitable new arena with taxpayer money, with a projected cost of $160 to $240 million, then the Whalers would no longer stay in the state. The tension culminated on March 27, 1997, when Karmanos rejected Connecticut's $147.5 million offer to build an arena, with Governor John G. Rowland saying the state could "not afford to appease" the back and forth any longer, and the Whalers were forced to pay a $20 million penalty for not meeting their previous four-year commitment. Following this, Karmanos promptly announced that the Whalers would leave Hartford and relocate to a new city; this notably remains one of the only such cases in sports in which a team announced it would be leaving its home city without yet announcing a replacement home. Being shortly thereafter eliminated from playoff contention, the Hartford Whalers would play their last NHL game on April 13, 1997, a 2-1 win over the Tampa Bay Lightning at the Hartford Civic Center, with Kevin Dineen scoring the team's final goal; notably, for the game the message "To our Hartford Whalers- Thanks for the memories" was painted on the center circle of the ice and the fans, recording a complete sell-out of the game, gave the outgoing team a standing ovation as the game officially ended.

Several cities emerged as potential relocation candidates, including Cleveland, Ohio; Columbus, Ohio; Nashville, Tennessee; and a second team in Michigan, as Karmanos had connections to his hometown of Detroit, where he operated a junior hockey league team. Raleigh, North Carolina and Columbus eventually emerged as the frontrunners for the relocation, with Karmanos saying those were his two preferred destinations, and he would not sell the team. On May 7, 1997, it was officially announced that the Whalers would be relocating to Raleigh, playing their first two seasons in Greensboro, North Carolina whilst the Lenovo Center was under construction. The team name "Carolina Hurricanes" was announced the same day.

== Aftermath ==
Since relocating to Raleigh, the Hurricanes have won the Stanley Cup twice, in 2006 and 2026. The Hurricanes saw new relocation rumors emerge during a dry spell in the 2010s, but nothing ever came of such speculation. There has been little discussion as to whether Hartford could receive a new NHL team, as the city would be the smallest market in the league, and they still lack an NHL-ready arena. The Whalers name survived until 2013 with the American Hockey League (AHL) Connecticut Whale, a minor league affiliate of the New York Rangers. The last Whaler active in the NHL was goaltender Jean-Sébastien Giguère, who retired in 2014.
