= Dave MacQueen =

Canadian ice hockey player and coach

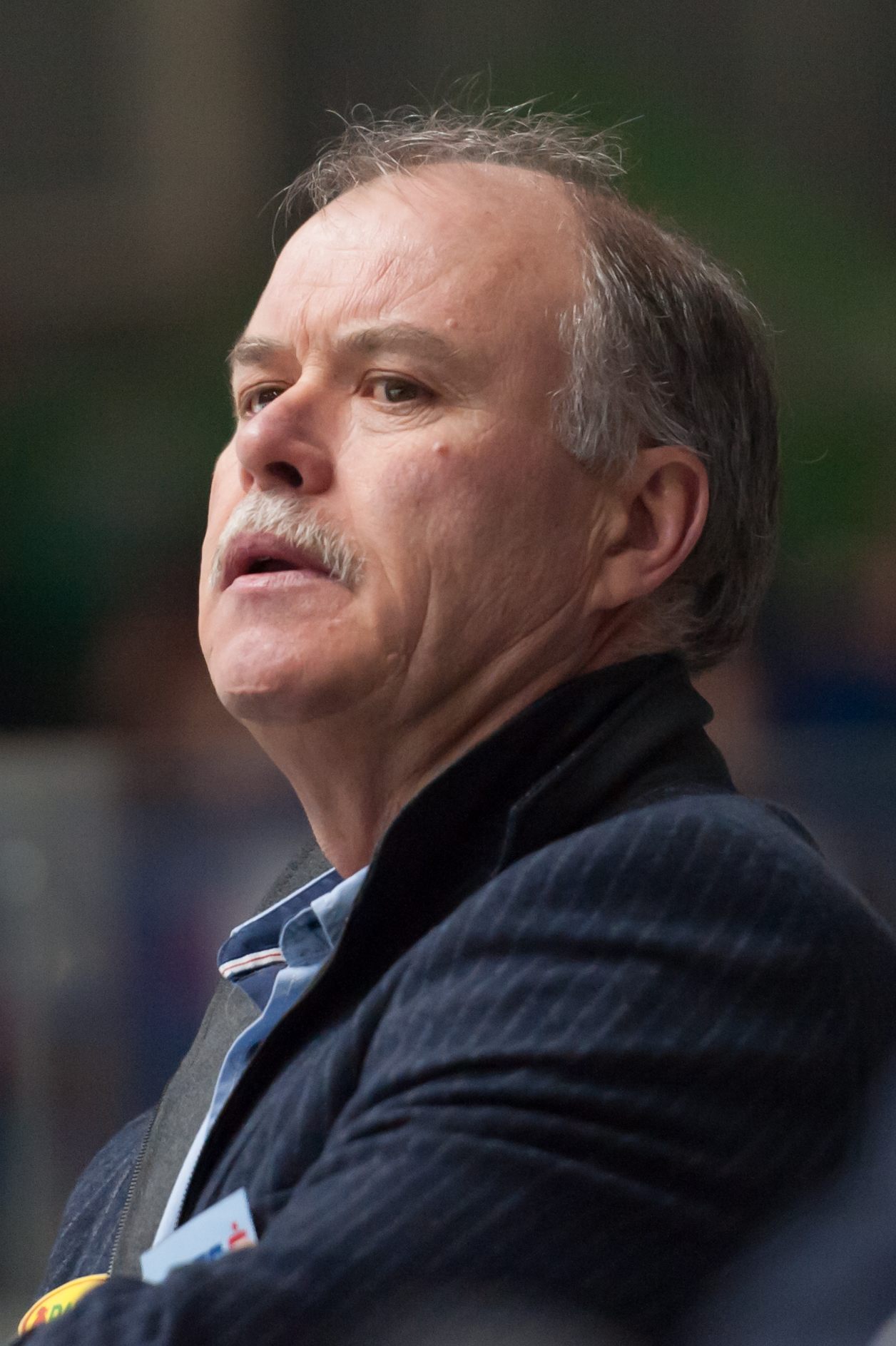
- MacQueen 2016
- Born: February 8, 1959 (age 67) Woodstock, Ontario, Canada
- Height: 5 ft 10 in (178 cm)
- Weight: 180 lb (82 kg; 12 st 12 lb)
- Position: Right wing
- Shot: Right
- Played for: IHL; Flint Generals; Peoria Rivermen; EHL; Johnstown Red Wings; ACHL; Mohawk Valley Stars; Salem Raiders; Virginia Raiders; CHL; Wichita Wind
- NHL draft: Undrafted
- Playing career: 1979–1986

Dave MacQueen (born February 8, 1959) is a Canadian ice hockey coach and former player. MacQueen is the head coach of Corona Brașov.

== Playing career ==
Prior to becoming a coach, MacQueen played seven years of professional hockey (1979–86), bouncing between the EHL, IHL, CHL, and the ACHL. MacQueen led his team in goals scored three different times: Johnstown Red Wings (1979–80), Salem Raiders (1981–82), and Virginia Raiders (1982–83).

== Coaching career ==
He was an assistant coach with the NHL's Tampa Bay Lightning from 1996 to 1998. MacQueen was named the OHL's "Coach of the Year' for guiding the Erie Otters to a 45-22-4 season record during the 2000-01 season and led the Erie Otters to the 2001-02 OHL Championship. MacQueen won his 400th OHL game on January 24, 2009, moving him into 10th all time in OHL history

MacQueen was relieved of his General Manager and Head Coach duties from the Sarnia Sting on February 6, 2011, a position he had held since the start of the 2006–07 OHL season. Team President Larry Ciccarelli said he felt that other teams were progressing while the Sting were moving in the opposite direction. MacQueen's coaching duties were turned over to former Sting assistant coach Trevor Letowski.

MacQueen became the head coach of Dornbirner EC (the team playing in the Austrian Hockey League a.k.a. EBEL since 2012) on August 12, 2012. He remained with the club through to the completion of the 2018–19 season.
