= Salem Raiders =

- City: Salem, Virginia
- League: Eastern Hockey League; Atlantic Coast Hockey League
- Home arena: Salem Civic Center
- Colors: Green, gold, white
- Owners: Robert Payne (1980–1982); Telstar, Inc. / Robert Connor (1982); Henry Brabham (1982–83)

Franchise history
- 1978–1980: Utica Mohawks
- 1980–1982: Salem Raiders
- 1982–1983: Virginia Raiders

Championships
- Regular season titles: 1 (1981–82)
- Division titles: None

The Salem Raiders were a professional hockey team that played in the Eastern Hockey League (EHL) and Atlantic Coast Hockey League (ACHL). They were originally the Utica Mohawks from 1978 to 1980 then became the Salem Raiders for the 1980–81 season, before transferring to the Atlantic Coast Hockey League during the 1981–82 season. The team was based in Salem, Virginia.

The Salem Raiders were coached by former Colorado Rockies coach Patrick Kelly, who led the Raiders to a league-best regular season record of 32–15–0. Salem defeated the Winston-Salem Thunderbirds in the first round of the playoffs, but eventually lost to the Mohawk Valley Stars in the Payne Trophy Finals.

The Raiders were led by 1981–82 ACHL MVP Dave MacQueen, who had 43 goals and 73 points in 36 games, and Tom Mullen, who led the team with 35 assists. MacQueen's goals and points totals and Mullen's assists totals led the league in their respective categories.

The Salem Raiders were then sold to Henry Brabham and re-branded as the Virginia Raiders for the 1982–83 season, but continued to play in the Salem Civic Center. Coach Pat Kelly was retained and the Raiders played 65 games compiling a record of 20 wins, 36 losses, and 9 ties for 51 points. They placed fourth in the six team ACHL, making the playoffs and lost in the first round. Brabham disbanded the team in 1983 citing financial losses and not coming to terms on a long-term lease in Salem.
