= Syracuse Hornets =

The Syracuse Hornets are a defunct professional ice hockey team that played in the Eastern Hockey League during the 1980–81 season. Based in Syracuse, New York the team played its home games out of the State Fairgrounds Coliseum.

The Hornets were owned by Gaetan Gagne, with former World Hockey Association defenceman, Bill Horton, as its general manager and player/coach. Although the Hornets were not affiliated with a National Hockey League (NHL) team, goaltenders Jay Palladino and Bill Milner were both assigned to play for the Hornets by the Hartford Whalers of the NHL.

The Hornets were scheduled to play the full 72 game schedule, but the team folded after playing just 10 games, with a win-loss-tie record of 0-9-1, having attracted a total of just 4,617 fans the five home games played.
