= Richmond Rifles =

- City: Richmond, VA
- League: Eastern Hockey League
- Operated: 1979-81
- Home arena: Richmond Coliseum
- Colors: Blue, orange, white
- Head coach: Andre Beaulieu (1979-1981); Bill Purcell (1980-1981)
- Affiliates: New York Rangers; Winnipeg Jets

Franchise history
- 1979-1981: Richmond Rifles

The Richmond Rifles were a professional ice hockey team of the Eastern Hockey League from 1979–1981, playing in Richmond, Virginia at the Richmond Coliseum. They played the final two seasons of the EHL. They were the affiliates of the New York Rangers for both seasons and the Winnipeg Jets for 1980-81.

== Season-by-season ==
Season	Games	Won	Lost	Tied	Points	Winning Pct (%)	Goals for	Goals against	Standing
1979–80	70	40	24	6	86	0.614	315	240	2nd
1980–81	72	38	29	5	81	0.563	331	295	2nd

== See also ==
- Richmond Robins
- Richmond Wildcats
- Richmond Renegades
- Richmond RiverDogs
