= 2019–20 Lehigh Valley Phantoms season =

2019–20 Lehigh Valley Phantoms
- Division: 7th Atlantic Division
- Conference: 14th Eastern Conference
- 2019–20 record: 24–28–3–7 (58 pts)
- Home record: 17–8–2–4
- Road record: 7–20–1–3
- Goals for: 161
- Goals against: 186

Team information
- General manager: Chuck Fletcher
- Coach: Scott Gordon
- Assistant coach: Kerry Huffman
- Captain: Andy Andreoff; Cal O'Reilly; Nate Prosser
- Arena: PPL Center
- Average attendance: 7,147

Team leaders
- Goals: Greg Carey (15)
- Assists: Cal O'Reilly (23)
- Points: Grey Carey (30)
- Penalty minutes: Kurtis Gabriel (92)
- Plus/minus: Kyle Criscuolo (+12)
- Wins: Jean-Francois Berube (12)
- Goals against average: Jean-Francois Berube (2.56)

The 2019–20 Lehigh Valley Phantoms season is the franchise's 24th season in the American Hockey League, which began on October 5, 2019. It marked the fifth season with Scott Gordon as head coach.

The Phantoms had an eight-game standings point streak from October 11 to November 2, the team's first since November 2016. By November 10, the Phantoms had played in six overtime games, the second-most in the AHL.

The season was suspended by the league officials on March 12, 2020, after several other professional and collegiate sports organizations followed suit as a result of the ongoing COVID-19 pandemic, and was not able to resume play.

== Off-season ==
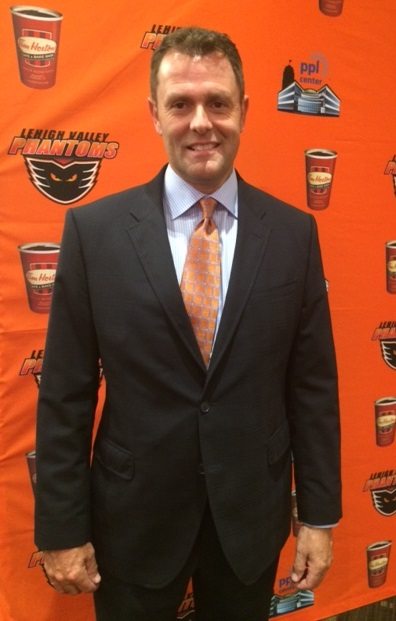
Scott Gordon returned for his fifth season as Lehigh Valley Phantoms head coach for the 2019–20 season.

Scott Gordon returned for his fifth season as head coach of the Lehigh Valley Phantoms, after having spent part of the previous season as interim head coach of the Philadelphia Flyers. The Phantoms made several new additions during the off-season, including forwards Andy Andreoff and Cal O'Reilly, and defenseman Nate Prosser. Andreoff played the previous season for the Syracuse Crunch, while O'Reilly and Prosser played for the Minnesota Wild organization. At 33, Prosser was the oldest player on the Phantoms at the start of the season, and the most experienced at the National Hockey League level, having played 354 games there. Just before the season began, Andreoff, O'Reilly, and Prosser were named team co-captains for the Phantoms. This marked the fourth team O'Reilly has served as a captain, along with the Utica Comets, Rochester Americans, and Iowa Wild.

The Phantoms played three preseason games, starting with two consecutive wins against the Wilkes-Barre/Scranton Penguins. The game marked the first appearance as Phantoms for goaltender Jean-Francois Berube, who made 22 saves. The Phantoms lost their final preseason game on September 30, a 2–0 shutout loss to the Hershey Bears, bringing the Phantoms to a final preseason record of 2–1–0–0. Only six players from the Phantoms' 2018–19 season opening roster were still on the team as it entered its 2019–20 regular season. At the start of the season, The Hockey News included Phantoms defenseman Philippe Myers on its list of the "10 AHL Players You Should Be Watching in 2019–20". Heading into the regular season, Gordon believed the Phantoms lineup was one of the best Lehigh Valley ever had.

== Regular season ==
=== October ===
The Phantoms lost their season opener to the Providence Bruins at home on October 5 in a 3–0 shutout. The game marked the AHL debut of center Morgan Frost, and marked the sixth consecutive home opener with a sold-out crowd at the PPL Center, which included every season since the Phantoms franchise relocated to Lehigh Valley from Glens Falls, New York. Joel Farabee scored his first professional goal during his AHL debut on October 11 in a 4–1 win over the Wilkes-Barre/Scranton Penguins. Forward Kurtis Gabriel scored the Phantoms' first goal of the season in the game, and his first as a member of the team, and Greg Carey scored his 100th career AHL assist on Farabee's goal. The matchup also marked the 700th professional game of defenseman T. J. Brennan, and the 114th game as a Phantom for goaltender Alex Lyon, more than any other goalie since the Phantoms moved to the Lehigh Valley in 2014. The Phantoms played their first overtime game of the season in a 4–3 loss to the Hershey Bears on October 12, losing with one second remaining in overtime. Maxim Sushko and Isaac Ratcliffe each scored their first professional goals in the game, and Farabee scored for the second consecutive game, and was named the Phantoms' Player of the Week. The Phantoms were 0-for-11 on the power play through their first three games.

Frost recorded three assists against the Binghamton Devils on October 18, which marked his first professional points, and he scored his first professional goal the next day against the Springfield Thunderbirds. Farabee was called up to the Philadelphia Flyers on October 20, after leading the Phantoms with three goals, and getting at least one point in each of his four games on the season. The Phantoms lost their first away game of the season in a shootout against the defending Calder Cup Champion Charlotte Checkers on October 25, but defeated them the next day, marking two consecutive games in which the Phantoms overcame a deficit after two periods. The Phantoms made a season-high 42 shots on October 26, a game that also marked Berube's first win as a Phantom, as well as Carey's 89th career goal with the team, the most of any Phantoms player. The Phantoms ended October on a six-game standings point streak beginning on October 11. Frost finished the month with a four-game point streak, tied with Farabee for the longest of the season at that point, and both Frost and center German Rubtsov ended October tied for most points and assists, with each recording 2 goals and 4 assists. On October 31, the Flyers recalled Myers, Rubtsov, and right-wing Carsen Twarynski from the Phantoms. At the time of his recall, Myers had a team-leading plus–minus rating of +8, which was tied for fourth-best in the AHL.

=== November ===
A November 1 shootout loss to Wilkes-Barre/Scranton marked the fourth consecutive game the Phantoms rallied from behind in the third period to either win or force overtime. The Phantoms' standings point streak extended to eight games with a 3–2 win against the Bridgeport Sound Tigers on November 2, the team's first eight-game streak since November 2016. The streak ended the next day with a 4–3 loss to Bridgeport, Lehigh Valley's sixth consecutive game decided by one goal. (Note: The Times Herald-Record notes that with the November 2 game, "the Phantoms have played five consecutive one-goal decisions", and the following game on November 3 was decided by one goal as well.) The game was Lyon's first regulation loss of the season, and marked the end of a seven-game point streak for Frost, over which he had four goals and five assists. It would be the longest points streak for a Phantom for the calendar year 2019. As of November 4, rookie right-wing Maksim Sushko ranked was third in the AHL with a 42.9 shooting percentage, with three goals on seven shot attempts. Defenseman Samuel Morin, who was playing in the Phantoms on a conditioning stint before an expected return to the Flyers, tore the anterior cruciate ligament in his right knee during a November 6 game against Wilkes-Barre/Scranton, an injury expected to end his season. Right-wing Kyle Criscuolo recorded his 100th professional point and first multi-point game with three points during a November 6 victory against Wilkes-Barre/Scranton, his first two-goal game since February 16, 2018. As of November 7, the Phantoms were 3–0–0–0 in games when leading after two periods.

The Phantoms won their season's first overtime victory on November 9, as defenseman Andy Welinski scored his first career overtime goal to seal a 3–2 victory win the Hershey Bears. Following that game, Lehigh Valley had a winless four-game road trip, starting with a November 10 shootout loss against Hershey. It was the Phantoms' sixth overtime game of the season, the second-most in the AHL, with a league-tying four of those games going to a shootout. As of November 10, Frost had a team-leading five goals and 12 points, which rated second among AHL rookies in scoring. The Phantoms tied their season-high in shots with 42 in a 2–1 loss to Springfield on November 13. Frost was called up to the Flyers on November 18, after having scored 12 points (five goals and seven assists) in 16 games with the Phantoms. Twarynski was returned to the Phantoms the same day. Lehigh Valley snapped a four-game losing streak on November 20 with a 3–2 win over Charlotte, their first regulation win since November 6, and the first time they scored more than one goal since November 10. It also marked the season debut of forward Pascal Laberge, who was recalled from the Reading Royals the previous day and scored the game's first goal.

On November 22, in the Phantoms' seventh overtime game of the season, defenseman Tyler Wotherspoon played in his 400th professional game and recorded three assists, which tied his career-high. Mikhail Vorobyev also had three assists in the game, which was the last in his eight-game point streak. (Note: The Lehigh Valley Phantoms website noted Vorobyev had a six-game point streak as of November 16, and official American Hockey League gamesheets show Vorobyev continued that streak with one goal and one assist on November 20, and three assists on November 22. This marked the end of the points streak, as Vorobyev scored no points in the next game on November 23.) A November 27 loss to the Penguins marked the first time in the season that the Phantoms lost in regulation after scoring the game's first goal, and dropped the team's record to 5–1–2 when scoring first. The Phantoms defeated Wilkes-Barre/Scrantron in their next matchup on November 29, a 6–5 overtime victory that saw Matthew Strome score his first professional goal. A 2–1 overtime win against Hartford on November 30 marked the 375th career win of Scott Gordon, moving him into eight place for wins by an AHL coach. It also marked the first time in Phantoms history they won two back-to-back OT games at home, and only the fourth time in franchise history they've ever won in OT on consecutive nights. The game was their fourth overtime win of the season, tied for most in the AHL to that point.

=== December ===
When we went into the season, I actually thought this was going to be one of the best teams we'd ever had. But at one point, we had nine players out — two of our own [AHL] players who were contracted with us, and seven guys who got called up [to the NHL]".

— Scott Gordon

Two months into the season, the Phantoms had dealt with more roster moves and injuries than most AHL teams, with key players like Joel Farabee, Morgan Frost and Philippe Myers getting called up to the Flyers, and others having also spent time in the NHL before returning to the Phantoms, such as Andy Andreoff, Connor Bunnaman, German Rubtsov, Carsen Twarynski, and Mikhail Vorobyev. At one point, the Phantoms lineup was missing four centers, as well as several defensemen and many of their youngest players. At one point, the team has nine players out of the lineup simultaneously. Lehigh Valley began December with a four-game losing streak, starting with a 3–1 loss to Springfield on December 4 despite a franchise-record 63 shots by Lehigh Valley. Greg Carey also set a single-game franchise record with 14 shots on goal, and opposing goalie Philippe Desrosiers' 62 saves was the most ever made against the Phantoms by an opposing goalie. All three of those previous records had been set in a Philadelphia Phantoms game against the Cincinnati Mighty Ducks on January 6, 1999, when the Phantoms made 60 shots, Richard Park made 13 shots on goal, and Tom Askey made 61 saves against Philadelphia. Bunnaman scored a goal in the December 4 game that made him the 23rd Phantom to score in 2019, the most in the AHL to that point.

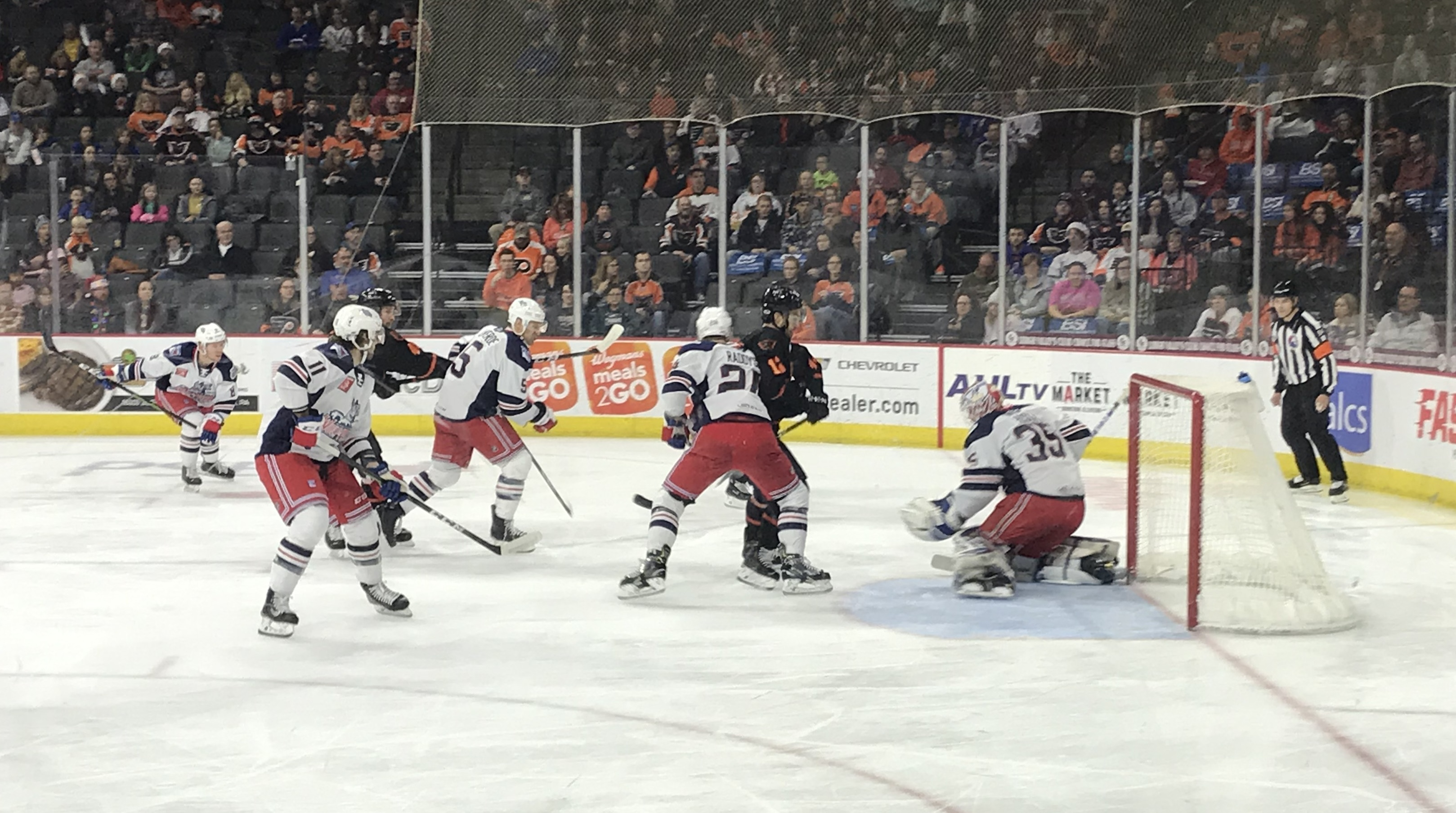
The Lehigh Valley Phantoms during a game against the Hartford Wolf Pack at the PPL Center on December 14, 2019.

December 6 marked the 200th professional game for Andy Welinski and Reece Willcox; all of Willcox's games were with Phantoms. Kyle Criscuolo reached his 200th game on December 7, which also marked the 227th game for Nicolas Aubé-Kubel, the fifth most of any player in Lehigh Valley history. The Phantoms 1–0 loss to the Hershey Bears on December 7 was the fifth straight game between the two teams to be decided by one goal, the first 1–0 loss for the Phantoms since they came to Lehigh Valley in 2014, and the first 1–0 loss in 249 games against Hershey dating back to 1996. As of that game, the Phantoms had a league-leading 18 games decided by one goal, out of 25 season games played in total. The Phantoms also lost 4–0 to Hartford on December 13, their second straight shutout loss, and the third one of the season. December 13 saw the return of Andreoff, Rubtsov, Maksim Sushko, Chris Bigras, all of whom had been out three weeks or longer due to injury. A December 21 game against Charlotte saw the AHL debut of left-wing Max Willman, and Bigras' first multi-point game with Lehigh Valley, both assists. Laberge also scored two goals, his third multi-goal game in 28 contests. Charlotte beat the Phantoms 4–2 the next day, the first time in six games on the season that the defending Calder Cup champions defeated Lehigh Valley in regulation. It also marked the first of a four-game losing streak for the Phantoms.

Carey scored his team-leading ninth goal of the season on December 22. It was his 97th career goal with Lehigh Valley, the most in team history and fourth all-time for the Phantoms franchise dating back to 1996. Heading into December 27, the Phantoms had scored 71 goals in the season, the second-fewest in the Eastern Conference, with Carey's nine goals making him the team's only player with more than five. Lehigh Valley also ranks 29th and 30th, respectively, on the power play and penalty kill. During a December 27 game against Wilkes-Barre/Scranton, center Gerry Fitzgerald scored the Phantoms first goal in the first 31 seconds, the team's fastest goal to start a game for the season. Fitzgerald also scored on a second consecutive game on December 28 against the Utica Comets. The next day, the Flyers sent Morgan Frost back down to the Phantoms. Carey finished the 2019 calendar year with the most points for the Phantoms, with 22 goals and 44 total points dating back to January 1.

=== January ===
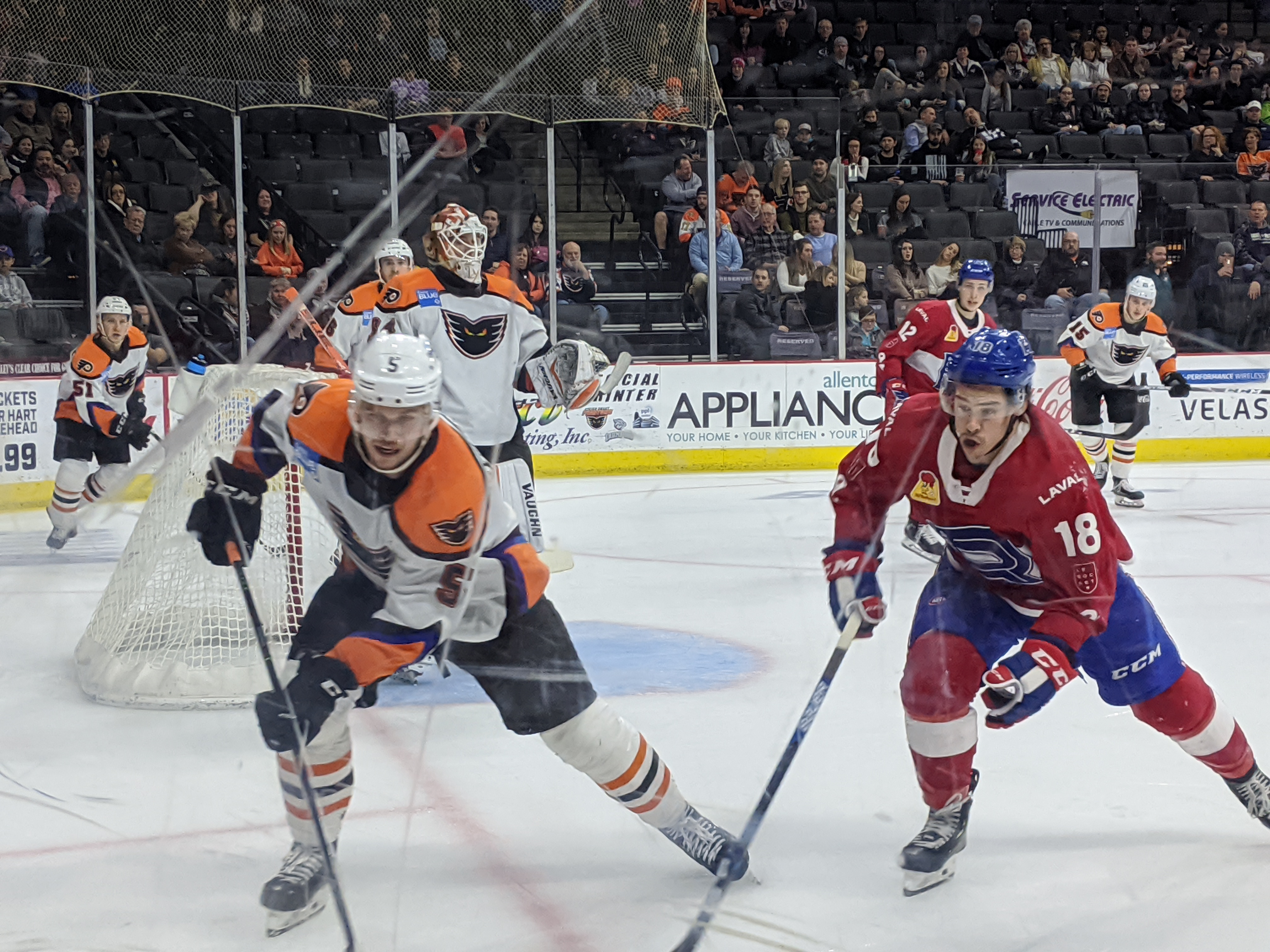
The Lehigh Valley Phantoms facing the Laval Rocket at the PPL Center on January 11, 2020.

At the start of the new year, Pollstar announced the PPL Center ranked No. 4 overall in number of tickets sold in 2019 among arenas with 10,000 or fewer seats. Morgan Frost was also named to the 2020 AHL All-Star Classic, Lehigh Valley's sole representative on the All-Star team. Frost had five goals and seven assists in 16 games at the time he was selected, ranking second on the team in goals and first among Phantoms rookies in points, as well as in the top 10 among all AHL rookies in points per game. Lehigh Valley lost their first two games of the year before getting their first win of 2020 against the Toronto Marlies on January 5, ending a six-game losing streak. Through January 9, Maksim Sushko's plus–minus of +11 was the Phantoms' highest and the fifth-highest among AHL rookies. Connor Bunnaman had a three-game goal streak through January 10, which tied Joel Farabee for the team's longest of the season. January 10 also marked the return of Andy Andreoff, Kyle Criscuolo, and Misha Vorobyev after long absences. Through that date, nine different players who had not been on the Philadelphia Flyers' opening roster had been called up from the Phantoms for at least one NHL appearance during the season, an indication of the large amount of player movement the team had experienced.

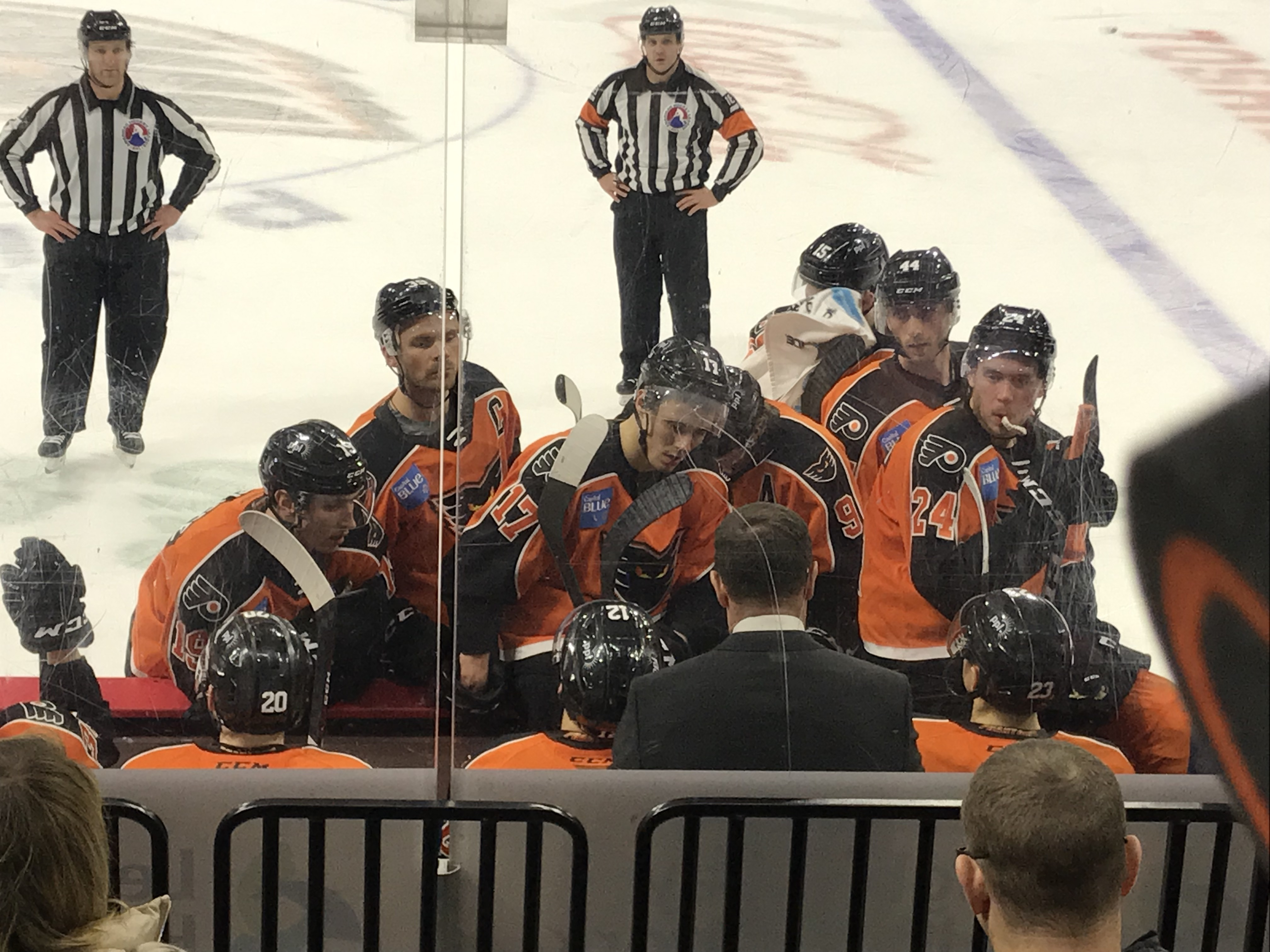
The Lehigh Valley Phantoms during a game at the PPL Center on January 15, 2020.

The Phantoms hosted on a five-game homestead from January 11 to 18, and won each of those games, which included three shutouts and two victories by scores of 5–4 and 4–1. The team had consecutive 2–0 shutouts on January 11 and 12, with Alex Lyon making 37 saves during Lehigh Valley's first home win of 2020 on January 11. It was his first shutout of the season and the sixth of his career, the most of any goaltender in Lehigh Valley history. The game also saw Bunnaman extend his point streak to four games, shortly after which he was called up to the Flyers for the second time in the season. Jean-François Bérubé made 35 saves in his first shutout of the season on January 12. Through that date, Lehigh Valley had the fewest goals scored in the AHL with 88. Frost recorded his first professional two-goal game on January 15 against the Syracuse Crunch, and Max Willman scored his first AHL goal. A January 17 victory over the Binghamton Devils marked Isaac Ratcliffe's first career multi-point game, as well as Sushko's first multi-point game since November 3. Bérubé won his fourth straight game on January 18, (Note: The Morning Call notes that January 17 was Bérubé's "third straight victory in goal", and Bérubé followed that up with another win on January 18.) and recorded his second shutout of season and of the week. The 4–0 victory over the Rochester Americans also saw Greg Carey score two goals, making him the first player to score 100 goals since the Phantoms moved to Lehigh Valley, and tying Kirby Law for third-most goals in overall Phantoms franchise history.

Alex Lyon was called up to the Flyers to serve as back-up goaltender to Brian Elliott after Philadelphia goalie Carter Hart suffered an abdominal injury on January 15. The Phantoms embarked on a four-game road trip on January 22 to 31, which would conclude with a 0–2–1 record. The team lost the first game in a shootout, ending their winning streak but keeping their point streak alive at six games. It marked Cal O'Reilly's 700th career AHL game, and during the team's next game on January 24, he became the 47th player in AHL history to record 600 points. That matchup marked the Phantom's first regulation loss since January 9. Forward David Kaše had a four-game point streak heading into the AHL All-Star break that began on January 26. By the break, the Phantoms had the second-fewest power play goals in the league, and Carey was the only player at double digits in scoring, with 13 goals and 23 points. The team had a 14–5–4 record at home, but a 4–16–3 record in away games. Bunnaman was recalled to the Flyers after the AHL All-Star break.

=== February ===
The Phantoms snapped its four-game losing streak with a 3–0 victory against the Hershey Bears on February 1, with Bérubé making 18 saves in his third shutout in a month. David Kase continued a career-best four-point streak in the matchup, and Chris Stewart scored his first goal for Lehigh Valley, which marked his first goal in an AHL game in more than 11 years. The Phantoms' penalty kill was at a 90% success rate over 19 games through February 1, and the team had stopped 13 consecutive opposing power plays over the previous six games. The Phantoms won their sixth consecutive home game on February 7, and extended its overall winning streak to three games on February 8, in which rookie goalie Kirill Ustimenko made 38 saves in his AHL debut during a 5–3 win against the Wilkes-Barre/Scranton Penguins. Maksim Sushko scored two goals, his second multi-goal game of the season, bringing him to a team-leading five multi-point games, as well as a team-leading plus–minus of +12. Wotherspoon and Criscuolo each also scored two points for a second straight game.

Isaac Ratcliffe scored for a second consecutive game on February 9, and Steven Swavely scored just a few hours after he was recalled from the Reading Royals. The Phantoms lost 5–2 to the Hershey Bears, ending their home winning stream at six games. Greg Carey played in his 266th game on February 14, moving past Chris Conner for most games played in Lehigh Valley history. The Phantoms defeated the Bridgeport Sound Tigers in overtime on February 14, bringing their overtime record to 5–1, the second-highest in the AHL. The team followed that win with two consecutive games on February 15 and 16; Chris Bigras recorded his 100th professional point in the latter game. Through February 16, the Phantoms were 8–0–0–1 at home when leading after the first period, and scored the first goal in 29 of 53 total games, the league's seventh-highest percentage. Lehigh Valley scored a season-high eight goals in an 8–5 victory against Bridgeport on February 19, with Carey and Carsen Twarynski each scoring twice, and seven different Phantoms recording multiple points. Morgan Frost also extended a goal-scoring streak to three games during the matchup, while Reece Willcox had a career-best three assists and had a plus–minus of +5, the highest single-game total for any Phantoms player in the season. Defenseman Shayne Gostisbehere joined the team on February 21 for a conditioning stint after a knee injury. It marked his first game with the Phantoms in four years, though he only stayed with the team for two games. Lehigh Valley lost 3–2 in overtime to the Rochester Americans on February 21, the Phantoms' second overtime loss of the year.

The Philadelphia Flyers traded several Phantoms players in late February: Kyle Criscuolo to the Anaheim Ducks, T. J. Brennan to the Chicago Blackhawks, and Bérubé to the New York Rangers. The Bérubé trade allowed for Ustimenko to be permanently promoted to the Phantoms from the Reading Royals. Connor Bunnaman and Joel Farabee were also sent down to the Phantoms from Philadelphia, though Farabee only played in one Lehigh Valley game before the Flyers recalled him to replace a sick Sean Couturier. Bunnaman scored two goals in his first game back on February 28, and the next day Ustimenko made 24 saves in his Phantoms home debut, a 4–2 loss to the Charlotte Checkers. By the end of March, Carey led the team in points with 29 (six goals and 23 assists) in 48 games in the season, and three different players had six multi-point games at that point: Andy Welinski, Mark Friedman, and Tyler Wotherspoon.

=== March ===
The Phantoms lost all four games they played in March, allowing 17 goals in the first three games of the month. The team started with a 6–4 loss to the Bridgeport Sound Tigers on March 6 despite two goals and three points from Morgan Frost. Carsen Twarynski scored in two consecutive games on March 6 and 7, the latter a 5–1 loss to the Binghamton Devils. The Phantoms got multi-point games from five different skaters on March 8, including three points from Mikhail Vorobyev, but lost 6–5 to Bridgeport in a shootout. Vorobyev recorded his 100th professional point in the game, which also marked Reece Willcox's 231st career game, the fourth-highest amount in Lehigh Valley history. Willcox also scored two points on March 8, bringing him to 58 career points with Lehigh Valley, tied for 17th most and moving him ahead of Andy Miele and Travis Sanheim. Through March 8, Isaac Ratcliffe was tied for third among all AHL rookies with three shorthanded points in the season. Tyler Wotherspoon also had three shorthanded points, which was tied for second among the league's defensemen. On March 11, the Phantoms lost what would prove to be their final game of the season, a 2–1 overtime defeat at home to the Wilkes-Barre/Scranton Penguins.

On March 12, the AHL announced the indefinite suspension of league-wide play due to health and safety concerns from the COVID-19 pandemic. Chuck Fletcher, general manager of the Flyers and Phantoms, praised the suspension as "the only rational decision", saying: "This is bigger than hockey, bigger than sports in general". Four days later, the league announced the suspension would last until at least May, and that players should be allowed return to their primary residences.

Later that month, The Hockey News released its "Future Watch" edition, ranking the Flyers' development system the eighth-best out of 31 National Hockey League teams, with a grade of B+. The magazine singled out several prospects playing on the Phantoms, including Frost (ranked the No. 1 prospect), Ratcliffe (No. 4), and Rubtsov (No. 8).

=== April ===
On April 6, Kurtis Gabriel was named the Phantoms' team winner for the AHL Man of the Year award, as selected by the club for outstanding contributions to the community and charitable organizations. Gabriel had volunteered for the Phantoms Charities Youth Sled Hockey Team, and was the only NHL or AHL player who worte rainbow pride tape on his hockey stick during every game in support of the LGBT community.

== Division standings ==
y– indicates team has clinched division and a playoff spot
x– indicates team has clinched a playoff spot
e– indicates team has been eliminated from playoff contention

As of March 11, 2020

Atlantic Division	GP	W	L	OTL	SOL	Pts	Pts%	GF	GA
Providence Bruins (BOS)	62	38	18	3	3	82	.661	197	154
Hershey Bears (WSH)	62	37	18	3	4	81	.653	187	157
Charlotte Checkers (CAR)	61	34	22	5	0	73	.598	202	172
Hartford Wolf Pack (NYR)	62	31	20	6	5	73	.589	171	173
Wilkes-Barre/Scranton Penguins (PIT)	63	29	26	3	5	66	.524	164	193
Springfield Thunderbirds (FLA)	61	31	27	3	0	65	.533	190	186
Lehigh Valley Phantoms (PHI)	62	24	28	3	7	58	.468	161	186
Bridgeport Sound Tigers (NYI)	63	23	33	5	2	53	.421	152	206

== Schedule and results ==
2019–20 Game Log – Regular season

October: 3–1–1–2 (Home: 2–1–1–1; Road: 1–0–0–1)
#	Date	Visitor	Score	Home	OT	Decision	Attendance	Record	Pts	Gamesheet
1	October 5	Providence	0–3	Lehigh Valley		Berube	8,453	0–1–0–0	0	Gamesheet
2	October 11	Wilkes-Barre/Scranton	1–4	Lehigh Valley		Lyon	6,078	1–1–0–0	2	Gamesheet
3	October 12	Hershey	4–3	Lehigh Valley	OT	Berube	7,227	1–1–1–0	3	Gamesheet
4	October 18	Binghamton	1–4	Lehigh Valley		Lyon	5,719	2–1–1–0	5	Gamesheet
5	October 19	Springfield	4–3	Lehigh Valley	SO	Berube	6,011	2–1–1–1	6	Gamesheet
6	October 25	Lehigh Valley	2–3	Charlotte	SO	Lyon	5,912	2–1–1–2	7	Gamesheet
7	October 26	Lehigh Valley	3–2	Charlotte		Berube	6,977	3–1–1–2	9	Gamesheet

November: 7–6–0–2 (Home: 6–1–0–1; Road: 1–5–0–1)
#	Date	Visitor	Score	Home	OT	Decision	Attendance	Record	Pts	Gamesheet
8	November 1	Wilkes-Barre/Scranton	4–3	Lehigh Valley	SO	Lyon	6,674	3–1–1–3	10	Gamesheet
9	November 2	Lehigh Valley	3–2	Bridgeport		Berube	2,420	4–1–1–3	12	Gamesheet
10	November 3	Lehigh Valley	3–4	Bridgeport		Lyon	1,959	4–2–1–3	12	Gamesheet
11	November 6	Wilkes-Barre/Scranton	2–4	Lehigh Valley		Berube	8,567	5–2–1–3	14	Gamesheet
12	November 9	Hershey	2–3	Lehigh Valley	OT	Lyon	8,776	6–2–1–3	16	Gamesheet
13	November 10	Lehigh Valley	2–3	Hershey	SO	Berube	8,731	6–2–1–4	17	Gamesheet
14	November 13	Lehigh Valley	1–2	Springfield		Lyon	6,527	6–3–1–4	17	Gamesheet
15	November 15	Lehigh Valley	1–3	Binghamton		Berube	4,511	6–4–1–4	17	Gamesheet
16	November 16	Lehigh Valley	1–2	Wilkes-Barre/Scranton		Lyon	4,578	6–5–1–4	17	Gamesheet
17	November 20	Charlotte	2–3	Lehigh Valley		Lyon	5,469	7–5–1–4	19	Gamesheet
18	November 22	Charlotte	4–5	Lehigh Valley	OT	Lyon	6,462	8–5–1–4	21	Gamesheet
19	November 23	Belleville	2–1	Lehigh Valley		Berube	6,157	8–6–1–4	21	Gamesheet
20	November 27	Lehigh Valley	2–6	Wilkes-Barre/Scranton		Lyon	4,163	8–7–1–4	21	Gamesheet
21	November 29	Wilkes-Barre/Scranton	5–6	Lehigh Valley	OT	Berube	6,752	9–7–1–4	23	Gamesheet
22	November 30	Hartford	1–2	Lehigh Valley	OT	Lyon	7,027	10–7–1–4	25	Gamesheet

December: 2–9–0–0 (Home: 1–3–0–0; Road: 1–6–0–0)
#	Date	Visitor	Score	Home	OT	Decision	Attendance	Record	Pts	Gamesheet
23	December 4	Lehigh Valley	1–3	Springfield		Lyon	2,709	10–8–1–4	25	Gamesheet
24	December 6	Hershey	2–1	Lehigh Valley		Lyon	6,745	10–9–1–4	25	Gamesheet
25	December 7	Lehigh Valley	0–1	Hershey		Berube	7,531	10–10–1–4	25	Gamesheet
26	December 13	Lehigh Valley	0–4	Hartford		Lyon	3,242	10–11–1–4	25	Gamesheet
27	December 14	Hartford	2–4	Lehigh Valley		Berube	8,443	11–11–1–4	27	Gamesheet
28	December 15	Lehigh Valley	1–3	Hershey		Lyon	7,581	11–12–1–4	27	Gamesheet
29	December 21	Lehigh Valley	3–2	Charlotte		Lyon	6,788	12–12–1–4	29	Gamesheet
30	December 22	Lehigh Valley	2–4	Charlotte		Berube	5,804	12–13–1–4	29	Gamesheet
31	December 27	Lehigh Valley	2–4	Wilkes-Barre/Scranton		Lyon	6,263	12–14–1–4	29	Gamesheet
32	December 28	Utica	4–2	Lehigh Valley		Berube	7,806	12–15–1–4	29	Gamesheet
33	December 29	Hershey	3–0	Lehigh Valley		Lyon	8,104	12–16–1–4	29	Gamesheet

January: 6–6–0–1 (Home: 5–0–0–0; Road: 1–6–0–1)
#	Date	Visitor	Score	Home	OT	Decision	Attendance	Record	Pts	Gamesheet
34	January 3	Lehigh Valley	0–4	Laval		Berube	8,282	12–17–1–4	29	Gamesheet
35	January 4	Lehigh Valley	3–5	Belleville		Lyon	2,993	12–18–1–4	29	Gamesheet
36	January 5	Lehigh Valley	4–2	Toronto		Lyon	5,273	13–18–1–4	31	Gamesheet
37	January 10	Lehigh Valley	2–5	Utica		Berube	3,935	13–19–1–4	31	Gamesheet
38	January 11	Laval	0–2	Lehigh Valley		Lyon	7,961	14–19–1–4	33	Gamesheet
39	January 12	Cleveland	0–2	Lehigh Valley		Berube	7,569	15–19–1–4	35	Gamesheet
40	January 15	Syracuse	4–5	Lehigh Valley		Berube	5,471	16–19–1–4	37	Gamesheet
41	January 17	Binghamton	1–4	Lehigh Valley		Berube	6,447	17–19–1–4	39	Gamesheet
42	January 18	Rochester	0–4	Lehigh Valley		Berube	8,450	18–19–1–4	41	Gamesheet
43	January 22	Lehigh Valley	2–3	Providence	SO	Berube	6,102	18–19–1–5	42	Gamesheet
44	January 24	Lehigh Valley	3–4	Providence		Lyon	7,610	18–20–1–5	42	Gamesheet
45	January 25	Lehigh Valley	2–4	Hartford		Lyon	6,617	18–21–1–5	42	Gamesheet
46	January 31	Lehigh Valley	1–4	Wilkes-Barre/Scranton		Berube	6,201	18–22–1–5	42	Gamesheet

February: 6–4–1–1 (Home: 3–2–0–1; Road: 3–2–1–0)
#	Date	Visitor	Score	Home	OT	Decision	Attendance	Record	Pts	Gamesheet
47	February 1	Lehigh Valley	3–0	Hershey		Berube	10,363	19–22–1–5	44	Gamesheet
48	February 7	Springfield	1–4	Lehigh Valley		Berube	6,312	20–22–1–5	46	Gamesheet
49	February 8	Lehigh Valley	5–3	Wilkes-Barre/Scranton		Ustimenko	8,107	21–22–1–5	48	Gamesheet
50	February 9	Hershey	5–2	Lehigh Valley		Berube	8,442	21–23–1–5	48	Gamesheet
51	February 14	Bridgeport	2–3	Lehigh Valley	OT	Lyon	6,250	22–23–1–5	50	Gamesheet
52	February 15	Hartford	4–3	Lehigh Valley	SO	Lyon	8,221	22–23–1–6	51	Gamesheet
53	February 16	Lehigh Valley	3–5	Hershey		Berube	10,437	22–24–1–6	51	Gamesheet
54	February 19	Lehigh Valley	8–5	Bridgeport		Berube	1,817	23–24–1–6	53	Gamesheet
55	February 21	Lehigh Valley	2–3	Rochester	OT	Lyon	6,196	23–24–2–6	54	Gamesheet
56	February 22	Lehigh Valley	1–2	Syracuse		Ustimenko	6,049	23–25–2–6	54	Gamesheet
57	February 28	Charlotte	3–5	Lehigh Valley		Lyon	6,811	24–25–2–6	56	Gamesheet
58	February 29	Charlotte	4–2	Lehigh Valley		Ustimenko	7,744	24–26–2–6	56	Gamesheet

March: 0–2–1–1 (Home: 0–1–1–1; Road: 0–1–0–0)
#	Date	Visitor	Score	Home	OT	Decision	Attendance	Record	Pts	Gamesheet
59	March 6	Bridgeport	6–4	Lehigh Valley		Ustimenko	6,511	24–27–2–6	56	Gamesheet
60	March 7	Lehigh Valley	1–5	Binghamton		Lyon	3,164	24–28–2–6	56	Gamesheet
61	March 8	Bridgeport	6–5	Lehigh Valley	SO	Ustimenko	8,500	24–28–2–7	57	Gamesheet
62	March 11	Wilkes-Barre/Scranton	2–1	Lehigh Valley	OT	Lyon	6,393	24–28–3–7	58	Gamesheet
Season suspended league-wide on March 12 due to COVID-19 pandemic. Games listed below have been postponed; any makeup dates have yet to be announced
63	March 13	Wilkes-Barre/Scranton	–	Lehigh Valley
64	March 14	Toronto	–	Lehigh Valley
65	March 18	Lehigh Valley	–	Binghamton
66	March 20	Hershey	–	Lehigh Valley
67	March 21	Cleveland	–	Lehigh Valley
68	March 25	Lehigh Valley	–	Hershey
69	March 28	Lehigh Valley	–	Cleveland
70	March 29	Lehigh Valley	–	Cleveland

April: 0–0–0–0 (Home: 0–0–0–0; Road: 0–0–0–0)
#	Date	Visitor	Score	Home	OT	Decision	Attendance	Record	Pts	Gamesheet
Season suspended league-wide on March 12 due to COVID-19 pandemic. Games listed below have been postponed; any makeup dates have yet to be announced
71	April 3	Providence	–	Lehigh Valley
72	April 4	Providence	–	Lehigh Valley
73	April 5	Lehigh Valley	–	Wilkes-Barre/Scranton
74	April 8	Binghamton	–	Lehigh Valley
75	April 10	Lehigh Valley	–	Hartford
76	April 11	Lehigh Valley	–	Providence

Legend: Win (2 points) Loss (0 points) Overtime/shootout loss (1-point)
