= Johnstown Red Wings =

- City: Johnstown, Pennsylvania
- League: Eastern Hockey League
- Founded: 1978
- Operated: 1978–1980
- Home arena: Cambria County War Memorial Arena
- Colors: Red, White
- General manager: Al Blade
- Head coach: Marty Read
- Media: WJNL, 1490 AM
- Affiliates: Detroit Red Wings, Adirondack Red Wings

Franchise history
- 1978–1979: Johnstown Wings
- 1979–1980: Johnstown Red Wings

The Johnstown Red Wings were a professional ice hockey team based in Johnstown, Pennsylvania They were founded as a member of the Eastern Hockey League in the 1979-80 season. The Red Wings were used as an affiliate to the Adirondack Red Wings of the AHL. At the time, Adirondack was the primary affiliate of the Detroit Red Wings.

== History ==
A year after Johnstown's 1977 flood, former Jets Executive Director/GM John Mitchell founded the Johnstown Wings of the Northeastern Hockey League. Mitchell used his connections with the NHL's Detroit Red Wings for the 1978-79 NEHL season.

Mitchell worked with Lincoln Cavalieri, who was president of Olympia Stadium Corporation. At the time, Olympia Stadium Corporation owned the Detroit team, and Mitchell was able to secure an affiliation with the Red Wings. Johnstown worked closely with Detroit General Manager Ted Lindsay and Assistant GM Jim Skinner to develop players. Mitchell eventually ran into financial difficulties. With the assistance of local businesses and a local television station (WJAC-TV) ran a "Keep Hockey Alive" promotion, enough donations were raised to help fund the Wings' expenses for the season.

The following season, a group of 10 prominent local business people took over the team, now the Johnstown Red Wings (with the NEHL taking on the league name of the former Eastern Hockey League). The 1979–80 team had difficulties on the ice and also lost money, but negotiations with the War Memorial for a new lease were underway when the EHL folded. The Red Wings hired a new coach for the 1979-80 EHL season. Marty Read, the new coach of the Red Wings, had previously played his college hockey at University of Michigan. The Red Wings had a mascot, a red bird named "Reddy", who was brought on midway through the season. The Red Wings played for one season, disbanding after a 24-45-1 season. The team averaged 2,309 fans per game, and had four games where they drew over 3,000 fans. Following the 1979-80 season, the team ceased operations.

Johnstown would go without hockey until January 1988, when the Johnstown Chiefs were brought back as part of the AAHL's inaugural 1987–88 season.

== Season-by-season results ==
Eastern Hockey League seasons only.

=== Regular season ===
Season	Games	Won	Lost	Tied	Points	GF	GA	Standings
1979–80	70	24	45	1	49	281	384	5th

=== Playoffs ===
None

== Notable personnel ==
- Jim Cardiff, played three seasons in the WHA as a member of the Philadelphia/Vancouver Blazers. Played two partial seasons with the Johnstown Jets before finishing his career as a member of the Red Wings. Briefly coached the team during the final 23 games of the 1979–80 season.
- Ron Docken, starting goalie for Johnstown Wings in 1978–79, had minor role in Slap Shot as backup goalie "Lebrun".
- Lorry Gloeckner, played 13 games for the Detroit Red Wings, sat out a season due to injuries, played final season in Johnstown before retiring.
- John Hilworth, former Detroit Red Wings draft pick (55th overall, 1977 NHL entry draft) who played 57 games over three seasons with Johnstown's parent club.
- Claude Legris, former Detroit Red Wings draft pick (120th overall, 1976 NHL entry draft) who made one appearance in Johnstown. Legris remained in Detroit's system until his eventual retirement in 1983.
- Ted Lindsay, member of the Hockey Hall Of Fame who briefly accepted position as General Manager with the team.
- Dave MacQueen, leading scorer for the Red Wings in 1979–80, former Tampa Bay Lightning assistant coach.
- Harry Shaw, played 15 years of professional hockey.
- Paul Steigerwald, started broadcasting career as the play-by-play announcer for the Johnstown Red Wings, taking over the role that was previously held by Donald Evans, who was also the Sports Programming Director of WJAC-TV during the 1978–79 season. Steigerwald later held the same role as the Pittsburgh Penguins as a color analyst on radio (1985–2004) and play by play announcer on television (2006–2017). He moved to the Penguins' front office and assumed the role of communications and marketing advisor, a role that he continues to hold in 2025.
- Wayne Wood, former New York Rangers draft pick (83rd overall, 1971 NHL entry draft).
