= Brian Burke (Gaelic footballer) =

Irish Gaelic footballer

Brian Burke is an Irish retired Gaelic footballer who played as a midfielder for the Tipperary senior team.

From Fethard, Co. Tipperary. Burke first arrived on the inter-county scene at the age of fifteen when he first linked up with the Tipperary minor team before later joining the under-21 and junior sides. Burke made his senior debut during the 1985 championship and played at inter-county level for Tipperary for 13 years.

He has won five Tipperary Senior Football Championship medals with his club, Fethard.

He represented Ireland against Australia in the 1990 International Rules Series.

He retired from inter-county football following the conclusion of the 1998 championship.

In retirement from playing Burke became involved in team management and coaching. He has served as a selector with the Tipperary minor, under-21 and senior teams.

== Honours ==
=== Player ===
Fethard

- Tipperary Senior Football Championship (5): 1984, 1988, 1993, 1997, 2001

Tipperary

- McGrath Cup (2): 1989, 1993
- Munster Minor Football Championship (1): 1984

Sporting positions
Preceded by Patrick McGrath	Tipperary Senior Football Captain; 1989	Succeeded by Donal O'Keeffe
Preceded by Philly Ryan	Tipperary Senior Football Captain; 1992	Succeeded by Seán Collum
