= Hampton Aces =

- City: Hampton, Virginia
- League: Eastern Hockey League (EHL)
- Founded: 1978
- Operated: 1979–1981
- Folded: 1981
- Home arena: Hampton Coliseum
- Colors: red, black and white

Franchise history
- 1978–1979: Jersey Aces
- 1979–1981: Hampton Aces

The Hampton Aces are a defunct professional ice hockey team that played in the Northeastern Hockey League during the 1978–79 season and the Eastern Hockey League in 1979-80.

== History ==
The team was initially based in Cherry Hill, New Jersey, and played its home games at the Cherry Hill Centrum (formerly Cherry Hill Arena), an arena that had previously served as home to the Jersey Knights of the World Hockey Association and the Jersey Devils of the Eastern Hockey League.

The team almost folded before it played its first game, as owner John Doherty proved to be underfinanced. However, Philadelphia Phillies third baseman Mike Schmidt stepped in and purchased a controlling interest in the franchise (Doherty later sued Schmidt for libel based on comments the new owner made about the old in the newspapers, but was unsuccessful).

The team—playing in the shadow of the successful Philadelphia Flyers of the National Hockey League and Philadelphia Firebirds of the North American Hockey League, and in a rink described by the team as "antiquated"—struggled to attract fans. By January 9, 1979, Schmidt moved the franchise to Hampton, Virginia, where it played its remaining 18 games in the Hampton Coliseum.

Coached by Murray MacPherson, the team compiled a record of 37 wins, 29 losses, and 3 ties in its first season of play. Among its players was ex-Philadelphia Flyers goaltender Michel Belhumeur.

The league rebranded as the Eastern Hockey League for the 1979-80 season. In their second year, the Aces were not as successful on the ice. McPherson led the team to a 17-49-4 record that year. Among the Aces that year was Neil Smith, who went on to serve as General Manager for the New York Rangers, building the team that won the Stanley Cup in 1994.

Larry Mickey coached the squad the next season, going 17-49-6. The team then folded with the rest of the league.
