= Utica Mohawks =

- City: Utica, New York
- League: Eastern Hockey League
- Operated: 1978–1980
- Colors: green, gold, white

Franchise history
- 1978–1980: Utica Mohawks
- 1980–1982: Salem Raiders
- 1982–1983: Virginia Raiders

The Utica Mohawks are a defunct professional ice hockey team that played from 1978 to 1980 in the Eastern Hockey League. Based in Utica, New York, the team played its home games at the Utica Memorial Auditorium. The team moved to Salem, Virginia and became the Salem Raiders for the 1980–81 season. The team would be replaced by the Mohawk Valley Stars the following season in the newly formed Atlantic Coast Hockey League.

Under head coaches Chuck Catto and Larry Mickey, the Mohawks compiled a two-season combined record of 57 wins, 77 losses, and 6 ties.
