= Eastern Hockey League (1978–1981) =

Defunct American professional ice hockey league

- Sport: Ice hockey
- Founded: 1978
- Folded: 1981
- No. of teams: 6
- Country: United States
- Last champion: Erie Blades (1980–81)
- Most titles: Erie Blades (3), (1978–79; 1979–80; 1980–81)

The Eastern Hockey League began operation in 1978 as the Northeastern Hockey League, filling the void in the former territory of the Eastern Hockey League.

Bill Beagan was named commissioner of the Northeastern Hockey League on June 14, 1979, to replace Jack Timmins who resigned. The league was rebranded as the Eastern Hockey League, which Beagan oversaw for two seasons until 1981. The league was not successful and after an owners' meeting on July 19, 1981, it was decided to fold the league.

Two of the teams – Baltimore Clippers and the Salem Raiders – joined the Atlantic Coast Hockey League in 1981. One team – the Erie Blades – joined the American Hockey League that same season. The remaining teams folded with the league and ceased operations.

== Teams ==
Team	Year Founded	Year Ended	Notes
Baltimore Clippers	1979	1981	League folded; joined the Atlantic Coast Hockey League (ACHL)
Erie Blades	1978	1981	Only team to win league championship (1978-79; 1979-80; 1980-81). The Blades joined the American Hockey League in 1981-82 and later merged with the Baltimore Skipjacks. A different franchise, the Erie Golden Blades, joined the ACHL in 1982.
Jersey/Hampton Aces	1978	1981	Franchise became defunct when the Eastern Hockey League folded
Johnstown Wings/Red Wings	1978	1980	Franchise ceased operations after the 1979-80 EHL season
New Hampshire/Cape Cod Freedoms	1978	1979	Franchise started season in New Hampshire before moving to Cape Cod midseason. Franchise ceased operations after 1978–79 season.
Richmond Rifles	1979	1981	Franchise became defunct when the Eastern Hockey League folded
Salem Raiders	1980	1981	Joined the Atlantic Coast Hockey League in 1981
Syracuse Hornets	1980	1981	Franchise folded after ten games, going 0–9–1
Utica Mohawks	1978	1980	Franchise moved to Salem, VA and became the Salem Raiders in 1980–81
