= List of Rensselaer Polytechnic Institute fraternities and sororities =

The following is a list of Rensselaer Polytechnic Institute fraternities and sororities. In 2016, the university ranked number fifteen on a list of the "frattiest" colleges in America, with thirty percent of its male students belonging to one of its 29 fraternities. As of the fall of 2023, that number had declined to sixteen percent of male undergraduates belonging to a fraternity and eleven percent of female undergraduates belonging to a sorority.

As of 2024, Rensselaer Polytechnic Institute's Fraternity & Sorority Commons (FSC) community includes four distinct clusters: the Interfraternity Council (IFC) with 23 active fraternities; the Multicultural Sorority & Fraternity Council (MSFC) with one sorority and three fraternities; the Rensselaer Panhellenic Council (RPC) with three sororities; and the Professional Fraternity/Sorority cluster with one fraternity and one sorority. The FSC is also working with several intercultural fraternities/sororities and NIC fraternities on their respective reactivation statuses.

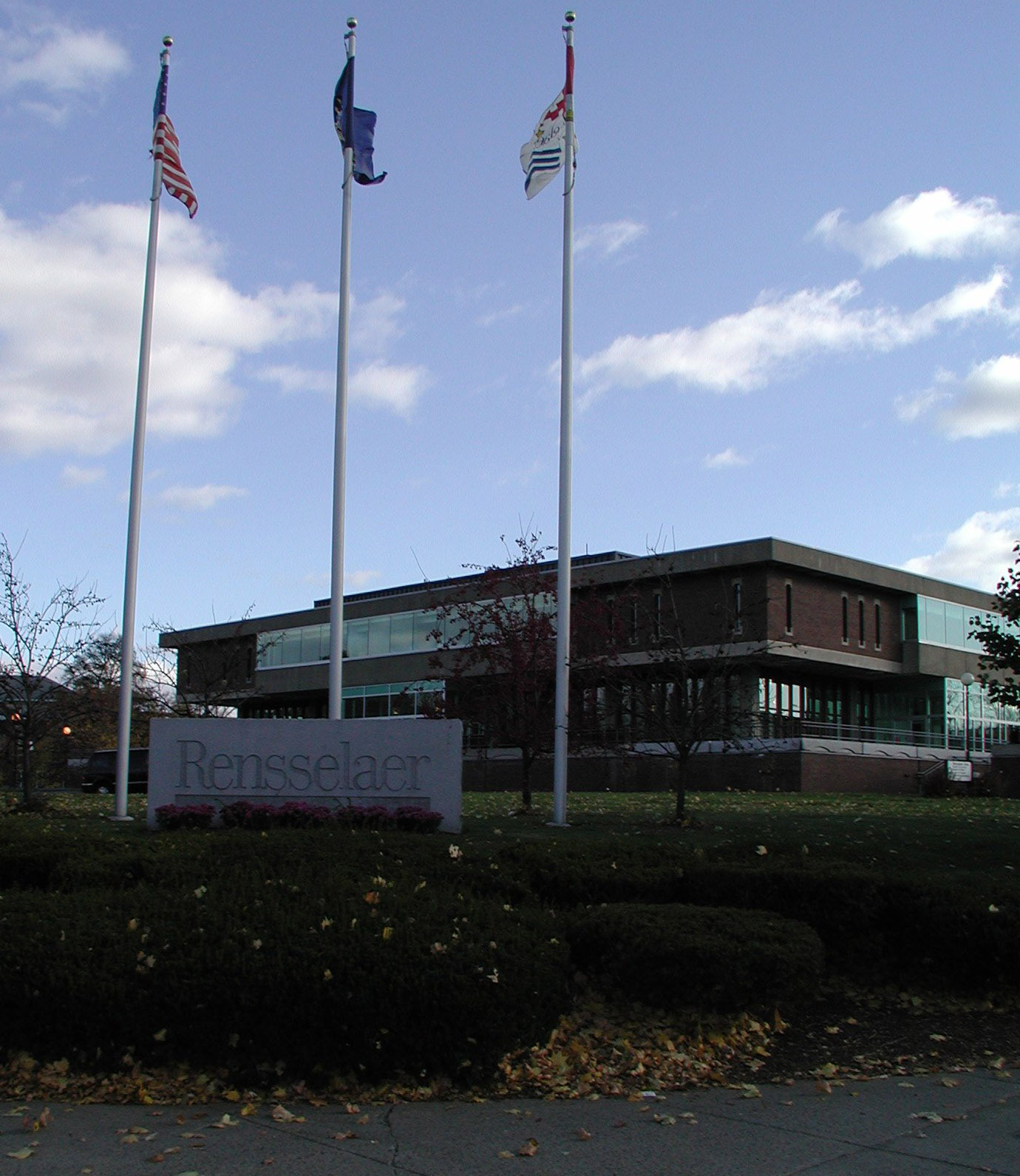
The RPI Union

== Active fraternities ==
The governing body of all fraternities is the Inter-Fraternity Council.

- Acacia, founded on April 10, 1949
- Alpha Chi Rho (ΑΧΡ; Crows), Delta Phi chapter, founded on October 23, 1948
- Alpha Epsilon Pi (ΑΕΠ), Rho Pi chapter, founded in 1951
- Alpha Phi Alpha (ΑΦΑ)
- Alpha Phi Omega (ΑΦΩ), Epsilon Zeta chapter (co-ed, not in IFC), founded on May 11, 1947 Serves as RPI's premier co-ed service fraternity. APO runs various campus-wide services out of their office on the third floor of the Student Union including Lost & Found, back exams, loaner technology, and information cards.
- Alpha Sigma Phi (ΑΣΦ; A-Sig), Beta Psi chapter founded in 1946. Alpha Sigma Phi was founded on December 6, 1845, at Yale College by Louis Manigault, Stephen Ormsby Rhea, and Horace Spangler Weiser. It was founded “to Better the Man through the creation and perpetuation of brotherhood founded upon the values of Character, Silence, Charity, Purity, Honor, and Patriotism.” The history of the Beta Psi chapter of Alpha Sigma Phi can be traced back to the founding of the Lambda chapter of Theta Nu Epsilon in 1882. Due to financial constraints from the Great Depression and dwindling numbers in membership, it merged with the Alpha Kappa chapter of Alpha Kappa Pi in 1940. After World War 2, Alpha Kappa Pi across the entire nation faced more trouble with membership and would finally merge with Alpha Sigma Phi in 1946, when the chapter at RPI became the Beta Psi chapter. The fraternity’s membership would be at stake again as the United States entered the Vietnam War, but the Beta Psi chapter would face its biggest challenge following its suspension from RPI and the National Organization in the 1990’s. This era of difficulty led to low membership. In local tradition and oral history, the brothers primarily responsible for the fraternity's resurgence were Jason Stern, Paul Lambeck, and Adam "Digby" Wells. The efforts of these three brothers are considered critically important to maintaining the chapter's traditions and ensuring its continued presence on RPI's campus. This is considered the re-founding of the Beta Psi chapter and is symbolic of Alpha Sigma Phi’s national symbol, the phoenix. Today, the lineage of all active brothers can be traced back to Stern and Lambeck. The Beta Psi chapter of Alpha Sigma Phi maintains a membership of approximately twenty brothers. The current chapter house is on 16 Belle Ave in Troy, NY. The house can act as a place where active brothers can choose to live in, host brotherhood events, and hold chapter meetings. The house is frequently visited by alumni and other friends of the house. The chapter is part of the Inter-Fraternity Council (IFC) on campus and remains in contact with the National Chapter of Alpha Sigma Phi. Additionally, the Beta Psi chapter also plans an annual 24-Hour Extra Life charity stream around the time of November to raise money for children’s hospitals.

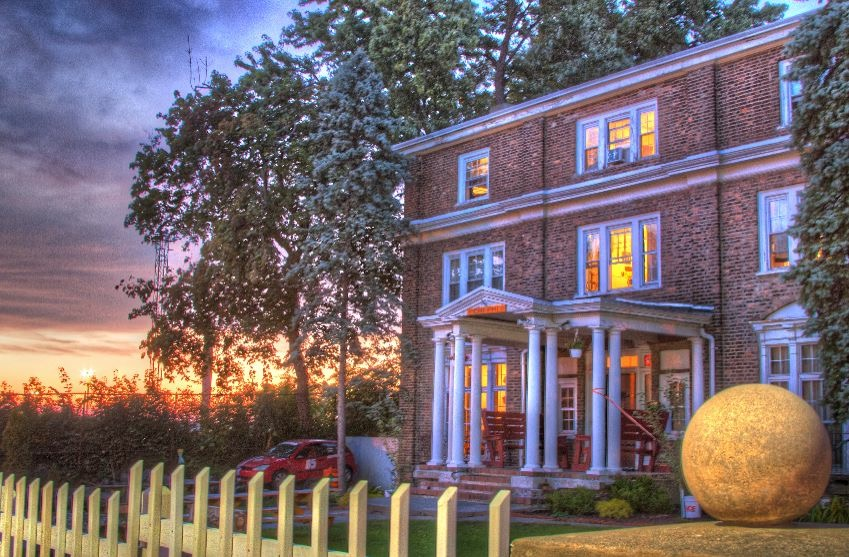
The Theta chapter of Chi Phi at Rensselaer Polytechnic Institute

- Chi Phi (ΧΦ), Theta chapter, founded in 1878. Theta chapter of Chi Phi is one of the oldest fraternities on campus and owns two houses next door to each other at 1981 and 1985 15th St., across from the Quad and Student Union. The Chi Phi house at 1981 15th Street was constructed in 1912 and is the oldest continually occupied fraternity house on RPI's campus. Notable alumni from Chi Phi at RPI include George Washington Gale Ferris Jr., inventor of the Ferris wheel, and Frank Osborn, founder of Osborn Engineering and designer of the original Yankee Stadium, Tiger Stadium, and Fenway Park. Chi Phi organizes the annual St. Baldrick's Foundation fundraiser for pediatric cancer research on RPI's campus that continually raises over $20,000 every year.
- Delta Kappa Epsilon (ΔΚΕ; Dekes), founded in 1867. DKE used to own the current admissions building located next to Theta Xi and across from both RSE and the Student Union.
- Delta Phi (ΔΦ), Lambda chapter, founded in 1864. Lambda chapter of Delta Phi is rich in Rensselaer history. Its members include three Rensselaer presidents (including George Low, known for putting the first man on the moon), and there are about sixteen structures on campus named after Delta Phi alumni. Such buildings include the George M. Low Building, Livingston Houston Fieldhouse, Cornelius Barton Hall, Nason Hall, Mason Lab (no longer in existence), Hearne Dormitory, Church I-VI and Caldwell Lab. Their chapter house is located at 311 Congress St. in Troy, NY, and is nicknamed "The Academy."
- Delta Tau Delta (ΔΤΔ; Delts), Upsilon chapter, founded in 1879. Upsilon chapter of Delta Tau Delta is located at 133 Sunset Terrace, neighboring Acacia and Phi Kappa Theta. The Delts' house is one of the largest on campus.
- Lambda Chi Alpha (ΛΧΑ), Epsilon Eta chapter, founded in 1937. Located at 200 Sunset Terrace. Formerly Delta Sigma Lambda, a local fraternity that was rechartered as Lambda Chi Alpha.
- Phi Gamma Delta (ΦΓΔ; FIJI), Tau Nu chapter, founded in 1984. Located at 82 3rd Street in Downtown Troy. Their house is the iconic 1st Baptist Church in Troy. They are the second fraternity to ever live in a church.
- Phi Iota Alpha (ΦΙΑ; Phiotas), Alpha chapter, founded on December 26, 1931. The Union Hispano-Americana was founded at RPI. It is the Oldest Hispanic-American student organization in the United States. The Latin American fraternity, Pi Delta Phi Fraternity, was founded at the Massachusetts Institute of Technology. It became Phi Lambda Alpha after merging with Union Hispano Americana at RPI in 1919. Phi Lambda Alpha became Phi Iota Alpha Fraternity in 1931. Delegates from Phi Lambda Alpha Fraternity (at RPI/Berkeley/MIT) and Sigma Iota Fraternity (Louisiana State) assembled at Troy, NY to form a strong and extensive Fraternity to address the needs of Latin Americans in universities in the US. It was then that Phi Iota Alpha was created. Today, the Fraternity has over 40 chapters.
- Phi Kappa Theta (ΦΚΘ; Ski Lodge), Sigma chapter, founded in 1925. The current house was designed by brother Robert Trudeau in 1971. It will always be the home of Apres Ski.
- Phi Mu Delta (ΦΜΔ; Phi Mud), Nu Theta chapter, founded in 1929
- Phi Sigma Kappa (ΦΣΚ; Phi Sig or Church), Gamma Tetarton chapter, founded October 14, 1950. Located at 316 Congress Street, at the corner of Congress Street and 13th Street, the Gamma Tetarton chapter of Phi Sigma Kappa is also the very first fraternity in the country to ever purchase and live in a church. Their house is one of the largest fraternity houses in the country, and is also the physically largest fraternity house on campus. The house was formerly the iconic St. Francis DeSales Church, which closed on February 1, 2009. The Gamma Tetarton chapter completed the purchase of the St. Francis DeSales Church on February 4, 2011. Shortly after their move-in, Phi Sig began the Mt. Ida Community Microgrant program. As neighbors dedicated to the growth, improvement, and future of the Mt. Ida community, Phi Sig sponsors the grant program to improve the “quality of life” in the Mt. Ida neighborhood. Homeowners, landlords, business owners, and non-profits are eligible to apply for a grant of up to the amount of $1,000 for home improvement, historic restoration, neighborhood beautification projects, and more.
- Pi Delta Psi (ΠΔΨ), Theta chapter, founded in 1997. Pi Delta Psi is currently the only Asian-interest Greek organization on campus.
- Pi Kappa Alpha (ΠΚΑ; Pikes)
- Pi Kappa Phi (ΠΚΦ; Pi Kapp or locally as Castle), Alpha Tau chapter, founded in 1906. Originally the local Fraternity, "The Rensselaer Technical Society", the chapter was incorporated in 1909 and rechartered in 1931 to form the Alpha Tau chapter of the national fraternity Pi Kappa Phi. Pi Kappa Phi "Castle" is located in its long-time home in the Central Troy Historic District, the Paine Mansion, where its castle-like façade and opulent interior gives the fraternity its nickname. The Paine Mansion finished construction in 1896 and is located at 49 2nd Street.
- Pi Lambda Phi (ΠΛΦ; Pilam), founded in 1954
- Psi Upsilon (ΨΥ; Psi U), Epsilon Iota chapter, founded on April 16, 1982. Originally the Epsilon Iota chapter of Tau Epsilon Phi(ΤΕΦ) Fraternity, the chapter officially seceded from TEP in January 1978 to become a co-ed local fraternity. Epsilon Iota officially became the 37th chapter of the Psi Upsilon international fraternity on April 16, 1982, and remains co-ed with an approximately equal number of male and female brothers. The chapter currently resides at 2140 Burdett Avenue in Troy. The chapter holds the record for the longest number of days (178) in "hockey line" at RPI, breaking the previous record of 33 days.
- Rensselaer Society of Engineering Innovation (RSEi), formally referred to locally as ‘’’Rensselaer Society of Engineers (RSE), founded 1866. Located at 1501 Sage Avenue. The Rensselaer Society of Engineers was founded as the Pi Eta scientific society in 1866, becoming the Rensselaer Society of Engineers in 1883. At 150 years old RSE is the oldest independent local fraternity at RPI. There are no other chapters. RSE's 1924 building is on the National Register of Historic Places.
- Sigma Chi (ΣΧ) Delta Psi chapter, founded on December 2, 1950. The Delta Psi chapter of The Sigma Chi Fraternity was chartered on December 2, 1950. Before that, Sigma Chi existed on the RPI campus as a local fraternity known as Phi Epsilon Phi. Sigma Chi is currently located at 58 Pinewoods Avenue.
- Sigma Alpha Epsilon (ΣΑΕ; SAE), New York Epsilon chapter, founded on December 8, 1951. The New York Epsilon chapter of Sigma Alpha Epsilon began as a local chapter in 1948, known as Lambda Alpha Epsilon, before being officially designated as Sigma Alpha Epsilon in 1951. The chapter received the 'Epsilon' designation in recognition of the chapter's founder, Forrest K. English '51. The chapter house was originally located at 7 Hawthorne Avenue before relocation to 12 Myrtle Avenue, which is known as the Thomson Mansion, and the former residence of Saul Chuckrow, former chicken magnate of Troy. Sigma Alpha Epsilon has remained at 12 Myrtle Avenue ever since.
- Sigma Phi Epsilon (ΣΦΕ; SigEp), New York Delta chapter, founded in 1938. Located at 2005 15th Street.
- Tau Epsilon Phi (ΤΕΦ; TEP), Epsilon Iota chapter, founded on December 8, 1957. Located at 1991 15th Street.
- Tau Kappa Epsilon (ΤΚΕ; TEKE), founded at RPI as the Gamma Epsilon chapter in 1949. Located at 1661 Tibbets Avenue, Troy, NY.
- Theta Xi (ΘΞ; or locally as Zoo), Alpha chapter, founded on April 29, 1864. Alpha chapter of Theta Xi is the oldest active fraternity at RPI. Distinguishable alumni include former RPI President Palmer C. Ricketts (A84), William H. Wiley (A11), Mordecai T. Endicott (A21), James Hall (A38), Emil H. Praeger (A272), and Allen B. Dumont (A349) all of which have been inducted into the RPI Hall of Fame. Numerous campus buildings and rooms are named after Alpha chapter alumni: the Darrin Communications Center, named after David M. Darrin (A566); Ricketts Building, named after Palmer C. Ricketts (A84); Waite Dormitory, named after Christopher Champlain Waite (A3) who is one of the fraternities founding members; Hall Hall named after James Hall (A83); DuMont room in the Student Union named after Allen B. DuMont (A349); and many more. The origin of the nickname "The Zoo" or just "Zoo" is rumored to be from the early 1960s when the Theta Xi brothers engaged in an altercation with another fraternity during an RPI hockey game. It is believed that RPI's newspaper, The Poly, stated in an article about the altercation that the brothers of Theta Xi acted like "a zoo". In December 2013, the chapter house was listed on the U.S. National Register of Historic Places. Theta Xi Fraternity Chapter House
- Zeta Psi (ΖΨ; Zetes), Pi chapter, founded on January 13, 1865. The Pi chapter went inactive in 1894 and was reactivated in 1951. It remained active until the alumni/elders shut down the chapter house in 1978 (for disciplinary reasons), reactivating the organization and its building in 1979 with all new members. Pi chapter has remained in continuous operation since the second reactivation. It is located at 25 Belle Avenue.

== Active sororities ==
The governing body of all sororities is the Panhellenic Council.

- Alpha Gamma Delta (ΑΓΔ), Zeta Eta chapter. Alpha Gamma Delta was founded on May 30, 1904, at Syracuse University and had 11 founders, women who were dedicated to creating a home where other women could foster lifelong friendships and growth, as well as connections for future opportunities. Alpha Gamma Delta sorority has established itself in almost 200 colleges, with nearly 200,000 sisters nationwide. Alpha Gamma Delta sorority is an international women’s organization that provides opportunities for personal development, and service to others, and allows sisters to pave their path, all while providing the bond of sisterhood. Alpha Gamma Delta’s philanthropy is fighting hunger, since nearly 1 in 8 Americans and 1 in 8 Canadians struggle with hunger, making this one of the biggest struggles of all time. Alpha Gamma Delta is partnered with Feeding America, a nonprofit organization that manages food banks nationwide, and Meals on Wheels, which is a similar organization that home-delivers food items to those in need. Alpha Gamma Delta sorority also works with local agencies near each of the chapters as well. Every February, chapters across the nation participate in a Week of Service, where they raise money for feeding initiatives as well as help collect and distribute food to those in need. The Alpha Gamma Delta flower is a red and buff rose with green asparagus plumosa fern. Alpha Gamma Delta’s jewel is the pearl. Alpha Gamma Delta’s colors are red, buff, and green. Their mascot is the squirrel, hence their nickname: “the nut house.” The Zeta Eta chapter of Alpha Gamma Delta is at Rensselaer Polytechnic Institute, located on Sherry Road in Troy, NY. The Zeta Eta chapter of Alpha Gamma Delta is one of the three big social sororities at Rensselaer Polytechnic Institute, and it has been able to maintain a respectable GPA throughout its existence at RPI.
- Alpha Phi (ΑΦ), Theta Tau chapter. Alpha Phi was founded at Syracuse University in 1872 by ten women and has since grown into an international organization with over 170 chapters across the U.S. and Canada. It is the first women’s fraternity that was founded in the Northeast. Alpha Phi considers itself a women’s fraternity because the founding date of the organization predates the invention of the term “sorority.” Alpha Phi’s philanthropy is women’s heart health, focusing on symptoms, treatment, and prevention of heart disease in women. The Theta Tau chapter of Alpha Phi at Rensselaer Polytechnic Institute originated as Phi Alpha Sigma, which was later colonized by the Alpha Phi International Fraternity in 1995. The Theta Tau chapter of Alpha Phi is located at 1 Forsyth Drive. Every year, the Alpha Phi house raises money for the Alpha Phi foundation through various means - Heart Health Week, Alpha Phifa, and the Red Dress Gala are just a few examples. Heart Health Week is during a specific week of the school year when sisters would table in various locations (usually the Student Union and the DCC) and sell various items ranging from snacks like brownies to items like scrunchies. Alpha Phifa is a soccer tournament that anyone can sign up for - all they have to do is make a team and pay a team fee. This event is very popular among the Greek houses at RPI, as they usually compete against one another to win. The Red Dress Gala is an annual Alpha Phi event (for all chapters) and is where parents can attend and choose to donate money. Money raised from any of these events or events outside of it is donated to the Alpha Phi Foundation, which in turn redirects to women’s heart health. Sisters of Alpha Phi also volunteer some hours at various places in Troy. Examples include the Troy Boys and Girls, the Troy Food Bank, and the animal shelter.
- Alpha Omega Epsilon (ΑΩΕ), the Tau chapter was founded on April 23, 2006. In the early 1980s, there was a national push to interest women in engineering. The female engineering students at Marquette University, including Little Sisters of both Sigma Phi Delta and Triangle Fraternities, started meeting in hopes of forming an organization to increase the number of women in engineering. They decided to form a sorority, and Alpha Omega Epsilon was founded on November 13, 1983. ΑΩΕ is a social and professional sorority focusing on supporting and empowering underrepresented genders in STEM. It is a member of the Professional Fraternity Association at the international level. Their international philanthropies are FIRST Robotics and the Alpha Omega Epsilon Foundation.
- Pi Beta Phi (ΠΒΦ), New York Epsilon chapter. Pi Beta Phi was founded by twelve women at Monmouth College in Monmouth, Illinois on April 28, 1867. Pi Beta Phi was the first women's fraternity to be modeled on the men's groups and the first to start a chapter at another college. Its mission is to promote friendship, develop women of intellect and integrity, cultivate leadership potential, and enrich lives through community service. At RPI, the chapter was originally founded as Kappa Phi on April 27, 1982. The first meeting was held in February 1982 in the dorm room of freshman roommates Yvette Ruiz Hober and Susan Mudrock Thompson. Ruiz would later become the first president and Thompson the first vice president of the organization. Its eleven charter members initially wrote to Pi Phi about national affiliation in 1982, and after establishing a membership of fifty women over two years, they became duly pledged members of Pi Beta Phi on September 4, 1984. They were then installed as the New York Epsilon chapter of Pi Beta Phi on November 17, 1984. The initiation ceremony took place at the First United Presbyterian Church of Troy and the installation banquet was held at Russell Sage Dining Hall. "Read > Lead > Achieve" is Pi Beta Phi’s philanthropic effort, which seeks to inspire a lifelong love of reading to create a more literate and productive society. The New York Epsilon chapter raises money for this foundation through numerous events including their annual Powder Puff game. From 1985 through 2019, the chapter held an annual fundraiser called Mr. RPI, involving members from the fraternities on campus. Their chapter house is located at 8 Sherry Road.
- Omega Phi Beta (ΩΦΒ; OPB), founded Summer 2021. Omega Phi Beta sorority is a multiethnically-based Greek-lettered organization embracing the diversity of all women. OPBSI was founded on March 15, 1989, by seventeen diverse women. The organization focuses on women's empowerment, academic achievement, professionalism, service, and diversity. Omega Phi Beta's philanthropy is "Raising awareness of violence against women", and their motto is "Serving and educating through our diversity." They form a part of the Multicultural Sorority and Fraternity Council.

== Literary societies ==
- Alpha Delta Phi Society (ΑΔΦ Society), founded 2015. ΑΔΦ is a literature and arts organization founded by Samuel Eels in 1832 at Hamilton College. Following disputes on female membership, the organization split into a male-only fraternity and a gender-inclusive society in 1992. The Rensselaer chapter of the Society was founded in 2015 and runs services out of the "Phi Space" in the '87 gym.

== Inactive fraternities and sororities ==
RPI has a history of establishing fraternities and sororities on its campus. As such, several fraternities have come and gone either due to merger with another entity or loss of recognition due to low membership or judicial incidents. For information regarding the conduct and sanctioning of current or past fraternities and sororities, please contact our office or the Dean of Students /Student Rights, Responsibilities, and Conduct.

To view the full list of organization(s) that have either completed or are currently completing sanctions as a result of investigations conducted by the organization's inter/national headquarters (HQ), the Dean of Students Office/ Student Rights, Responsibilities, and Conduct Institute (DOS/Conduct.), Fraternity & Sorority Commons (FSC), or a combination of the three. Visit our FSC Chapter Conduct & Judicial Status Judicial Status

=== Unrecognized fraternities ===
- Theta Chi (ΘΧ), Delta chapter (Suspended from May 2018 to July 2030). The organization currently resides in its former chapter house and operates as an unrecognized chapter. This group no longer has the rights and privileges of recognized student organizations and lacks affiliation, supervision, or advising from RPI. They are not subject to university oversight, do not follow the established rules for social Greek-letter organizations, and do not provide the university with the names of their members.

=== Inactive fraternities ===
Closed groups, whether eligible for return or not.

- Kappa Alpha Psi (ΚΑΨ), 1989-2009. Closed due to low membership
- Lambda Upsilon Lambda (ΛΥΛ), 1998-2013. Founded on November 14, 1998, Closed due to low membership
- Zeta Beta Tau (ΖΒΤ), 1962-2010. Closed due to low membership
- Phi Epsilon Pi (ΦΕΠ) 1961-1970. The Beta Delta chapter of Phi Epsilon Pi merged into Zeta Beta Tau in 1970, along with Phi Sigma Delta. The founding date is assumed to be 1961 because of the merger of Kappa Nu into Phi Epsilon Pi.
- Kappa Nu (ΚΝ) 1918-1962. Formed in 1918, the Kappa chapter of Kappa Nu merged into Phi Epsilon Pi in 1961.
- Phi Kappa Tau (ΦΚΤ), Rho chapter (Suspended from November 2016 to December 2021). The chapter is eligible for a return and is working with the FSC office to determine an opportune time for it. The chapter currently has a property, but the Alpha Gamma Delta sorority (ΑΓΔ) resides there.
- Phi Sigma Delta (ΦΣΔ) 1913-1962. Formed in 1913, the Gamma chapter of Phi Sigma Delta merged into Zeta Beta Tau in 1970.
- Sigma Delta (ΣΔ), 1859-1864. Local fraternity which disbanded soon after 8 members tendered their resignations in October 1863. Those 8 members became the founding members of Theta Xi in 1864 See: Sigma Delta forms Theta Xi. Not to be confused with Sigma Delta, the local multicultural sorority.
- Theta Delta Chi (ΘΔΧ), 1853-1896. The Delta Charge of Theta Delta Chi was RPI's first fraternity. Theta Delta Chi served as the sole fraternity on campus until the founding of Sigma Delta in 1859. The Charge had a prominent existence at Rensselaer throughout much of the 19th century until its charter was surrendered in 1896 because of low membership.

=== Inactive sororities ===
Closed groups, whether eligible for return or not.

- Phi Sigma Sigma (ΦΣΣ) founded in 1976. Phi Sigma Sigma was the first national nonsectarian sorority, founded by 10 women at Hunter College, NY in 1913. Their goal was to have membership open to all women of character regardless of background; a sorority committed to sisterhood, excellence in scholarship, and selfless giving. It is the only sorority that was open to diverse membership from inception and the only one with a ritual that was not based on any one religion. The Gamma Theta chapter was founded at RPI in 1976 as the first national sorority at the mostly male institution. The chapter became inactive in due to low membership.
- Sigma Delta (ΣΔ) founded on April 12, 1996. Sigma Delta is a local, multicultural sorority that was incorporated on March 29, 1996, and founded on April 12, 1996. While based on Latin American values, over the years they have grown to a multicultural organization with members from a variety of backgrounds and cultures. As of April 2020, the sorority has no undergraduate members.
- Sigma Iota Alpha (ΣΙΑ) Kappa chapter, founded on September 29, 1990. Sigma Iota Alpha is a Latina-oriented Greek letter intercollegiate and independent sorority, founded on September 29, 1990. The Kappa chapter was formed shortly after its founding, but is no longer active on RPI's campus.
