= Val James =

American ice hockey player (born 1957)

- Born: February 14, 1957 (age 69) Ocala, Florida, U.S.
- Height: 6 ft 2 in (188 cm)
- Weight: 205 lb (93 kg; 14 st 9 lb)
- Position: Left wing
- Shot: Left
- Played for: Buffalo Sabres; Toronto Maple Leafs
- NHL draft: 184th overall, 1977; Detroit Red Wings
- Playing career: 1978–1988

Valmore Curtis James (born February 14, 1957) is an American former professional ice hockey player who played 11 games in the National Hockey League (NHL) for the Buffalo Sabres and Toronto Maple Leafs between 1981 and 1986. The rest of his career, which lasted from 1978 to 1988, was spent in various minor leagues. He was the first African-American to play in the National Hockey League.

== Early life ==
James was born in Ocala, Florida and raised in Hauppauge, New York. He was one of six children. James began skating and playing ice hockey in Commack, New York where his father was employed as the manager of an ice rink.

== Playing career ==
James was drafted by the Detroit Red Wings in the 16th round, 184th overall in the 1977 NHL entry draft after playing two seasons in the Quebec Major Junior Hockey League (QMJHL) for the Quebec Remparts, although he never played in any regulation games for the Red Wings. He also played several seasons, in the late 1970s, for the Erie Blades, in the Eastern Hockey League (EHL). James's propensity for using hip checks garnered notoriety in the Erie County Field House, home of the Blades. He signed with the Buffalo Sabres on July 22, 1981. James made his NHL debut for the Sabres during the 1981–82 NHL season, playing seven games. James became the first Black American to play in the NHL when he debuted with the Sabres. He was not the first Black American to be exclusively trained in the country; that milestone did not occur until 1996, when Mike Grier made his NHL debut. James was the first native-born Floridian to play in the NHL.

In 1983, while playing in the American Hockey League (AHL), under the direction of rookie coach Mike Keenan, James scored the winning goal for the Rochester Americans in the Calder Cup.

James' next NHL stint came in the 1986–87 NHL season with the Toronto Maple Leafs, playing four games. As an African-American, James often faced situations at all levels of his career where he was the victim of incidents of racial prejudice from opposing fans, and, sometimes, opposing players.

On the ice, James became revered for his fighting ability. Spirited bouts and victories over noted enforcers Terry O'Reilly and John Kordic were part of his record. One of the NHL's all-time top enforcers, Dave Brown, singled out James as one of the hardest punching players, and toughest opponents, he had ever fought. After 14 professional NHL hockey games, a shoulder injury forced James to retire from the sport in 1988. After retirement, he taught hockey for 10 years.

== Post-hockey life ==
After retiring, James settled in the Niagara Region with his wife. His autobiography Black Ice: The Val James Story was released by ECW Press for worldwide distribution in February 2015, coinciding with Black History Month. In January 2017 ECW Press re-released the book in paperback format, again coinciding with Black History Month.

== Career statistics ==
=== Regular season and playoffs ===
			Regular season					Playoffs
Season	Team	League	GP	G	A	Pts	PIM	GP	G	A	Pts	PIM
1973–74	Midland Athletics	MOJHL	—	—	—	—	—	—	—	—	—	—
1975–76	Quebec Remparts	QMJHL	72	14	19	33	78	15	0	6	6	42
1975–76	Quebec Remparts	M-Cup	—	—	—	—	—	3	1	0	1	@
1976–77	Quebec Remparts	QMJHL	68	16	16	32	89	10	1	1	2	48
1978–79	Erie Blades	NEHL	67	14	26	40	112	—	—	—	—	—
1979–80	Erie Blades	EHL	69	12	13	25	117	9	0	1	1	34
1980–81	Erie Blades	EHL	70	3	18	21	179	6	1	3	4	30
1980–81	Rochester Americans	AHL	3	0	0	0	12	—	—	—	—	—
1981–82	Buffalo Sabres	NHL	7	0	0	0	16	3	0	0	0	0
1981–82	Rochester Americans	AHL	65	5	4	9	204	6	0	2	2	16
1982–83	Rochester Americans	AHL	68	3	4	7	88	16	1	0	1	27
1983–84	Rochester Americans	AHL	62	1	2	3	122	18	0	1	1	10
1984–85	Rochester Americans	AHL	55	1	4	5	70	3	0	0	0	15
1985–86	St. Catharines Saints	AHL	80	0	3	3	162	13	1	1	2	53
1986–87	Toronto Maple Leafs	NHL	4	0	0	0	14	—	—	—	—	—
1986–87	Newmarket Saints	AHL	74	4	3	7	71	—	—	—	—	—
1987–88	Flint Spirits	IHL	8	2	0	2	26	—	—	—	—	—
1987–88	Baltimore Skipjacks	AHL	9	0	0	0	1	—	—	—	—	—
AHL totals			416	14	20	34	740	56	2	4	6	121
NHL totals			11	0	0	0	30	3	0	0	0	0

== See also ==
- Willie O'Ree, first Black Canadian player in the NHL
