= Gary Conn =

American ice hockey player

- Born: July 22, 1959 (age 67) Salem, Massachusetts, USA
- Height: 5 ft 11 in (180 cm)
- Weight: 185 lb (84 kg; 13 st 3 lb)
- Position: Center
- Shot: Right
- Played for: Maine; Fitchburg Trappers; Baltimore Skipjacks; Hampton Roads Gulls; Erie Golden Blades; Virginia Raiders
- Playing career: 1977–1983

Gary Conn is an American retired ice hockey center who was an All-American for Maine.

== Career ==
Conn was a member of Maine's first recruiting class when the ice hockey program was revived in 1977. The Black Bears started out in Division II and saw some success with Conn as leading scorer in his freshman season. The next season, Maine finished in the top three in their 16-team division and made the postseason. Conn again led the team in scoring, this time with 65 points, and was named to the All-Conference team. Maine received the top seed in the ECAC 2 Tournament and won their first playoff game but were upset in the semifinals.

After their 25-win season, the program was promoted to Division I and jumped straight into ECAC Hockey. Conn led the team in scoring for the third consecutive year, though with 20 fewer points and the Black Bears finished with a losing record. Just as they had in D-II, Maine won over 20 games in their second year and made the postseason. Conn led all Black Bear scorers once again and was named an All-American. Conn's was inducted into the Maine Athletic Hall of Fame in 1989.

After graduating, Conn spent time with five different professional teams over two seasons in the new Atlantic Coast Hockey League. He retired after the 1983 season.

== Statistics ==
=== Regular season and playoffs ===
			Regular Season					Playoffs
Season	Team	League	GP	G	A	Pts	PIM	GP	G	A	Pts	PIM
1977–78	Maine	ECAC 2	27	21	27	48	10	—	—	—	—	—
1978–79	Maine	ECAC 2	34	35	30	65	—	—	—	—	—	—
1979–80	Maine	ECAC Hockey	32	21	24	45	34	—	—	—	—	—
1980–81	Maine	ECAC Hockey	34	30	33	63	26	—	—	—	—	—
1981–82	Fitchburg Trappers	ACHL	6	4	3	7	11	—	—	—	—	—
1981–82	Baltimore Skipjacks	ACHL	36	23	23	46	36	7	7	4	11	24
1982–83	Hampton Roads Gulls	ACHL	1	0	0	0	0	—	—	—	—	—
1982–83	Erie Golden Blades	ACHL	3	1	0	1	0	—	—	—	—	—
1982–83	Virginia Raiders	ACHL	8	1	4	5	16	4	0	1	1	0
NCAA totals			127	107	114	221	—	—	—	—	—	—
ACHL totals			54	29	30	59	63	11	7	5	12	24

== Awards and honors ==
Award	Year
All-ECAC 2	1978–79
All-ECAC Hockey First Team	1980–81
AHCA East All-American	1980–81
