= Daryl MacLeod =

American ice hockey player

- Born: February 10, 1960 (age 65); Charlestown, Massachusetts, USA
- Height: 5 ft 10 in (178 cm)
- Weight: 185 lb (84 kg; 13 st 3 lb)
- Position: Left wing
- Shot: Left
- Played for: Boston University; Wichita Wind; Muskegon Mohawks; Montana Magic; SaiPa
- NHL draft: 85th overall, 1978; Boston Bruins
- Playing career: 1981–1986

Daryl MacLeod is an American former ice hockey player. He won a national championship with Boston University before embarking on a professional career.

== Career ==
MacLeod began attending Boston University after graduating from New Hampton School in 1977. In his freshman season, he helped the university's Terriers team compile one of the best records in program history, going 25–1 in the regular season. The team's championship hopes were seemingly dashed when they lost in the conference semifinals; however, the NCAA was able to add extra teams to the NCAA tournament at the time and Boston was allowed to participate. The Terriers ended up winning the tournament that year and MacLeod's physical play caught the eye of several scouts. That summer, the Boston Bruins selected MacLeod in the 5th round of the NHL draft. Over the next three years, MacLeod increased his offensive output with the Terriers but did so only at a modest pace.

After serving as team captain during his senior season, MacLeod was not offered a contract by the Bruins and became a free agent. He signed his first professional contract with the newly founded Cape Cod Buccaneers. MacLeod was one of the team's top scorers and, though the season was ended abruptly by the dissolution of the franchise, he had performed well enough to receive additional offers and finished the year with the Wichita Wind. MacLeod began his second year of professional hockey in the Central Hockey League but spent most of the season with the Muskegon Mohawks in the IHL. He provided consistent depth scoring for the club but found himself demoted back to the CHL for year three. After just 6 games, he travelled to Finland, where he had a short stint with SaiPa.

MacLeod finished his professional career by playing parts of two seasons with the Virginia Lancers. He retired as a player in 1986.

== Career statistics ==
=== Regular season and playoffs ===
			Regular Season					Playoffs
Season	Team	League	GP	G	A	Pts	PIM	GP	G	A	Pts	PIM
1977–78	Boston University	ECAC Hockey	31	3	9	12	33	—	—	—	—	—
1978–79	Boston University	ECAC Hockey	30	8	8	16	40	—	—	—	—	—
1979–80	Boston University	ECAC Hockey	26	9	15	24	56	—	—	—	—	—
1980–81	Boston University	ECAC Hockey	29	10	17	27	56	—	—	—	—	—
1981–82	Cape Cod Buccaneers	ACHL	27	12	15	27	59	—	—	—	—	—
1981–82	Wichita Wind	CHL	17	4	6	10	25	—	—	—	—	—
1982–83	Wichita Wind	CHL	2	0	0	0	5	—	—	—	—	—
1982–83	Muskegon Mohawks	IHL	65	19	27	46	77	4	0	1	1	0
1983–84	Montana Magic	CHL	6	0	1	1	2	—	—	—	—	—
1983–84	SaiPa Lappeenranta	SM-liiga	7	0	1	1	4	—	—	—	—	—
1984–85	Virginia Lancers	ACHL	39	16	33	49	24	4	1	6	7	0
1985–86	Virginia Lancers	ACHL	1	3	1	4	0	5	0	1	1	6
NCAA Totals			116	30	49	79	185	—	—	—	—	—
ACHL Totals			67	31	49	80	83	9	1	7	8	6
CHL Totals			25	4	7	11	32	—	—	—	—	—
