= Jim Stewart (ice hockey) =

American ice hockey player (born 1957)

- Born: April 23, 1957 (age 67); Cambridge, Massachusetts, U.S.
- Height: 5 ft 10 in (178 cm)
- Weight: 170 lb (77 kg; 12 st 2 lb)
- Position: Goaltender
- Caught: Left
- Played for: NHL; Boston Bruins; AHL; Binghamton Dusters; Springfield Indians; Binghamton Whalers
- NHL draft: Undrafted
- Playing career: 1979–1982

James M. Stewart, Jr. (born April 23, 1957) is an American former professional ice hockey goaltender who played in one National Hockey League game for the Boston Bruins during the 1979–80 NHL season. His lone game was on January 10, 1980 against the St. Louis Blues. He gave up 3 goals in the first 4 minutes and 5 goals in the first period. He was replaced by fellow rookie Marco Baron in the second period and never played in the NHL again.

Stewart played hockey for St. John's High School and College of the Holy Cross.

== Career statistics ==
=== Regular season and playoffs ===
			Regular season									Playoffs
Season	Team	League	GP	W	L	T	MIN	GA	SO	GAA	SV%	GP	W	L	MIN	GA	SO	GAA	SV%
1974–75	College of the Holy Cross	NCAA II	—	—	—	—	—	—	—	—	—	—	—	—	—	—	—	—	—
1975–76	College of the Holy Cross	NCAA II	—	—	—	—	—	—	—	—	—	—	—	—	—	—	—	—	—
1976–77	South Shore Whalers	NEJHL	44	—	—	—	2336	156	1	4.01	—	—	—	—	—	—	—	—	—
1977–78	Cape Cod Freedoms	NEHL	1	0	1	0	60	6	0	6.00	—	—	—	—	—	—	—	—	—
1977–78	College of the Holy Cross	NCAA II	15	10	5	0	905	51	—	3.37	—	—	—	—	—	—	—	—	—
1978–79	College of the Holy Cross	NCAA II	5	1	4	0	316	22	—	4.19	—	—	—	—	—	—	—	—	—
1979–80	Boston Bruins	NHL	1	0	1	0	20	5	0	15.00	.444	—	—	—	—	—	—	—	—
1979–80	Binghamton Dusters	AHL	13	4	6	2	690	46	0	4.00	.880	—	—	—	—	—	—	—	—
1979–80	Utica Mohawks	EHL	30	—	—	—	1673	122	3	4.38	—	2	0	1	80	12	0	9.00	—
1980–81	Springfield Indians	AHL	3	0	3	0	180	14	0	4.67	.868	—	—	—	—	—	—	—	—
1980–81	Indianapolis Checkers	CHL	3	1	1	1	140	11	1	4.71	.859	—	—	—	—	—	—	—	—
1980–81	Salem Raiders	EHL	16	—	—	—	892	69	0	4.64	—	—	—	—	—	—	—	—	—
1980–81	Saginaw Gears	IHL	3	—	—	—	153	16	0	6.27	—	—	—	—	—	—	—	—	—
1981–82	Binghamton Whalers	AHL	4	1	3	0	240	17	0	4.25	—	1	0	0	9	1	0	6.67	—
1981–82	Nashville South Stars	CHL	3	1	1	0	110	8	0	4.37	.778	—	—	—	—	—	—	—	—
1981–82	Cape Cod Buccaneers	ACHL	26	—	—	—	1410	98	0	4.17	—	—	—	—	—	—	—	—	—
1981–82	Baltimore Skipjacks	ACHL	7	—	—	—	370	16	0	2.59	—	7	—	—	392	36	0	5.51	—
NHL totals			1	0	1	0	20	5	0	15.00	.444	—	—	—	—	—	—	—	—

== See also ==
- List of players who played only one game in the NHL
