= Greg Tebbutt =

Canadian ice hockey player (1957–2021)

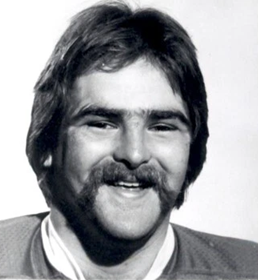
- Tebbutt in 1978 photo
- Born: May 11, 1957 North Vancouver, British Columbia, Canada
- Died: December 17, 2021 (aged 64)
- Height: 6 ft 2 in (188 cm)
- Weight: 243 lb (110 kg; 17 st 5 lb)
- Position: Defence
- Shot: Left
- Played for: Birmingham Bulls (WHA); Quebec Nordiques; Pittsburgh Penguins
- NHL draft: 130th overall, 1977; Minnesota North Stars
- WHA draft: 49th overall, 1977; Birmingham Bulls
- Playing career: 1978–1988

Gregory A. "Truck" Tebbutt (May 11, 1957 – December 17, 2021) was a Canadian professional ice hockey player. He played 26 games in the National Hockey League with the Quebec Nordiques and Pittsburgh Penguins during the 1979–80 and 1983–84 seasons. The rest of his career, which lasted from 1978 to 1988, was spent in the minor leagues. A defenceman, he was a rugged enforcer in his own end who also put up solid offensive numbers in junior and the minors.

== Life and playing career ==
Born in North Vancouver, British Columbia, Tebbutt played junior with the Victoria Cougars, Flin Flon Bombers and Regina Pats in the WCJHL, from 1975 to 1978. He was drafted 130th overall by the Minnesota North Stars in 1977. After scoring 28 goals for the Flin Flon Bombers in 1977-78, Tebbutt split the next year between the Binghamton Dusters and the World Hockey Association (WHA) Birmingham Bulls.

Following the WHA/NHL merger, Tebbutt was claimed on waivers by the Nordiques. Apart from his two-game stint in the NHL he was a solid minor leaguer for the next four years and topped the 20-goal mark twice. In July 1983, Tebbutt signed with Pittsburgh and played 24 games in the 1983–84 season. Following this he returned to the minors before retiring. During the mid-1980s he reached the 200 penalty minute mark and scored 20 goals in three straight seasons in the IHL. Tebbutt's last season was in 1987–88 with the Baltimore Skipjacks of the AHL. He died on December 17, 2021, at the age of 64.

== Career statistics ==
=== Regular season and playoffs ===
			Regular season					Playoffs
Season	Team	League	GP	G	A	Pts	PIM	GP	G	A	Pts	PIM
1975–76	Victoria Cougars	WCHL	51	3	4	7	217	15	2	0	2	43
1976–77	Victoria Cougars	WCHL	29	7	12	19	98	—	—	—	—	—
1976–77	Regina Pats	WCHL	40	8	17	25	138	—	—	—	—	—
1977–78	Flin Flon Bombers	WCHL	55	28	46	74	270	15	11	17	28	45
1978–79	Binghamton Dusters	AHL	33	8	9	17	50	—	—	—	—	—
1978–79	Birmingham Bulls	WHA	38	2	5	7	83	—	—	—	—	—
1979–80	Quebec Nordiques	NHL	2	0	1	1	4	—	—	—	—	—
1979–80	Syracuse Firebirds	AHL	14	2	3	5	35	—	—	—	—	—
1979–80	Erie Blades	EHL	48	20	53	73	138	9	11	12	23	32
1980–81	Erie Blades	EHL	35	16	37	53	93	8	0	12	12	28
1981–82	Fort Wayne Komets	IHL	49	13	34	47	148	9	3	1	4	16
1982–83	Baltimore Skipjacks	AHL	80	28	56	84	140	—	—	—	—	—
1983–84	Pittsburgh Penguins	NHL	24	0	2	2	31	—	—	—	—	—
1983–84	Baltimore Skipjacks	AHL	44	12	42	54	125	10	0	6	6	20
1984–85	Baltimore Skipjacks	AHL	2	0	0	0	4	—	—	—	—	—
1984–85	Muskegon Lumberjacks	IHL	73	23	55	78	220	17	3	9	12	87
1985–86	Milwaukee Admirals	IHL	77	20	49	69	226	5	0	3	3	8
1986–87	Saginaw Generals	IHL	81	27	59	86	215	8	6	5	11	34
1987–88	Baltimore Skipjacks	AHL	24	1	14	15	72	—	—	—	—	—
AHL totals			197	51	124	175	426	10	0	6	6	20
IHL totals			280	83	197	280	809	39	12	18	30	145
WHA totals			38	2	5	7	83	—	—	—	—	—
NHL totals			26	0	3	3	35	—	—	—	—	—
