= Rob Laird =

Rob Laird may refer to:

- Rob Laird (ice hockey) (born 1954), ice hockey player
- Rob Laird (Drive), a character in Drive
