= Jim Troy =

Jim Troy may refer to:

- Jim Troy (ice hockey) (born 1953), American ice hockey player from 1975 to 1982
- Jim Troy (hurler) (born 1960), retired Irish hurler
