= William O. Hotchkiss =

American academic (1878–1954)

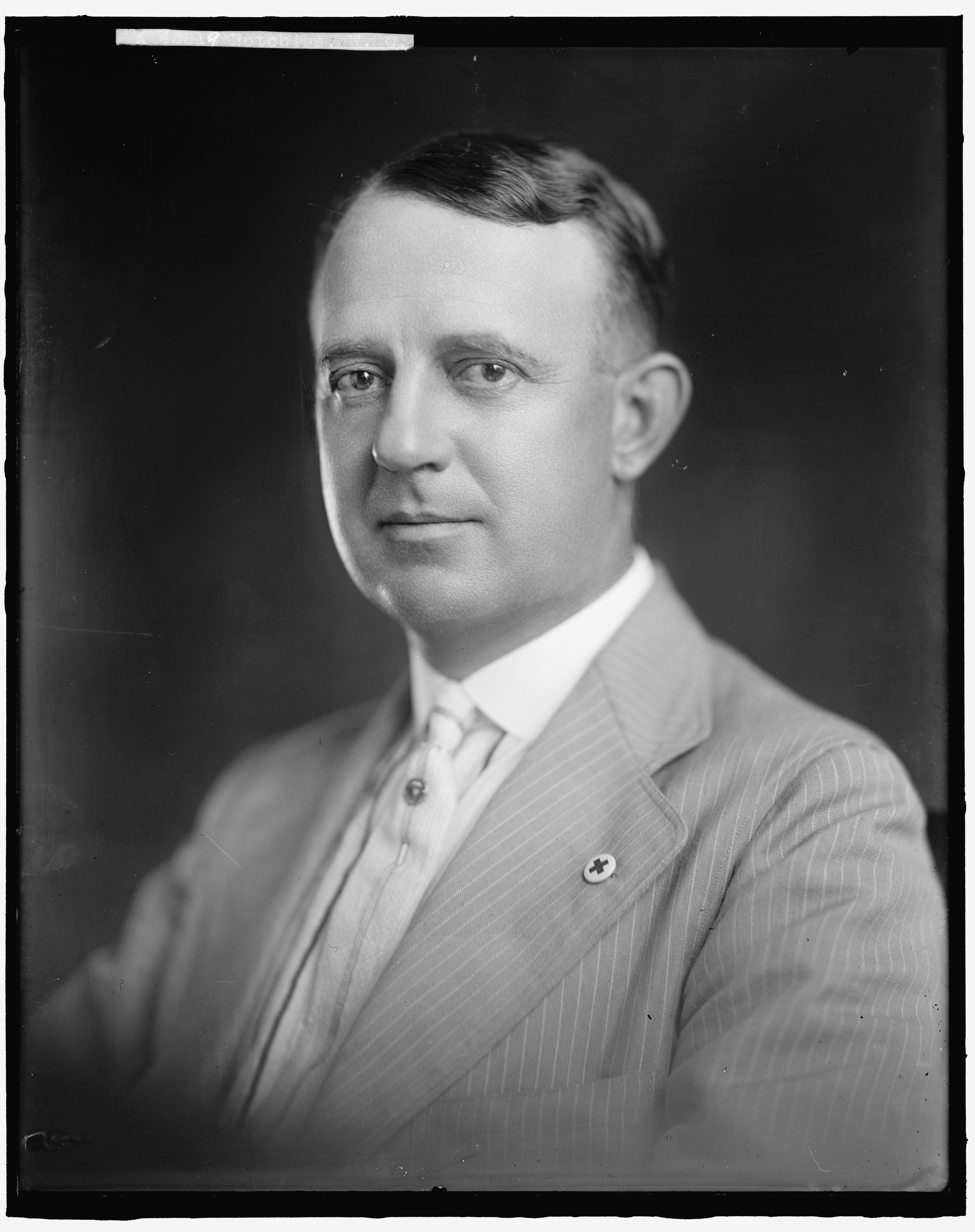

William Otis Hotchkiss (September 17, 1878 – June 20, 1954) was the third president of Michigan Technological University and the tenth president of Rensselaer Polytechnic Institute.

== Biography ==
He was born in Eau Claire, Wisconsin on September 17, 1878. He earned a geology degree in 1903, a civil engineering degree in 1908 and a Ph.D. in 1916, all from the University of Wisconsin–Madison.

He served as state geologist in Wisconsin from 1909 to 1925. He wrote publications including Rural Highways of Wisconsin, Limestone Road Materials of Wisconsin, and Geological and Road Map of Wisconsin and served on several state and federal geology committees, as well as president of the Association of American State Geologists. The Wisconsin state highway commission was created during his tenure and he served on it between 1911 and 1925. In 1925, he was appointed president of the Michigan Mining School. During his tenure, the school added programs in chemical, civil, electrical and mechanical engineering and a program in forestry. In 1927, the school changed its name to the Michigan College of Mining and Technology and is now known as Michigan Technological University.

In 1935, he was appointed president of Rensselaer. In 1943, he retired at the age of 65 but remained president emeritus. He died on June 20, 1954.

Academic offices
Preceded by Fred W. McNair	President of Michigan Technological University; 1925 – 1935	Succeeded by Grover C. Dillman
Preceded by Palmer C. Ricketts	President of Rensselaer Polytechnic Institute; 1935 – 1943	Succeeded by Livingston W. Houston
