= Jim Troy (ice hockey) =

American ice hockey player, coach, and general manager

- Born: January 21, 1953 (age 73) Boston, Massachusetts, U.S.
- Height: 6 ft 2 in (188 cm)
- Weight: 205 lb (93 kg; 14 st 9 lb)
- Position: Forward
- Shot: Right
- Played for: WHA; New England Whalers; Edmonton Oilers; AHL; Rhode Island Reds; New Haven Nighthawks; Philadelphia Firebirds; NAHL; Beauce Jaros; Erie Blades; Binghamton Dusters; ACHL; Cape Cod Buccaneers
- NHL draft: Undrafted
- Playing career: 1975–1982

Jim Troy (born January 21, 1953) is a retired American professional ice hockey player, coach, and general manager as well as a former professional wrestling executive and boxing manager and promoter.

== Hockey career ==
Over three seasons, from 1975 to 1978, Troy played 68 regular season games in the World Hockey Association with the New England Whalers and Edmonton Oilers. He then played in the American Hockey League for the Philadelphia Firebirds and New Haven Nighthawks. In 1980 he became an assistant coach with the Nighthawks.

== World Wrestling Federation ==
Troy was hired by Vince McMahon to be the head coach and general manager of the Cape Cod Buccaneers for their inaugural season 1981-82 season in the Atlantic Coast Hockey League. In their only season in the ACHL, the Buccaneers went 17-21-1. After the Buccaneers folded, Troy remained with McMahon as senior vice president of Titan Sports, Inc. In 1983, he helped McMahon purchase the WWF from his father, Vince McMahon, Sr. Later that year, Troy reached an agreement with USA to replace Southwest Championship Wrestling on the network's schedule. The deal allowed the WWF to be broadcast to 24 million homes a week (29% of homes that had cable). In 1987, he helped convince McMahon to test the pay-per-view market. He resigned from the company in 1989, following a physical altercation with wrestler Koko B. Ware on a European tour. After taunting Ware over being a 'fake tough guy', Troy and Ware got into a brawl in a Belgian hotel, crashing through a glass wall and leaving the lobby covered in blood.

== Boxing ==
After leaving the WWF, Troy worked as a boxing manager and promoter. Fighters he managed included Ebo Elder, Robert Allen, and Jason Pires. He also served as an executive producer for Mike Jarrell Promotions and ESPN.

== Career statistics ==
=== Regular season and playoffs ===
			Regular season					Playoffs
Season	Team	League	GP	G	A	Pts	PIM	GP	G	A	Pts	PIM
1974–75	Waltham Habs	NEnHL	Statistics Unavailable
1975–76	Beauce Jaros	NAHL	49	12	22	34	201	1	1	0	1	2
1975–76	New England Whalers	WHA	14	0	0	0	43	2	0	0	0	29
1976–77	Beauce Jaros	NAHL	25	6	8	14	104	––	––	––	––	––
1976–77	Erie Blades	NAHL	5	1	0	1	2	––	––	––	––	––
1976–77	Broome County Dusters	NAHL	24	1	12	13	43	10	0	1	1	32
1976–77	Rhode Island Reds	AHL	5	0	0	0	7	––	––	––	––	––
1976–77	New England Whalers	WHA	7	0	0	0	7	––	––	––	––	––
1977–78	New Haven Nighthawks	AHL	31	2	1	3	57	––	––	––	––	––
1977–78	Edmonton Oilers	WHA	47	2	0	2	124	2	0	0	0	0
1978–79	New Haven Nighthawks	AHL	35	3	7	10	57	––	––	––	––	––
1978–79	Philadelphia Firebirds	AHL	34	2	2	4	88	––	––	––	––	––
1980–81	New Haven Nighthawks	AHL	8	0	1	1	23	––	––	––	––	––
1981–82	Cape Cod Buccaneers	ACHL	3	0	0	0	31	––	––	––	––	––
WHA totals			68	2	0	2	174	4	0	0	0	29
