= Grover C. Dillman =

American academic administrator (1889–1979)

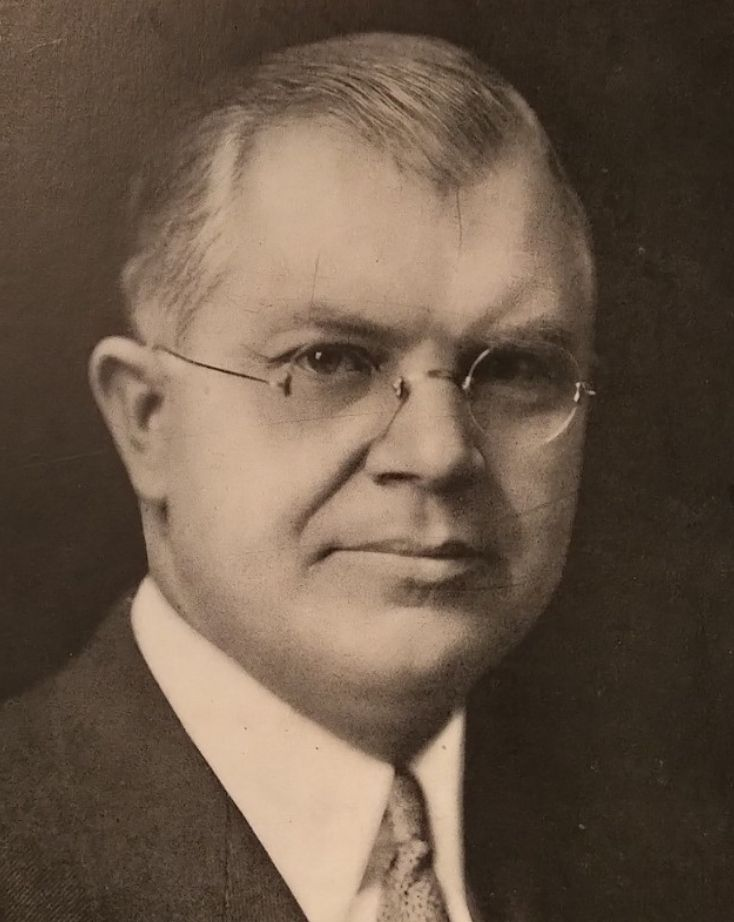

4th President of the Michigan College of Mining and Technology
- In office August 15, 1935 – 1956
- Preceded by: William O. Hotchkiss
- Succeeded by: J. Robert Van Pelt

Director of the Michigan State Welfare Department
- In office January 1, 1935 – August 15, 1935
- Governor: Frank Fitzgerald

Director of Public Service of Grand Rapids
- In office July 1, 1933 – January 1, 1935

4th Michigan State Highway Commissioner
- In office April 1929 – June 30, 1933
- Governor: Fred W. Green; Wilber M. Brucker
- Preceded by: Frank F. Rogers
- Succeeded by: Murray Van Wagoner

Deputy Michigan State Highway Commissioner
- In office June 1922 – January 1, 1929
- Governor: Alex J. Groesbeck; Fred W. Green

Personal details
- Born: July 18, 1889 Bangor, Michigan, U.S.
- Died: April 14, 1979 (aged 89) Flint, Michigan, U.S
- Resting place: Arlington Hill Cemetery
- Party: Republican
- Spouse: Anne Broadwell (m. 1914; died 1969)
- Children: 2
- Education: Michigan Agricultural College (BS)
- Occupation: Engineer

Grover Cleveland Dillman (July 18, 1889 – April 14, 1979) was an American engineer and politician who was the President of the Michigan College of Mining and Technology (now known as the Michigan Technological University) from 1933 to 1956. Dillman held several positions in the Michigan state government over a 20-year career as an engineer for the State Highway Department, most notably as the elected state highway commissioner from 1929 to 1933.

== Early life and education ==
Dillman was born on July 18, 1889, in Bangor Township, Van Buren County, Michigan. He attended elementary schools in rural Wood School (one room) in Bangor Township Van Buren County, and graduated from Bangor High School in 1909. He attended the Michigan Agricultural College, receiving a Bachelor of Science in civil engineering in 1913.

== Michigan State Highway Department ==
Shortly after graduating from the Michigan Agricultural College in 1913, Dillman became an engineer for the Michigan State Highway Department, working in the Upper Peninsula. He quickly rose through the ranks, becoming a state maintenance engineer in 1920, and the deputy state highway commissioner in 1922, a position he held until 1929.

=== State Highway Commissioner ===
In 1929, Dillman was elected Michigan state highway commissioner as a member of the Republican Party. His time in office was marked by the Great Depression, which left millions of Americans without work. Dillman established a program which put an estimated 100,000 people to work on highways, reducing unemployment in the state by approximately 6%. Dillman announced his candidacy for the Highway Commissioners position on January 19, 1933, but was defeated in the April 3, 1933, election by the Democratic machine in Detroit and Lansing.

== Later career ==
On July 1, 1933, the day after he left office as state highway commissioner, Dillman was appointed as the director of public service for the City of Grand Rapids. He held that position until 1935, when he was appointed by Governor Frank Fitzgerald as the director of the State Welfare Department. Dillman held the office for only eight months, as he resigned to assume the presidency of the Michigan College of Mining and Technology.

== President of the Michigan College of Mining and Technology ==
Dillman took office as president of the Michigan College of Mining and Technology on August 15, 1935, succeeding William O. Hotchkiss. His presidency saw significant changes in the college, most notably the creation of a branch campus in Sault Ste. Marie. Under Dillman's leadership, the college procured the village of Alberta, establishing the Ford Forestry Center and Research Forest in 1954.

In 1952, the Memorial Union Building was established, which sits at the centre of the university's main campus. It has since been remodeled, and now hosts a cafeteria; billiards, meeting rooms; student organization offices; and lounges. The college's enrollment significantly increased following World War II, with temporary housing being established due to the influx of veterans. Several programs were added during Dillman's presidency, including engineering administration; physics; and geological engineering. He retired as president of the college in 1956.

== Personal life and death ==
Dillman married Anna Broadwell on December 15, 1914, with whom he had two children, Dorothy and Helen. Anna was the daughter of William and Rosa Broadwell, who were Bangor pioneers engaged in the lumber business. His wife died in 1969 in St. Petersburg, Florida. Dillman died in Flint, Michigan, on April 14, 1979, at the age of 89.

== Legacy and honours ==
The Grover C. Dillman Hall in the Michigan Technological University is named after him, as is the Dr. Grover C. Dillman Memorial Scholarship Fund.

Dillman was awarded the honorary 33rd degree in Masonry for his lifetime of public service. The degree was awarded to him in Philadelphia in September 1950.

=== Honorary degrees ===
- Doctor of Engineering from the Michigan Technological University in Houghton, Michigan
- Master of Highway Engineering from the Michigan State University in East Lansing, Michigan
