= 1981–82 ACHL season =

The 1981–82 Atlantic Coast Hockey League season was the first season of the Atlantic Coast Hockey League, a North American minor professional league. Seven teams participated in the regular season, and the Mohawk Valley Stars were the league champions. The Fitchburg Trappers and Schenectady Chiefs folded during the first month of the season and the Cape Cod Buccaneers, owned by World Wrestling Foundation mogul Vince McMahon, withdrew after 39 games. The four remaining clubs voted to cut short the regular season and move directly to the playoffs. The Salem Raiders had the best record in the league at the time at 32-15. The Raiders lost to the Mohawk Valley Stars of Utica, New York in the championship series.

== Regular season ==
	GP	W	L	T	GF	GA	Pts
Salem Raiders	47	32	15	0	246	161	64
Mohawk Valley Stars	47	28	18	1	225	198	57
Baltimore Skipjacks	48	22	23	3	204	189	47
Cape Cod Buccaneers	39	17	21	1	130	158	35
Winston-Salem Thunderbirds	50	14	33	3	179	265	31
Schenectady Chiefs	9	4	5	0	38	45	8
Fitchburg Trappers	6	2	4	0	26	32	4

== Playoffs ==
Semifinals
2	Mohawk Valley Stars	4
3	Baltimore Skipjacks	3
1	Salem Raiders	4
4	Winston-Salem Thunderbirds	1

Final
2	Mohawk Valley Stars	4
1	Salem Raiders	2
