= Houston Field House =

Multi-purpose arena in Troy, New York, U.S.

Coordinates: 42.7321°N 73.6695°W

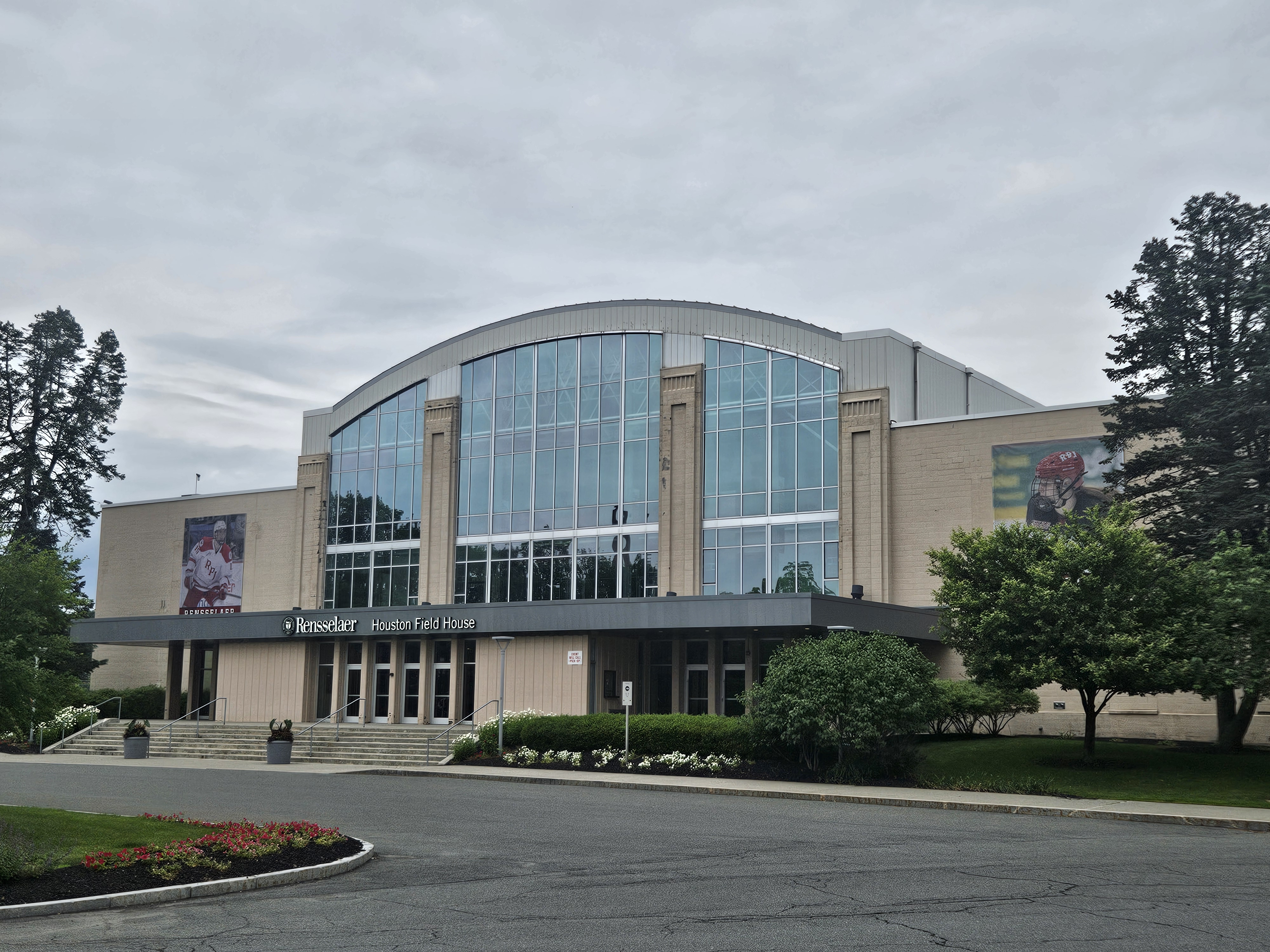
- The arena in 2025
- Interactive map of Houston Field House
- Former names: RPI Field House (1949–1978)
- Location: 1900 Peoples Avenue; Troy, New York
- Owner: Rensselaer Polytechnic Institute
- Operator: RPI Engineers
- Capacity: 4,780 (hockey)
- Surface: 200x85 ft (hockey)

Construction
- Groundbreaking: 1948
- Opened: October 13, 1949; 76 years ago
- Renovated: 1983, 2007
- General contractors: Duncan & Cahill (interior)

Tenants
- RPI Engineers men's hockey (NCAA) (1949–present); New York Rovers (EAHL) (1950–1952); Troy Uncle Sam's Trojans (EAHL) (1952–1953); RPI Engineers women's hockey (NCAA) (1976–present); Troy Slapshots (ACHL) (1986); Capital District Islanders (AHL) (1990–1993); Capital District Selects (EJHL) (1999–2012)

Website
- rpiathletics.com/houstonfieldhouse

Houston Field House is a multi-purpose arena located on the campus of Rensselaer Polytechnic Institute (RPI) in Troy, New York. Opened in 1949 as the RPI Field House, it is the nation's second-oldest college hockey rink still in use, behind Princeton University's Hobey Baker Memorial Rink. The arena was renamed in honor of former RPI president Livingston W. Houston in 1978. Until the opening of Knickerbocker Arena in Albany in 1990, it was the largest arena in the Capital Region.

== Origins ==
Popular legend holds that Houston Field House was previously an airplane or dirigible hangar for the United States armed forces during World War II. In reality, it originated as a warehouse located at the Davisville Naval Construction Battalion Center in Rhode Island. Following the war, the federal government established the Veterans Education Facilities Program (VEFP) to help colleges build facilities to handle the increased enrollment of veterans returning from the war. One aspect of the VEFP was to offer buildings designated as "war surplus" to colleges and academic institutions who applied for them.

Originally, the RPI Board of Trustees, led by then-RPI President Dr. Livingston W. Houston, sought a hangar from the VEFP in order to establish a "sports-civic arena" for the RPI campus and the city of Troy. Unfortunately, hangars were not considered "war surplus." An investigation sponsored by the Board of Trustees discovered the warehouse facility in Rhode Island and applied under the VEFP to bring it to campus, despite the fact that its original design was not satisfactory for the creation of an arena. RPI's application was approved by the Federal Works Agency in February 1947.

The VEFP underwrote both the cost of transporting the warehouse from Davisville to Troy and the cost to reassemble it upon its arrival. RPI, however, spent nearly $500,000 on its own to redesign the warehouse to its own specifications, including the re-fabrication of initial materials and the purchase of new materials. Construction was originally planned to be completed by June 1948; however, inclement weather throughout the project pushed completion back 16 months to October 1949.

== Early history ==
On October 13, 1949, Livingston W. Houston officially opened the building as the RPI Field House as part of a ceremony honoring the Institute's 125th anniversary. The following evening, Canadian Prime Minister Louis St. Laurent was the principal speaker at the convocation and was presented with an honorary degree by Houston; the event marked St. Laurent's first major speech in the United States. A month later, on November 12, 1949, the RPI Field House hosted its first event, an Interfraternity Ball, with music performed by Elliot Lawrence and his 16-piece orchestra. On December 3, 1949, the first sporting event in the Field House's history took place as RPI defeated the New York State Maritime Academy, 55–43, in basketball.

A large impetus for the construction of the Field House was to create a home for the school's ice hockey team, which had played its first games in 1901 at Van Schaick Pond in nearby Cohoes, New York, and later played in various other locations in Cohoes and Albany, New York. From 1912 to 1938 (with the exception of 1937), the team played on an outdoor rink built every winter on campus along Sage Avenue, at the current location of Anderson Field. After the 1938 season, the team went into hiatus. Houston, an RPI alumnus who played hockey for RPI during his school years, originally sought to build the Field House as a means of returning hockey to campus. On January 10, 1950, the "Engineers" under head coach Ned Harkness played their first game at home since 1938, dropping an 8–2 contest to Middlebury. However, and possibly thanks to the construction of the Field House, Harkness would lead the Engineers to an NCAA championship only four years later in 1954.

Two weeks after the first hockey game, the RPI Field House hosted its first commencement ceremony, on January 27, 1950. General Omar Bradley, the Chairman of the Joint Chiefs of Staff, gave the first commencement address.

In January 1950, H. L. (Jack) Garren began working as the new manager of the RPI Field House. Garren came to Troy from Lake Placid, New York, where he had supervised the construction of all facilities for the 1932 Winter Olympics, and continued to manage the venues—including the Olympic Arena—until he left his position in December 1949. Garren's objective was to promote local interest in hockey and figure skating at the RPI Field House; he soon began a offering a program of public skating sessions at the new venue and organized the RPI Figure Skating Club. By mid-January, Thomas F. Lockhart, the business manager for the New York Rangers and president of the Eastern Amateur Hockey League (EAHL), visited Garren and expressed an interest in the possibility of playing New York Rovers games in Troy. Two months later, the Rovers switched three of their home games from Madison Square Garden in New York City to the RPI Field House as an experiment to gauge interest. The Rovers went on to schedule nine of their regular season home contests at the RPI Field House during both the 1950–1951 and 1951–1952 seasons. Although the Rovers were disbanded in August 1952, the team's success in Troy led to the city being granted an expansion franchise in the EAHL that same month. The RPI Field House was the home of the Troy Uncle Sam's Trojans during the 1952–1953 season, but the EAHL did not operate the following season due to a lack of teams.

On December 27, 1951, the Field House hosted the first annual RPI Invitational Tournament. The first tournament featured 8 schools playing 12 games over three days, and was won by Brown University. The following year, the tournament was cut to 4 teams playing a round-robin schedule over 3 days, which remained the tournament's format until 1982, when it gained a 2nd-day consolation game/championship game format. The RPI Invitational was the nation's oldest in-season invitational tournament in college hockey until its final iteration in 2010.

Throughout the 1950s, several RPI sporting events were held at the RPI Field House, including basketball, tennis, wrestling, and pistol and rifle shooting.

In March 1959, the RPI Field House hosted the 1959 NCAA men's ice hockey tournament (known today as the Frozen Four). North Dakota won its first of several NCAA championships, defeating Michigan State in overtime of the championship game. Three of the tournament's four games went into overtime, which also included semifinal and consolation games with Boston College and St. Lawrence. The tournament took place over a three-day period and drew over 17,000 attendees.

Throughout the 1950s and 1960s, the RPI Field House was often referred to as "The Madison Square Garden of Upstate New York". In its first two decades, it played host to more than 300 theatrical and musical events, countless hockey games, and several commencement ceremonies.

== Hockey line ==
As the popularity of hockey grew, tickets became hot items among students. Owing to its origins as a military warehouse, most views were obstructed at least some angle between the rink and the seats due to large support columns that held up the Field House's roof. This led to the birth of what is known simply as "hockey line." Groups of people – usually members of various fraternities and sororities – take a place outside of the RPI Student Union building. Traditionally, the line began sometime during late July or early August prior to the beginning of Fall classes and continued until tickets went on sale in mid-September. People in line are allowed to buy up to eight tickets and can have people hold their place in line while they eat or go to class. Students set up beds, couches, television sets, and, more recently, computers and video games to pass the time as someone occupies each place in line on a 24-hour basis.

Following the Engineers' 1985 national championship victory, the Epsilon Iota chapter of the Psi Upsilon fraternity set a hockey line record by beginning the line on the very next day – March 31, 1985 – and continuing the line through the summer until tickets went on sale on September 25, 1985 — besting the previous record of 33 days with 178 days.

== Renovation and rejuvenation ==
In 1978, a new tradition started that continues today – the annual Big Red Freakout! event. This event fills the Field House with thousands of screaming fans, and there is a giveaway each year.

At the 1978 Commencement ceremonies, it was announced that the RPI Field House would be renamed Houston Field House in honor of former president Livingston W. Houston, who had died the previous winter. Houston had been RPI's 11th president from 1943 to 1958, and was president when the Field House was built.

1983 brought several changes to the Field House. The Institute spent $2.5 million to renovate the building during the summer, including a support renovation which allowed the removal of all but four of the columns. Some think the view obstruction caused by the original columns gave rise to "hockey line" and that column removal led to the demise of "hockey line", but popularity of hockey was at least as large a factor. Indeed, "hockey line" reached its peak several years after the 1983 renovations. New scoreboards were installed, and the ice surface was lengthened to a full NHL size. In 1984, the NCAA tournament returned to Houston Field House for the first time since 1959 as the Engineers took on North Dakota. The Fighting Sioux, coming in as heavy underdogs, upset the homestanding Engineers on consecutive nights, ending the Engineers national title hopes. The next season, the Field House would host its final two NCAA tournament games as RPI dispatched Lake Superior State on their way to their second NCAA championship. Today's NCAA tournament games all take place at neutral ice sites with a minimum capacity higher than that of the Field House.

During the mid-1980s, Houston Field House was part of a vibrant boxing scene in the Capital District. Mike Tyson fought twice at the venue in 1986, including his first nationally televised bout against Jesse Ferguson, but Tyson's rise to the heavyweight championship at the end of the year helped lead to a decline, and boxing has not been featured at Houston Field House in recent years.

The Troy Slapshots of the Atlantic Coast Hockey League began using the Houston Field House as their home arena in October 1986. Established in 1985 as the New York Slapshots, the team was supposed to play in a new arena on Staten Island, but the venue ended up never being built so the Slapshots competed as a traveling team during their first season. After relocating to Troy, the Slapshots only ended up playing six games before the team folded.

The 1987 Big Red Freakout! event featured plastic horns as the giveaway. These horns made Houston Field House reverberate with noise – so much noise, in fact, that the evening's opponent, Brown, filed a complaint with the NCAA. In turn, this led to the creation of what is today known as "the RPI rule" nationwide, which prohibits fans from bringing artificial noisemakers into NCAA events.

In 1990, the Capital District Islanders began play at Houston Field House as the principal minor league affiliate of the New York Islanders; this American Hockey League franchise was established to compete with the International Hockey League's Albany Choppers, which began play the same season at the brand-new, 15,000-seat Knickerbocker Arena, but folded in February 1991. David Hanson served as the team's general manager during its second and third seasons. Hanson had appeared in the movie Slap Shot as one of the three Hanson Brothers; on April 3, 1993, he organized a reunion of the Hanson Brothers before an Islanders game that sold out the Houston Field House and also drew national attention. Later that year, the Capital District Islanders were moved across the river to play at the Knickerbocker Arena as the Albany River Rats and became affiliated with the New Jersey Devils.

The RPI women's hockey team, a club team beginning in 1976, hosted the AWCHA national women's club championship at Houston Field House in 1994, winning the national championship, and in 1995, when they finished in 3rd. The team became a varsity program later that year, and joined their male counterparts in NCAA's Division I in 2005.

During the 1998–1999 hockey season, a new four-sided scoreboard was added to the center of the Field House, replacing the scoreboards on the eastern and western walls.

== Today ==
Today, the Houston Field House seats 4,780 for hockey games, and remains the largest capacity in the ECAC Hockey League despite a decrease from its capacity of 5,217 in 2008. Its modern function is primarily as a home for the RPI men's and women's hockey teams to compete and practice, though several skating clubs also call the Field House home.

Before the opening of the Knickerbocker Arena in Albany, the Houston Field House was the Capital District's main venue for concerts. Recent guests have included The Offspring, Red Hot Chili Peppers, Marilyn Manson, Sting, Bob Dylan, John Mayer, moe., Counting Crows, Matchbox Twenty, Guster & O.A.R., among others.

Since the Field House's opening, the Institute has opened several other venues for athletic teams to play in, and today is used only by the hockey teams among the 21 other varsity sports offered at RPI. This decrease in activity allowed the Institute's intramural hockey program to utilize the Field House. Also, with the increase in enrollment, the Field House now no longer serves as the primary location for Commencement ceremonies. Today, the ceremonies are held at next-door East Campus Stadium. Houston Field House is considered the emergency venue, last holding ceremonies on May 25, 2013 when low temperatures and rain forced the ceremony indoors. Ironically, what may have initially prompted moving commencement out of the Field House was its lack of air conditioning, as the May, 1989 commencement was shortened because of the near-90° heat and stifling temperatures inside the arena.

Today's "hockey line" is a shadow of what it was during its heyday in the 1970s and 1980s. With the number of obstructed view seats now at a minimum, it is no longer necessary to stay on line for weeks to ensure good seats, and the men's hockey team is currently not as successful as it once was. When the Student Union itself was renovated in the late 1990s, the hockey line all but died completely. Today, the Delta Phi fraternity tends to start the line every year in early September, and most other fraternities and many dormatories join the line a day or two before tickets go on sale. When it was a more major local concert venue in the 1970s and 1980s, one would frequently see lines for those tickets as well. In a usual occurrence in 1985, tickets for a joint Night Ranger/Jefferson Starship concert were to go on sale the morning after a Howard Jones concert commenced, so many people attending the concert went on line right after to wait for the ticket booth to open. As Howard Jones left his concert, he noticed the fans waiting outside in the 35° cold and asked what was going on. To show support he offered to sign autographs for everyone on the line.

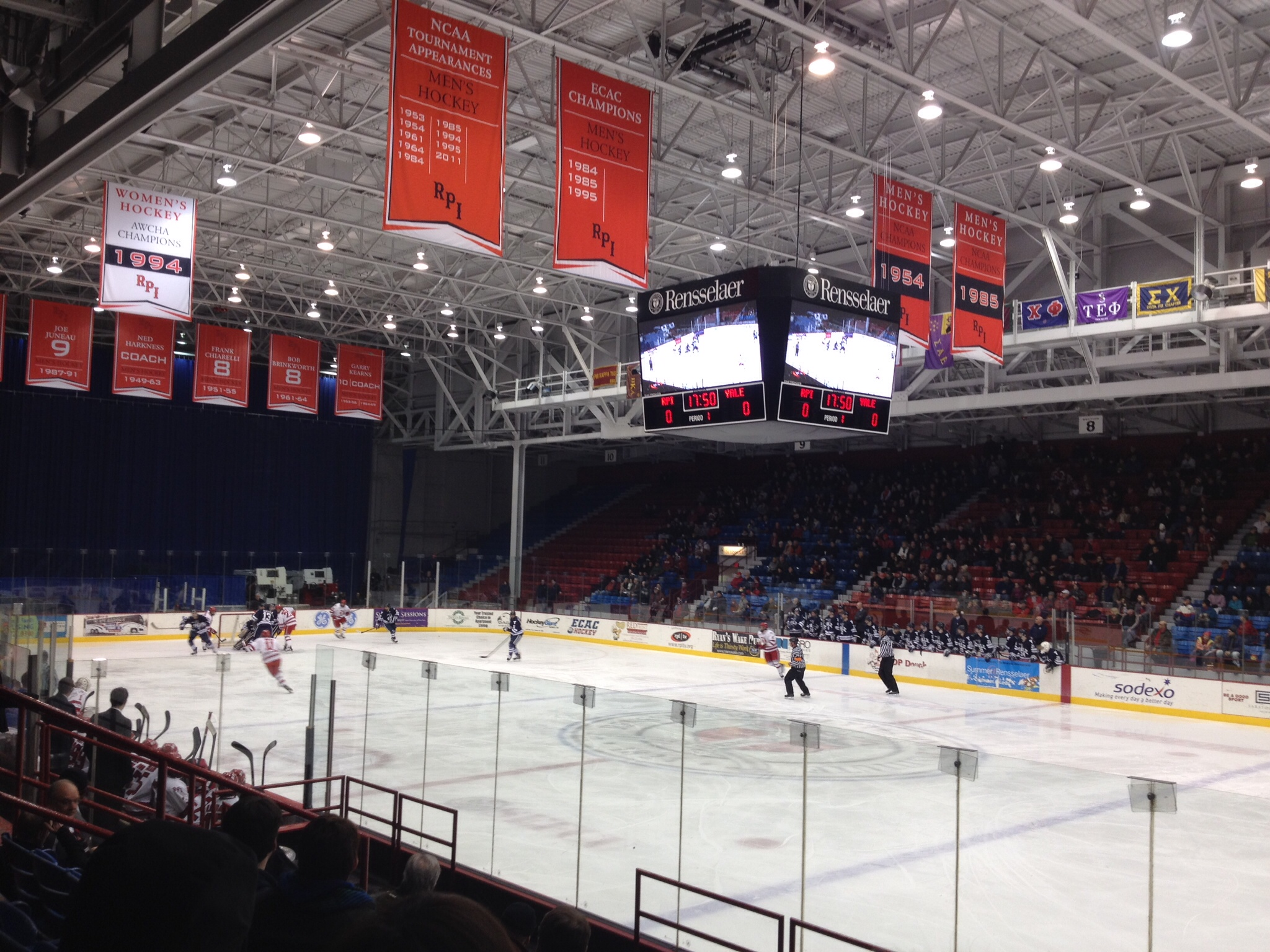
RPI men's ice hockey game at the Houston Field House in 2014

Notable features in the Field House today include the Rensselaer Alumni Association display at the entrance to the arena, which features RPI hockey players who have been named All-Americans and those who have played in the NHL. On the eastern side of the Field House is a stage, upon which "America's Pep Band" plays during hockey games. On the western wall of the Field House, centered by the seal of the Institute, are six banners honoring the men's team's NCAA championships in 1954 and 1985, their ECAC championships in 1984, 1985 and 1995 and a banner honoring the women's club team's AWCHA national championship of 1994.

On November 5, 2004, RPI began its "Ring of Honor" at Houston Field House by unveiling a banner honoring Adam Oates and his number 12. Oates' banner was joined the following year by one recognizing number 9, Joé Juneau. Banners for Ned Harkness, Frank Chiarelli, Bob Brinkworth, Garry Kearns, Jerry Knightley, and John Carter have since been added to the Ring of Honor as well.

As part of a major campus improvement project to build the East Campus Athletic Village, the Houston Field House underwent several renovations starting in 2007. These included the renovations of the locker rooms, addition of a new weight room, and a new special reception room dedicated to Ned Harkness. Additionally, as part of the renovations, a 46kW solar array was installed on the roof.

The indie pop duo Matt & Kim recorded a Harlem Shake video during a concert at the Houston Field House on February 11, 2013.

Following the conclusion of the 2025–2026 hockey season, additional renovations will be made to the Houston Field House to replace the refrigeration system used to make the ice surface and boards that surround the hockey rink.

Preceded by Williams Arena; Minneapolis	Host of the men's Frozen Four; 1959	Succeeded by Boston Arena; Boston
Preceded by first arena	Home of the Capital District Islanders; 1990 – 1993	Succeeded by Knickerbocker Arena (as Albany River Rats)
