= Troy Slapshots =

Former professional minor league ice hockey team in Troy, New York

- City: Troy, New York
- League: Atlantic Coast Hockey League
- Founded: 1986
- Operated: 1986
- Home arena: Houston Field House
- Owner: Rudy Slucker
- General manager: Joe Selenski
- Head coach: Joe Selenski
- Affiliates: Saginaw Generals (IHL)

Franchise history
- 1985–86: New York Slapshots
- 1986: Troy Slapshots

The Troy Slapshots were a professional ice hockey team based in Troy, New York. They were a member of the Atlantic Coast Hockey League (ACHL) in the 1986–87 season, but folded after playing just six games.

== Background ==
The team was established as the New York Slapshots, which were based out of Staten Island, New York. By the time the 1985–86 ACHL season started, the planned Phil Esposito Sports & Entertainment Center in the Travis neighborhood of Staten Island that was to serve as the Slapshots' home rink had not been built, forcing the team to move their 'home' games to Newark, New Jersey. The Slapshots finished playing the season playing their 'home' games in Vinton, Virginia, competing in their inaugural season as a traveling team.

== 1986–87 season ==
Owner Rudy Slucker originally planned to move the Slapshots to the Mennen Sports Arena in Morristown, New Jersey for the 1986–87 season and had even made a deposit to host playoff games at the arena in April 1986, if his team qualified for the playoffs the prior season. However, in May 1986, the team and league announced that the Slapshots would instead be moving upstate and playing their games at the Houston Field House, a 5,367-seat arena located in Troy on the campus of Rensselaer Polytechnic Institute (RPI). The Houston Field House was a familiar site to some, as it was the site of the leaguewide rookie camp in October 1986. The Slapshots had a total of 28 regular season home games scheduled at the Houston Field House as well as an exhibition game against Spartak, a team from the Soviet Championship League that was making a 10-game tour of the United States.

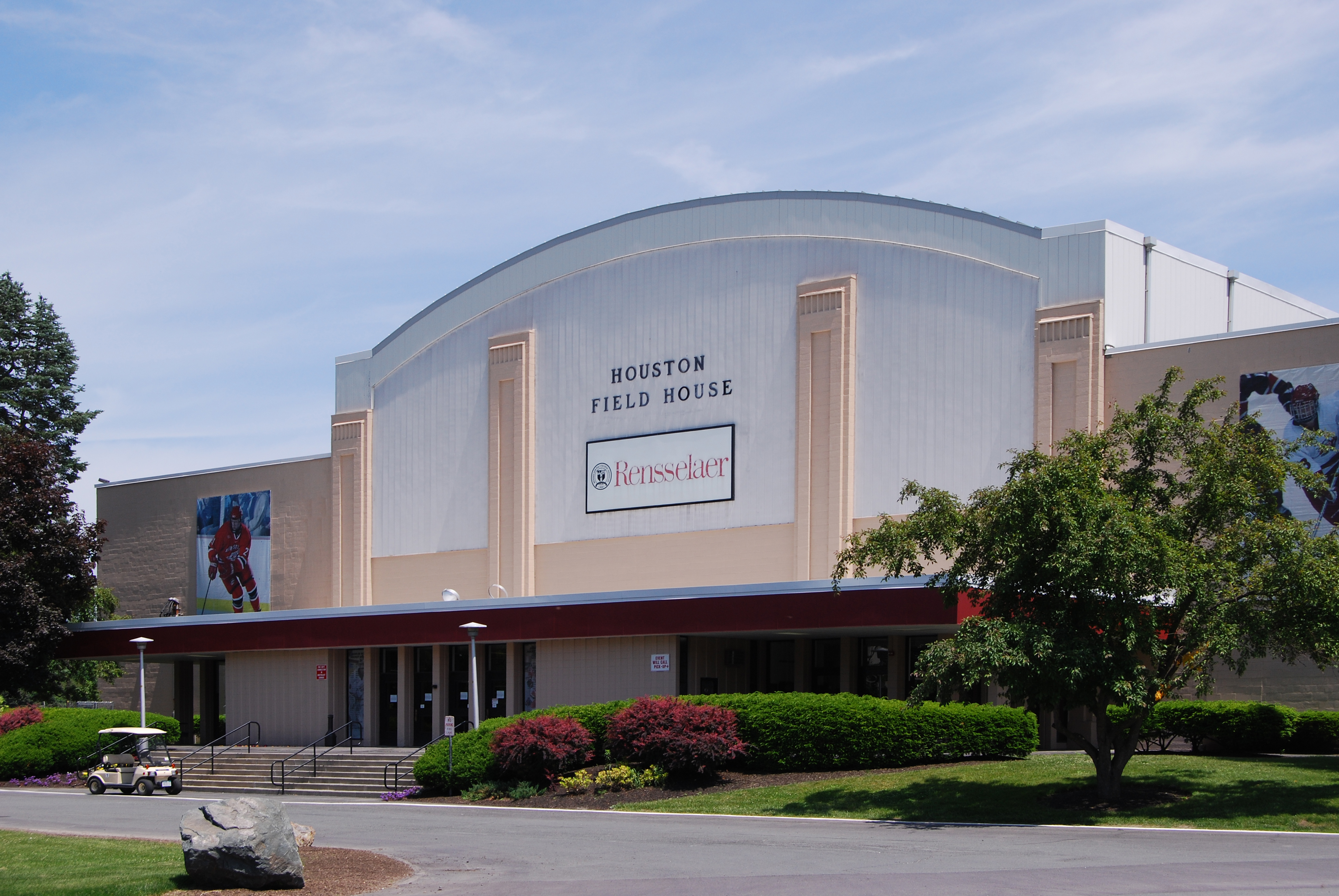
RPI's Houston Field House

The Slapshots opened their season at the Houston Field House on October 25, 1986, in front of a crowd of 1,312 fans. The Slapshots beat the Mohawk Valley Comets 8–5. On hand for opening night pregame ceremonies were: Slucker (who dropped the ceremonial puck); Troy mayor Robert Conway; Troy Chamber of Commerce President John O'Connor; and RPI Engineers coach Mike Addesa. The team's second game was scheduled to be played on the road the following evening against the Virginia Lancers, but the Slapshots' team bus broke down about 100 miles (160 km) into its 12-hour overnight trip to Virginia and the game was postponed.

The Slapshots would only end up playing four home games before folding. At one point in the Slapshots' brief season, they played "in front of an estimated 120 people" and with the exception of opening night, never played in front of more than 300 people. According to general manager-head coach Joe Selenski, players hearing rumors of the franchise moving and seeing a lack of fans in the stands contributed to the team's poor play. To focus his attention on marketing efforts, Selenski handed over most of the coaching responsibilities to assistant coach Scott Talarowski and began watching the games from the stands.

The ACHL planned to take over operation of the team and searched for local investors to save the franchise. Meanwhile, the Slapshots removed all of the team's equipment from its locker room and business office at the Houston Field House, shifting their practice to Troy's Frear Park on November 14, 1986. Although the team had not been evicted, the move was done as a precautionary measure to ensure they could play their next game on the road the following evening. The Slapshots played their last game on November 15, 1986, where they scored a 3–2 shootout victory over the Erie Golden Blades.

=== Removal from league ===
With the nearby Mohawk Valley Comets also struggling, the ACHL Board of Governors held an emergency meeting in Utica on November 17, 1986. The following decisions resulted from the nine-hour meeting:

- Troy Slapshots would be dropped from the league, effective immediately.
- There would not be a dispersal draft for all players on the Slapshots roster.
- The Mohawk Valley Comets would hold the rights to all the players on the Slapshots roster until November 27, 1986.

Shortly after the meeting, the Comets announced that they fired their coach Bill Horton, and replaced him with former Slapshots' coach and general manager Joe Selenski.

Lack of funding and an inexperienced staff ultimately sealed the Slapshots' fate. An initial report to ACHL Commissioner Ray Miron said that the Slapshots had sold anywhere from 750 to 1,000 season tickets prior to the start of the season, when in fact the organization had only sold 66 season tickets. Considered to be an "absentee owner" by Commissioner Miron, Slucker told league president Bill Coffey that he needed corporate sponsorship to continue to run the franchise. The average operating fees being $365,000 for a franchise and possibly more as a startup team, Coffey was only able to come up with $25,000 to help keep the team operating. Miron noted that the $25,000 would not keep the team operational for more than two weeks. Miron summed it up by saying, "We should have known a team with that name would never make it," and then drew a reference to the 1977 film Slap Shot by adding, "If the history of the Slapshots is ever written, it would make a good sequel to the movie of the same name."

The ACHL finished the season with four teams: Mohawk Valley, Erie, Virginia, and the Carolina Thunderbirds. The following season, Mohawk Valley was replaced by the Utica Devils in the American Hockey League, while the Virginia and Carolina teams joined the All-American Hockey League.

== Season-by-season results ==
Season	Games	Won	Lost	Tied	Points	GF	GA
1986–87a	6	2	4	0	4	20	36

a - Franchise dropped from league on November 17, 1986

== See also ==
- Schenectady Chiefs – another ACHL team in the Capital District that folded after nine games
