= Schenectady Chiefs =

- City: Schenectady, New York
- League: Atlantic Coast Hockey League
- Founded: 1981; 45 years ago
- Operated: 1981; 45 years ago
- Home arena: Schenectady Civic Center
- Owner: Bob Critelli
- General manager: Pete Crawford
- Head coach: Pete Crawford

Franchise history
- 1981–82: Schenectady Chiefs

The Schenectady Chiefs were a professional ice hockey team in Schenectady, New York. They were a member of the Atlantic Coast Hockey League in the 1981–82 season.

They played their home games in the Center City Ice Rink. Center City was unique in the sense that the arena was situated in an indoor open area of a sparsely used office building, had no PA system and had bleachers on only one side of the ice.

== Prior History ==
The Chiefs were initially a member of the newly organized Intercontinental Major Hockey League (IMHL), a league founded by Lou Bodnar, a local mutual funds broker, and Bob Critelli, a local businessman. The IMHL was to consist of five teams, but with the unnamed Pittsfield team unready to field a team, this forced Bodnar and Critelli to suspend operations of the league.

== ACHL ==
The Chiefs were admitted into the newly created seven team Atlantic Coast Hockey League in September 1981. With the IMHL now indefinitely suspended, Critelli focused being the owner of the Chiefs and hired Pete Crawford as the team's coach and general manager. The Chiefs would play the first game in ACHL history, defeating the Cape Cod Buccaneers 5-2 on October 24, 1981 in front of a small crowd of 650 fans. The team was relatively successful on the ice, going 4–4 in their first eight games. However, Critelli had financial problems with the team. He could not produce the $15,000 performance bond, which was required by the league prior to the start of the season. The team suspended play and the league subsidized the Chiefs, primarily to help Critelli sell the team.

After an 8–2 loss against the Salem Raiders in front of 350 fans, officials decided to suspend the franchise again on November 11, 1981. The league attempted to move the franchise to Richmond without success. After no local buyers were willing to take over the team, the league held a meeting on November 15, 1981 in which they voted to terminate the Chiefs effective on the 16th. With six of their nine games being played at the Schenectady Civic Center, the Chiefs averaged less than 400 fans a game.

== Season-by-season results ==
Season	Games	Won	Lost	Tied	Points	GF	GA
1981-82a	9	4	5	0	8	38	45

a - Franchise terminated by league, 11-16-81

== See also ==
- Troy Slapshots – another ACHL team in the Capital District that folded after six games
