= Rob Laird (ice hockey) =

Canadian ice hockey player

- Born: December 29, 1954 (age 71) Regina, Saskatchewan, Canada
- Height: 5 ft 9 in (175 cm)
- Weight: 180 lb (82 kg; 12 st 12 lb)
- Position: Left wing
- Shot: Left
- Played for: Minnesota North Stars
- NHL draft: 116th overall, 1974; Pittsburgh Penguins
- WHA draft: 29th overall, 1974; Minnesota Fighting Saints
- Playing career: 1974–1986

Glenn Roberts "Rob" Laird (born December 29, 1954) is a Canadian retired professional ice hockey left winger who played in one National Hockey League (NHL) game for the Minnesota North Stars during the 1979–80 NHL season.

== Early life ==
Laird was born in Regina, Saskatchewan. He played junior hockey with the Regina Pats from 1971 to 1974.

== Career ==
Laird was drafted 116th overall in the 1974 NHL Amateur Draft by the Pittsburgh Penguins and 29th overall in the 1974 WHA Amateur Draft by the Minnesota Fighting Saints.

He played eight seasons with the Fort Wayne Komets and on March 6, 2002, he was inducted into the Komet Hall of Fame, in which he was honored with his jersey number #18 retired.

He also coached the AHL's Baltimore Skipjacks and Moncton Hawks as well as the IHL's Fort Wayne Komets and Phoenix Roadrunners. He served as an assistant coach for the Washington Capitals in the 1989–90 season.

Laird is a senior pro scout for the Los Angeles Kings, having joined the club in the 1997–98 season.

== Career statistics ==
			Regular season					Playoffs
Season	Team	League	GP	G	A	Pts	PIM	GP	G	A	Pts	PIM
1971–72	Regina Pats	WCHL	1	1	0	1	0	—	—	—	—	—
1972–73	Regina Pats	WCHL	68	14	18	32	102	4	0	0	0	0
1973–74	Regina Pats	WCHL	68	39	45	84	243	16	11	15	26	69
1974–75	Fort Wayne Komets	IHL	62	15	28	43	115	—	—	—	—	—
1975–76	Fort Wayne Komets	IHL	78	30	38	68	127	9	8	4	12	15
1976–77	Fort Wayne Komets	IHL	78	43	46	89	151	9	3	3	6	10
1977–78	Fort Wayne Komets	IHL	64	20	22	42	202	11	3	6	9	46
1978–79	Fort Wayne Komets	IHL	80	45	62	107	296	13	7	10	17	80
1979–80	Oklahoma City Stars	CHL	61	26	19	45	160	—	—	—	—	—
1979–80	Minnesota North Stars	NHL	1	0	0	0	0	—	—	—	—	—
1980–81	Oklahoma City Stars	CHL	55	24	23	47	137	3	1	1	2	8
1981–82	Nashville South Stars	CHL	35	5	13	18	55	3	0	1	1	15
1983–84	Fort Wayne Komets	IHL	77	37	46	83	137	4	0	1	1	17
1984–85	Fort Wayne Komets	IHL	79	33	34	67	157	13	7	5	12	25
1985–86	Fort Wayne Komets	IHL	2	0	0	0	15	—	—	—	—	—
IHL totals			520	223	276	499	1200	59	28	29	57	193
NHL totals			1	0	0	0	0	—	—	—	—	—

== Awards and honours ==
Award	Year
IHL
First All-Star Team	1979

== See also ==
- List of players who played only one game in the NHL
