= Livingston W. Houston =

American academic administrator (1891–1977)

11th President of Rensselaer Polytechnic Institute
- In office October 3, 1944 – March 1, 1958
- Preceded by: William O. Hotchkiss
- Succeeded by: Richard G. Folsom

Personal details
- Born: January 18, 1891 Wyoming, Ohio, U.S.
- Died: November 22, 1977 (aged 86) Troy, New York, U.S.
- Spouse: Margery Caldwell (m. 1916; died 1959)
- Children: 3

Livingston Waddell Houston (January 18, 1891 – November 22, 1977) was the eleventh president of Rensselaer Polytechnic Institute.

== Biography ==
He was born on January 18, 1891, in Wyoming, Ohio. He graduated from Rensselaer in 1913 with a degree in mechanical engineering and was a member of the engineering honor society Tau Beta Pi His first job out of school was as an assistant engineer for the Mobil Gas Company. In 1919, he joined the Ludlow Valve Company of Troy, a large manufacturer of fire hydrants, as production manager. By 1932, he rose to president of the company and he remained president until 1941, when he became chairman of the board. He was chairman of the board until 1960.

In 1925, he was elected a Life Trustee of Rensselaer. In 1944, he was elected president of Rensselaer. The post-war years were ones of great growth with the increased enrollment due to the return of those serving in World War II. In 1946, surplus military barracks were obtained to house them. These buildings were formally called the Rendael dormitories, but informally known as "Tin Town." By 1953, these buildings were replaced by a complex of four dormitories and a dining hall, which formed what is still the heart of "Freshman Hill." In 1948–1949, the institute obtained a surplus navy warehouse from the government that was remodeled to become the R.P.I. Field House, used for events and sports competitions, especially ice hockey games. In 1955, Rensselaer and United Aircraft Corp. built a branch campus in Hartford, Connecticut, called the Hartford Graduate Center. During his tenure, enrollment went from 1,200 to 4,000 students, the number of faculty tripled and the assets rose from $17 million to more than $50 million. He died at Samaritan Hospital in Troy, New York on November 22, 1977. After his death, the R.P.I. Field House was renamed the Houston Field House in his honor.
