= Theta Xi =

American college social fraternity

- ΘΞ
- Founded: April 29, 1864; 162 years ago Rensselaer Polytechnic Institute
- Type: Social
- Affiliation: NIC
- Status: Active
- Scope: National
- Motto: Juncti Juvant "United they Serve"
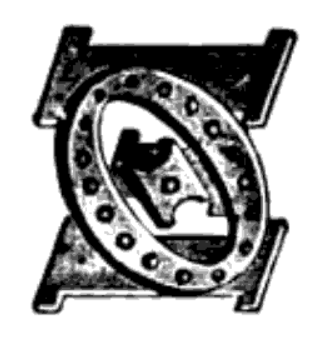
- Member badge
- Colors: Azure Blue and Silver
- Symbol: Unicorn
- Flag
- Flower: Blue Iris
- Mascot: Unicorn
- Patron saint: Benjamin Franklin
- Publication: The Unicorn
- Philanthropy: Habitat for Humanity International & National Multiple Sclerosis Society
- Chapters: 44 Active 2 Colonies
- Headquarters: Suite 900; 260 Peachtree Street NW; Atlanta, Georgia 30303; United States
- Website: www.thetaxi.org

Theta Xi (ΘΞ) is a North American Greek-letter social college fraternity. It was founded at Rensselaer Polytechnic Institute in 1864. Of all the social fraternities today, Theta Xi was the only one founded during the Civil War. Its Grand Lodge is headquartered in downtown Atlanta. Since its inception, Theta Xi has grown to include more than 60,000 initiated members. Currently, there are approximately 45 active chapters and one colony. The Theta Xi Fraternity Chapter House at Rensselaer Polytechnic Institute is listed on the National Register of Historic Places.

== History ==
Theta Xi was founded on April 29, 1864 at Rensselaer Polytechnic Institute in Troy, New York as an engineering fraternity. Its founders were George Bradford Brainerd, Samuel Buel Jr., Henry Harrison Farnum, Peter Henry Fox, Ralph Gooding Packard, Thomas Cole Raymond, Nathaniel Henry Starbuck, and Christopher Champlin Waite.

All of the original founders were members of a local fraternity called Sigma Delta, established in 1859 to rival Theta Delta Chi, which was then a secret society at RPI. Debates were common and encouraged at Sigma Delta meetings; however, on the evening of October 30, 1863, George Brainerd tendered his resignation to the society. This resignation was unanimously declined, but ultimately created a rift. Soon after, talks began circulating of affiliating with a larger organization such as Sigma Phi. However, when Sigma Phi declined to issue a charter, this only increased tensions.

On March 12, 1864, voting took place for members of a new organization, and on April 1, a committee consisting of Waite, Buel, Brainerd, and Packard began preparing a new constitution. By April 6, Buel presented monograms for two new names, Theta Xi and Theta Psi. Theta Xi was chosen to avoid confusion regarding a local fraternity called Theta Psi at Yale.

Within its first forty years, six chapters were established at Yale, Stevens Institute of Technology, MIT, Columbia University, Cornell University, and Lehigh University. It was not until 1905 that a westward expansion occurred with chapters at Purdue and, a month later, Washington University in St. Louis. The first west coast chapter came in 1910 at UC Berkeley, and in April 1921, the first southern chapter was founded at LSU.

In 1962, talks began of folding Kappa Sigma Kappa, a smaller, struggling fraternity into Theta Xi. The merger was completed on August 20, 1962. As a direct result, several of Theta Xi's traditions were altered. The coat-of-arms' fleur-de-lis was changed to have crescent moons in tradition with Kappa Sigma Kappa and the “pledge” pins were also changed to incorporate Kappa Sigma Kappa's traditions diagonal white band. The fraternity flower was changed from the white carnation to the blue iris. Finally, the membership manual was changed from The Theta Xi Pledge Manual to The Quest for Theta Xi. In 1964, as a commemoration for the fraternity's centennial, a new Memorial Headquarters was formally dedicated in St. Louis. This served as the official home of the Grand Lodge until 2001.

In 1974, the Beta Alpha chapter at Georgia Tech became a Christian chapter while remaining a full member of Theta Xi and the Georgia Tech IFC. The chapter remains Christian today and is the only Christian chapter of a secular national fraternity in the United States. Their model expanded to the Gamma Phi chapter at Georgia Southern University in 2008, however that chapter has since reverted to the traditional non-religious status.

Beginning in 1999, Theta Xi began offering Leadership academies to its active brothers. That year, the first President's Academy was held to train new chapter presidents, funded by the Theta Xi Foundation. In 2006, this was expanded to include Rising Stars Academy, which aims to make first-year initiates more active in the fraternity.

The Theta Xi Fraternity Chapter House at Rensselaer Polytechnic Institute was listed on the National Register of Historic Places in 2013.

In 2014, Theta Xi celebrated its sesquicentennial. In honor of this occasion, the National Convention was held in Troy, New York to commemorate the founding of Theta Xi.

William S. Mason, considered to be one of the greatest benefactors and supporters of Theta Xi, was the main supporter of the fraternity's adoption of Benjamin Franklin as its patron saint.

Although the fraternity had been headquartered in St. Louis since 1924, on October 3, 2022, it opened new headquarters at 260 Peachtree Street in Atlanta with the address for the Theta Xi Foundation remaining in St. Louis.

== Purpose ==
The Purpose of Theta Xi is to provide a college home environment for its active members in which fellowship and alumni guidance lead to wholesome mental, moral, physical, and spiritual growth. To that end Theta Xi actively supports and augments college and community efforts to make individual members more mature and chapter groups more useful units of society. Through its alumni and undergraduate leadership Theta Xi endeavors to assist each member to develop: ONE, intellectual curiosity that assures the highest scholarship rating consistent with his ability; TWO, habits that lead to better mental and physical health; THREE, sincerity in his association with others and confidence in himself; FOUR, responsibility to chapter, college, community, and country; FIVE, leadership that comes from practicing the principles of democratic self-government; SIX, interests and activities outside regular scholastic studies that employ spare time to advantage; SEVEN, spiritual understanding that provides a reservoir of strength to draw upon when faced with conditions beyond comprehension.

== Symbols ==
Theta Xi's motto is Juncti Juvant or "United they Serve". The fraternity's badge is a monogram of the Greek letters ΘΞ, with twenty pearls and either a diamond or ruby in the bar. Its pledge pin is a white enamel circle with a blue shield.

The fraternity's colors are azure blue and silver. Its flower is the blue iris. Its patron saint is Benjamin Franklin. Theta XI's publication is The Unicorn, named for the fraternity's mascot.

== Philanthropy ==
At the 111th Anniversary Convention held on August 12, 1974 Theta Xi announced its adoption of the fight against Multiple Sclerosis as its National Service Project. At the 129th Anniversary Convention held on August 4–6, 1993 the fraternity announced its second alternate NSP as Habitat for Humanity.

These charities are a mainstay among all chapters of the fraternity, as well as the numerous other charities supported by individual chapters. On June 20, 1986 Theta Xi was named the Outstanding Volunteer Organization for 1985-86 by the National Multiple Sclerosis Society. Theta Xi takes exceptional pride in its members' involvement in these and other charities.

The Theta Xi Foundation was founded in 1949 in order to promote the education and growth of members of the fraternity. It is set up to aid in developing the members into responsible citizens that will contribute to the well-being of society. Contributions that mostly come from alumni and friends provide the money for the Foundation. The Foundation consists of two Funds, the Chapter Education Fund and the Unicorn Fund. The funds raised are used to sponsor several programs such as President's Academy, Rising Stars Academy, and the District Leadership Academies.

== See also ==
- List of social fraternities
