= Erie County Field House =

Multipurpose arena in Erie, Pennsylvania

Coordinates: 42.09706°N 80.01122°W

The Erie County Field House was a multipurpose arena in Erie, Pennsylvania, United States. It was home to the Erie Blades, a North American Hockey League and American Hockey League franchise. According to a 1976 promotional flyer for the facility, (Note: "9 Years Of Rock", p. 51) it had 3,750 permanent seats with a maximum capacity of 5,250. The arena was eventually replaced by the Louis J. Tullio Arena in 1983.

== Major events ==
In 1980 the Erie Blades played the Russian Olympic team in an exhibition game at the fieldhouse. The Blades lost 9–0.

It was also home to many great concerts of the day, including Alice Cooper, Air Supply, Rush, Heart, Kansas, AC/DC, Aerosmith, Van Halen, Sammy Hagar, Black Sabbath, Nazareth, Molly Hatchet, Journey, Kiss, Ted Nugent, Judas Priest, Blue Öyster Cult, Foghat, Barry Manilow, Bay City Rollers, The Carpenters, Cheap Trick, Peter Frampton, Tom Jones, Johnny Cash, and Santana.

Other events such as boat shows, circuses, the world famous lipizzaner stallions, and Ice Capades occurred there.

The Mace Electronics Spectacular was also held there for several years.

Lou Bizzaro fought Roberto Durán there for the lightweight title in a televised fight.

It was the venue where "Studio Wrestling" was taped in the mid-1970s.

== Post-closure ==
After closing in 1983, the facility served as an operations plant and warehouse for the Menasha (cardboard) Box Corporation.

In 2011 the facility was purchased by an Erie company and is being used for warehouse space. Part of the building is also being used by Mercyhurst College's maintenance dept.

Paul Gamsby, University of Michigan hockey hall of fame member, was manager of the Field House for many years.
