= Theta Xi Fraternity Chapter House =

- U.S. National Register of Historic Places
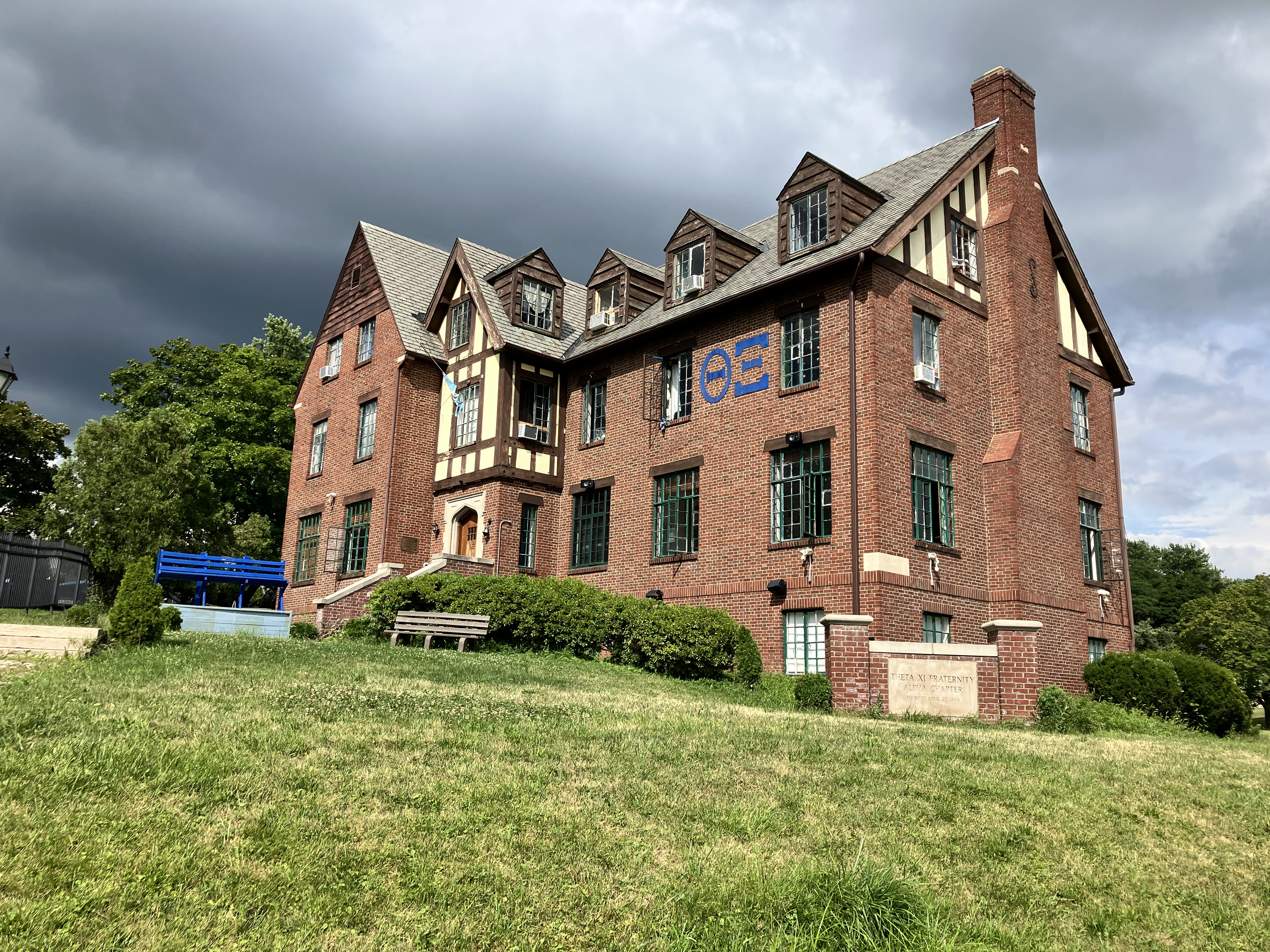
- Photograph of the Theta Xi Fraternity Chapter House in July 2024

- Location within New York Location within the United States
- Location: 1490 Sage Ave., Troy, New York
- Coordinates: 42°43′50″N 73°40′31″W
- Area: 0.65 acres (0.26 ha)
- Built: 1931
- Built by: Rosch Brothers
- Architect: Lawlor, Joseph M.
- Architectural style: Tudor Revival
- NRHP reference No.: 13000911
- Added to NRHP: December 11, 2013

Theta Xi Fraternity Chapter House, also known as the Alpha of Theta Xi Fraternity Chapter House, or less formally as The Zoo, is a historic fraternity house associated with Rensselaer Polytechnic Institute and located at 1490 Sage Avenue in Troy, Rensselaer County, New York. It was built in 1931 as a chapter house for Theta Xi fraternity. It was listed on the National Register of Historic Places in 2013.

== History ==
The first recorded attempts of the fraternity to secure land owned by the university occurred in 1910, through letters sent to the then school president and brother Palmer C. Ricketts. However, due to the schools long-term plans to expand creating more dormitories along with a graduate program the only one plot of land was available at the time. This land was described as a "hillside nobody would think to build on," and "practically useless", by the then president and would later become the E-Complex dormitory. That year, a different plot of land was purchased from the university for $25,000 in the area where the Sage Dining Hall and RPI Playhouse currently reside. A proposal for the construction was created by brothers in 1913 for this plot of land, but was never acted upon due to a lack of funding.

In 1921, the alumni of the chapter reorganized to reopen the discussion of building a permanent establishment for the chapter. Following one more acquisition and selling of a property on 15th Street in 1926, the final plot on 1490 Sage Avenue was purchased. Redesigns for this new property were proposed at that time by architects Joseph M. Lawlor, but due to the Great Depression were not able to be acted upon until 1931. An offer for the construction of the house for $50,000, gracious for the time, was agreed upon, split half between money owned by the chapter and loans taken out from a local bank.

On June 13, 1931, the construction commenced with brother Ricketts placing the first stone. A crowd of around 100 was present including many alumni responsible for the organization and ultimate completion of the chapter house. By its eventual completion in September of the same year, the building had taken more than 20 years of effort and upwards of $57,000 for its completion.

In 2014, to celebrate the 150th anniversary of its founding, the Theta Xi Association of Troy, NY, started a large capital campaign to upgrade the chapter house's infrastructure and appeal to modern standards.

== Architecture ==
The Theta Xi Fraternity Chapter House is in the Tudor Revival style. It was designed by Joseph M. Lawor of Lawlor and Haase. It is a 2 1/2-story, irregular "T" plan, hollow tile building with a Flemish bond brick veneer. It sits on a poured concrete foundation and has a steeply pitched slate gable roof that has intersecting gables. The building features an entry pavilion, half-timbering and stucco file on the second story, grouped metal casement windows, tall chimneys, and a Tudor arch limestone entryway.

Inside, the house has a living room and dining room with decorative limestone fireplaces and cased oak beams. It also has numerous small bedrooms, and an industrial kitchen.

The house was listed on the National Register of Historic Places (NRHP No. 13000911) on December 11, 2013.

== See also ==
- North American fraternity and sorority housing
