= Baltimore Skipjacks =

Former minor league hockey team in Baltimore, Maryland (1981–1993)

- City: Baltimore, Maryland
- League: EHL (1979–1981); ACHL (1981–1982); AHL (1982–1993)
- Operated: 1979–1993
- Home arena: Baltimore Civic Center (renamed Baltimore Arena in 1986)
- Affiliates: Minnesota North Stars (1979–1981); Boston Bruins (1982–1983); Pittsburgh Penguins (1982–1987); Washington Capitals (1988–1993)

Franchise history
- 1979–1981: Baltimore Clippers
- 1981–1982: Baltimore Skipjacks (ACHL)
- merged with: Erie Blades in 1982
- 1982–1993: Baltimore Skipjacks
- 1993–2016: Portland Pirates
- 2016–present: Springfield Thunderbirds

Championships
- Regular season titles: 1: (1983–84)
- Division titles: 1: (1983–84)

The Baltimore Skipjacks were a minor league professional ice hockey team from Baltimore, Maryland, United States. The Skipjacks originated in 1979, and played as the Baltimore Clippers in the Eastern Hockey League for two seasons. The team was renamed to Skipjacks in 1981, and played the following season in the Atlantic Coast Hockey League. The Skipjacks then played eleven seasons as members of the American Hockey League (AHL), from 1982 until 1993. In 1993, the Skipjacks relocated to Portland, Maine, becoming the Portland Pirates.

The Skipjacks were one of three AHL teams to have been based in Baltimore, including the Baltimore Clippers, and the Baltimore Bandits. The Skipjacks operated as a farm team to the Pittsburgh Penguins and Washington Capitals for five seasons each, and were previously a farm team to the Minnesota North Stars for two seasons, the Boston Bruins for one season. The team played its home games at the Baltimore Civic Center, which was renamed to the Baltimore Arena in 1986.

Gene Ubriaco was the team's head coach for seven seasons, and won the AHL Coach of the Year Award during the 1983–84 AHL season, when he led the Skipjacks to a division title. The Skipjacks reached the Calder Cup finals in the 1984–85 AHL season, but were defeated by the Sherbrooke Canadiens. In the same season, Jon Casey won the AHL Goaltender of the Year Award and led the AHL in goals against average. Mitch Lamoureux is the team's career leader in goals (119), assists (133), and points (252), and was inducted into the AHL Hall of Fame.

== Eastern Hockey League ==
Baltimore Clippers logo used for two seasons from 1979 to 1981

When the Southern Hockey League folded due to financial issues in 1977, Baltimore no longer had a professional hockey team. A group of businessmen formed the Baltimore Hockey Advocates in 1979, and raised US$100,000 to purchase an expansion team for Baltimore. The Eastern Hockey League (EHL) granted the Advocates an expansion team on September 12, 1979, which revived the Baltimore Clippers name. The Clippers name paid homage to local history in the Baltimore Clipper, and the Port of Baltimore.

The Clippers played in the EHL for two seasons, and were affiliated as a farm team of the Minnesota North Stars of the National Hockey League from 1979 to 1981. The team played in green, white and gold uniform colors, the same as its parent team in Minnesota. Their first games was a 4–1 loss to the Erie Blades on October 24, 1979.

Gene Ubriaco was the team's first head coach. He had played left wing for a Baltimore team during the 1967–68 AHL season, and retired as a player in 1970. During the 1979–80 season, he briefly came out of retirement and played four minutes as an emergency goaltender, stopping all three shots he faced.

The Clippers won 41 games in the team's first season, tied for a second-place finish and five wins behind the first-place team. Warren Young was the team's highest-scoring center, and led the league with 53 goals scored. In the 1980 Mitchell Cup playoffs, the Clippers reached the final round versus the defending champion Erie Blades, losing the series four games to one.

In the 1980–81 season, the Clippers dropped to fourth place, winning 29 games. Defenseman Gerry Ciarcia, tied for the league lead with 68 assists. In the 1981 playoffs, the Clippers faced the first place Erie Blades and lost all four games in the series. In June 1981, the North Stars named Ubriaco coach and general manager of the Nashville South Stars in the Central Hockey League. On July 19, 1981, team owners mutually agreed to fold the EHL, and begin a new league.

== Atlantic Coast Hockey League ==
Inaugural Baltimore Skipjacks logo used in the 1981–82 season

The Atlantic Coast Hockey League (ACHL) was founded in 1981 to replace the EHL. The Advocates raised another US$100,000 to help establish the new league. Advocates' president John Haas stated the ACHL was set up "primarily to pay the financial obligations" of the EHL. The team was rebranded as the Baltimore Skipjacks, to avoid paying US$10,000 in trademark rights for the Clippers' name. The team name had maritime origins in the skipjack boat, which later became one of the state symbols of Maryland in 1985.

The Skipjacks did not affiliate as an NHL farm team during the season, and chose a green and white color scheme without the gold color used by the North Stars. The new logo resembled a ship's wheel, with the team name spelled out with ropes. Moose Lallo became the new head coach, agreeing to a one-year contract. He had won two championships during twenty years of coaching in the International Hockey League.

The new Skipjacks' first game was a 6–4 victory versus the Salem Raiders on October 24, 1981. Baltimore finished third place in the 1981–82 ACHL season. Jim Stewart was named an ACHL first team all-star, as the league's best goaltender. In the 1982 playoffs, Baltimore faced the second place Mohawk Valley Stars. In a high-scoring series with 72 goals, the Stars prevailed in seven games.

== American Hockey League ==
=== Penguins' affiliate ===
Baltimore Skipjacks logo used during the 1982–83 season, in similar colors to the Penguins and Bruins.

Skipjacks team owners lobbied for an American Hockey League team in Baltimore. In 1982, the Pittsburgh Penguins relocated their farm team by merging players from the Erie Blades into the ACHL's Skipjacks, and signing a three-year affiliation commitment. Coach Lou Angotti and sixteen Erie players made the move to Baltimore. The Skipjacks also had a secondary affiliation with the Boston Bruins for the 1982–83 AHL season. Baltimore changed its uniform colors to black, gold and white, similar to both the Penguis and Bruins, and used a new logo. For the 1982–83 season, salaries of fifteen players were paid by the Penguins, four players where paid by the Bruins, while two player additional players were signed by the Skipjacks.

Mike Gillis led the team in scoring with 113 points. Mitch Lamoureux led the league with 57 goals, and won the Dudley "Red" Garrett Memorial Award as the AHL Rookie of the Year. Defenseman Greg Tebbutt won the Eddie Shore Award as the AHL Defenseman of the Year. Lamoureux improved the offense, but the Skipjacks finished the season in fifth place and missed the playoffs.

The Skipjacks went into the 1983–84 AHL season affiliated only with Pittsburgh. The Skipjacks unveiled a new logo for the season which resembled the word "JACKS" superimposed on a ship's wheel, and used the same black, gold and white color scheme of the Penguins. Ubriaco was brought back as head coach, and led the team to its best record with 102 points, and 384 goals scored. The Skipjacks won the John D. Chick Trophy as the regular season champions of the AHL's south division. The offense was evenly spread out with 18 different players scoring at least 10 goals, and Paul Gardner led the team with 81 points. The Skipjacks were bolstered by the conscious decision of the Penguins to keep its prospects in the AHL, in an effort to finish last in the 1983–84 NHL season and win the right to select Mario Lemieux first overall in the 1984 NHL entry draft. In the playoffs, the Skipjacks defeated the fourth place Springfield Indians in four straight games, then waited 15 days for the second round start as Rochester Americans and St. Catharines Saints series went the full seven games. The layoff possibly affected the Skipjacks, as they lost to Rochester in six games in the second round. After the season, Ubriaco was given the Louis A. R. Pieri Memorial Award as the AHL's Coach of the Year.

In the 1984–85 AHL season, the Skipjacks set a professional ice hockey and a league record with 16 consecutive wins during February and March. The Skipjacks featured seven different players with 20-goal seasons, and finished second place in the south division with 98 points. The defense was led by captain Steve Carlson, and goaltender Jon Casey, on loan from the Minnesota North Stars. Casey led the league with the lowest goals against average to win the Harry "Hap" Holmes Memorial Award, and was voted the AHL's best goaltender, winning the Aldege "Baz" Bastien Memorial Award. In the playoffs, the Skipjacks defeated Rochester in the first round by four games to one, and then won all four games against the first place Binghamton Whalers in the second round. The Skipjacks' offense was shut down in the finals by rookie 19-year-old goaltender Patrick Roy, and the team lost in six games to the Sherbrooke Canadiens.

The Skipjacks struggled in the 1985–86 AHL season, even though Ubriaco stayed when many players moved up to the NHL. The offense was led by Tom Roulston with 38 goals, and 87 points. The team finished seventh place in the southern division, missing the playoffs. In the 1986–87 AHL season, Ubriaco improved the team to fifth place in the southern division, but still missed the playoffs. Alain Lemieux led the team with 41 goals and 97 points, and placed second overall in league scoring. The Penguins did not renew the affiliation agreement after the season.

=== Unaffiliated season ===
Baltimore needed to find a new source of money, without the financial help from the Penguins. Businessman Tom Ebright purchased the team for $250,000, and operated it as an independent franchise, without an NHL farm team affiliation for the 1987–88 AHL season. Baltimore's roster relied on players from several teams. The Skipjacks began the season with eighteen consecutive losses, breaking a professional hockey record previously held by the Washington Capitals who lost 17 straight in the 1974–75 NHL season. The Skipjacks finished last in the AHL with 35 points, missing the playoffs. The team's leading player was center Doug Shedden, who scored 37 goals, and 88 points on the season.

=== Capitals' affiliate ===
Skipjacks logo from 1988 to 1993 in Washington Capitals colors.

The Washington Capitals began a five-year farm team affiliation with the Skipjacks in the 1988–89 AHL season. The Skipjacks logo was switched to a red, white and blue color scheme to match the Washington Capitals. Terry Murray was appointed the new head coach, and improved the team record to 30 wins, but the Skipjacks missed the playoffs for a fourth consecutive season. Centerman Mike Richard led the team in scoring with 44 goals, and 107 points, placing fourth overall in the league. Mike Millar scored 47 goals, and Scott McCrory added 37 goals.

The Skipjacks began the 1989–90 AHL season with a 26–17–2 record, before head coach Terry Murray was promoted to the NHL, and replaced by Doug MacLean. The Skipjacks finished the season with 43 wins, and a third-place finish in the southern division. Goaltender Jim Hrivnak won 24 games, and earned four shutouts, and Mike Richard led the team in scoring again with 41 goals, and 83 points. In the playoffs, the Skipjacks defeated the second place Adirondack Red Wings in six games, in the first round, then lost to the first place Rochester Americans in six games in the second round.

In the 1990–91 AHL season, Rob Laird became the team's new head coach. Kenny Albert began his professional broadcasting career as the play-by-play announcer of the Skipjacks in 1990. The offense was led by Alfie Turcotte with 33 goals, and 85 points, and Jim Hrvniak won 20 games in goal. The Skipjacks finished third place in the regular season, received a bye in the first round, then faced the Binghamton Rangers in round two of the playoffs, losing in six games.

The league realigned into three divisions for the 1991–92 AHL season, with the Skipjacks remaining in the southern division. Washington also allocated the Hampton Roads Admirals of the East Coast Hockey League, as a farm team for the Skipjacks. The offense was led by Simon Wheeldon with 38 goals and 91 points, in addition to John Purves, and Reggie Savage, having 40-plus goal seasons. Despite the goal scoring, the Skipjacks struggled in the new division placing fifth, and out of the playoffs.

In the 1992–93 AHL season, Barry Trotz became the new head coach. At 30 years old, Trotz was the youngest head coach in the AHL that season. The offense was led by John Byce with 35 goals, and 79 points, and goaltender Byron Dafoe played 48 of 80 games.

On March 26, 1993, team ownership announced pending relocation of the team to Portland, Maine, for the next season. The Skipjacks finished the season fourth place in the southern division, with the playoffs beginning on April 16, 1993, three weeks after the announced move. Facing first-place Binghamton in the playoffs, the Skipjacks extended the series to seven games, but lost 5–3 in the deciding game played on April 16, 1993. The next season, the team played as the Portland Pirates.

== Hockey culture in Baltimore ==
Three previous professional hockey teams in Baltimore were known as the Clippers including the Baltimore Clippers (1945–1949), the Baltimore Clippers (1954–1956), and the Baltimore Clippers (1962–1977). In a home game on March 8, 1980, the Clippers defeated the Utica Mohawks 5–4 in overtime. Spectators were excited by fighting between the teams and threw beer and other debris onto ice surface, which resulted in injuries and at least one arrest.

The Skipjacks were described as "beloved symbols" of Baltimore who adopted the city’s blue-collar worker persona as the gritty underdogs, and had an almost "belligerent pride" about being a working class town supporting hockey. Beginning in 1980, the Skipjacks had an uphill battle as they shared their arena with the Baltimore Blast of the Major Indoor Soccer League. The hockey team was consistently outdrawn by the soccer team and given second choice for nights of play. The Skipjacks did little marketing or promotion for the team. Their home games had no high-tech displays for crowds, compared promotions for sellout crowds at indoor soccer games. The Skipjacks averaged 2,660 fans a game through its first 17 home games in the 1980–81 season, the second lowest total in the AHL. Their arena could not make many Saturday nights from October to May available for hockey, and the team struggled to attract hockey fans from the suburbs to Downtown Baltimore, which has petty crime and homeless people on the street.

Team owner Tom Ebright stated that while Baltimore avid hockey fans, "there just weren't enough of them". Ebright claimed he lost $2.5 million in six years, and chose to relocate to Portland because of its "established fan base for hockey".

== Coaches ==
The Skipjacks and Clippers had seven different head coaches in fourteen seasons of play. Gene Ubriaco coached seven seasons in Baltimore, and won the Louis A. R. Pieri Memorial Award as American Hockey League Coach of the Year in the 1983–84 season. Five of the seven Baltimore coaches, were also head coaches of NHL teams, including Ubriaco, Angotti, Murray, MacLean, and Trotz.

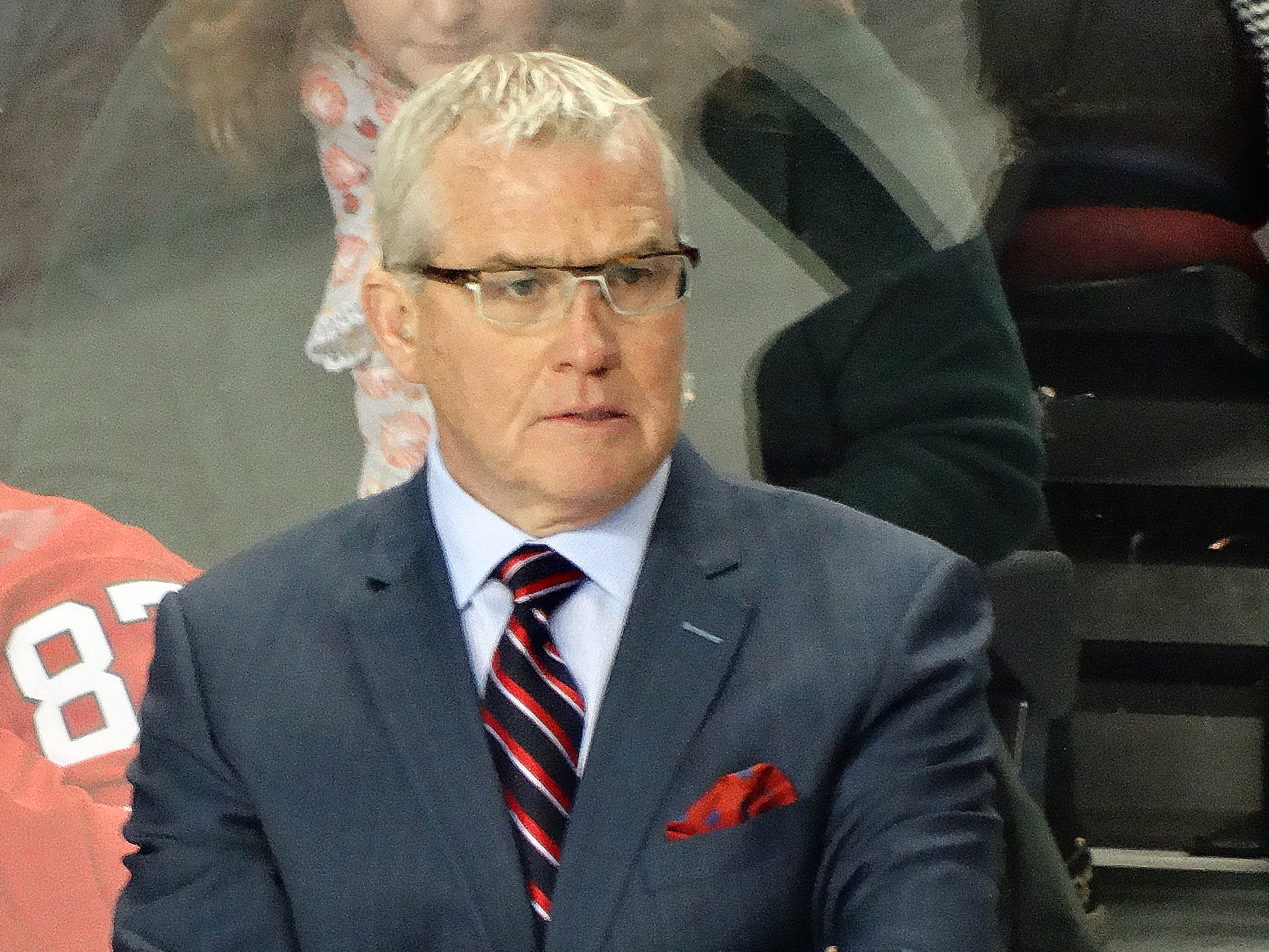
Doug MacLean in 2014

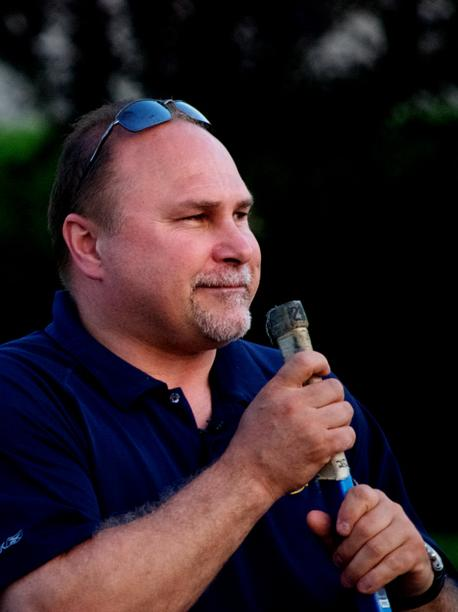
Barry Trotz in 2009

List of Baltimore Skipjacks head coaches
Season(s)	Coach
1979–81	Gene Ubriaco (2)
1981–82	Moose Lallo
1982–83	Lou Angotti
1983–88	Gene Ubriaco (5)
1988–89	Terry Murray
1989–90	Terry Murray & Doug MacLean
1990–92	Rob Laird (2)
1992–93	Barry Trotz
Source: (multiple seasons in parentheses)

== Players ==
Skipjacks alumni include over 140 players who also had NHL careers. Jim Stewart was the only player from the ACHL Skipjacks to play in the NHL. Thirteen players from the EHL Clippers went onto NHL careers. Mitch Lamoureux is the Baltimore Skipjacks career leader in goals (119), assists (133), and points (252). He was inducted into the AHL Hall of Fame in the class of 2011. Three Skipjacks also won season awards:

Annual AHL award winners
Season	Player	Award description	AHL award
1982–83	Mitch Lamoureux	Rookie of the year	Dudley "Red" Garrett Memorial Award
1982–83	Greg Tebbutt	Defenceman of the year	Eddie Shore Award
1984–85	Jon Casey	Best Goaltender	Aldege "Baz" Bastien Memorial Award
1984–85	Jon Casey	Lowest goals against average	Harry "Hap" Holmes Memorial Award

=== AHL Hall of Fame inductees ===
AHL Hall of Fame Honored Members
Name	Seasons	Induction Year
Bruce Boudreau	1984-85 (player)	2009
Mitch Lamoureux	1982-86 (player)	2011
Rob Murray	1988-91 (player)	2017
John Slaney	1991-93 (player)	2014
Tim Tookey	1983-85 (player)	2008

== Statistical records ==
Single season
Season	Player	Statistic
1982–83	Mitch Lamoureux	57 goals
1982–83	Mike Gillis	81 assists
1982–83	Mike Gillis	113 points
1986–87	Mitch Wilson	353 penalty minutes
1984–85	Jon Casey	4 shutouts
1984–85	Jon Casey	2.63 goals against average
Career
Seasons	Player	Statistic
1989–1993	Tim Taylor	259 games played
1982–1986	Mitch Lamoureux	119 goals
1982–1986	Mitch Lamoureux	133 assists
1982–1986	Mitch Lamoureux	252 points
1982–1987	Gary Rissling	868 penalty minutes
1988–1992	Jim Hrivnak	55 goaltending wins

== Season-by-season results ==
Season-by-season results in the regular season, and playoffs.

Season	Team	League	Regular season									Playoffs		
Season	Team	League	G	W	L	T	OTL	Points	GF	GA	Standing	1st round	2nd round	Finals
1979–80	Clippers	EHL	70	41	25	4	—	86	308	225	2nd, EHL	unknown	—	L, 1–4, Erie
1980–81	Clippers	EHL	72	29	36	7	—	65	278	286	4th, EHL	L, 0–4, Erie	—	—
1981–82	Skipjacks	ACHL	48	22	23	3	—	47	204	189	3rd, ACHL	L, 3–4, Mohawk Valley	—	—
1982–83	Skipjacks	AHL	80	35	36	9	—	79	362	366	5th, South	Out of playoffs		
1983–84	Skipjacks	AHL	80	46	24	10	—	102	384	304	1st, South	W, 4–0, Springfield	L, 2–4, Rochester	—
1984–85	Skipjacks	AHL	80	45	27	8	—	98	326	252	2nd, South	W, 4–1, Rochester	W, 4–0, Binghamton	L, 2–4, Sherbrooke
1985–86	Skipjacks	AHL	80	28	44	8	—	64	271	304	7th, South	Out of playoffs		
1986–87	Skipjacks	AHL	80	35	37	—	8	78	277	295	5th, South	Out of playoffs		
1987–88	Skipjacks	AHL	80	13	58	9	0	35	268	434	7th, South	Out of playoffs		
1988–89	Skipjacks	AHL	80	30	46	4	—	64	317	347	6th, South	Out of playoffs		
1989–90	Skipjacks	AHL	80	43	30	7	—	93	302	265	3rd, South	W, 4-2, Adirondack	L, 2–4, Rochester	—
1990–91	Skipjacks	AHL	80	39	34	7	—	85	325	289	3rd, South	L, 2–4, Binghamton	—	—
1991–92	Skipjacks	AHL	80	28	42	10	—	66	287	320	5th, South	Out of playoffs.		
1992–93	Skipjacks	AHL	80	28	40	12	—	68	318	353	4th, South	L, 3–4, Binghamton	—	—
