= Fitchburg Trappers =

The Fitchburg Trappers are a defunct minor league professional ice hockey team based in Fitchburg, Massachusetts that played in the Atlantic Coast Hockey League (ACHL) during the 1981–82 season.

They played just six games compiling a record of two wins and four losses under head coach Jean-Guy Gagnon.
