= Erie Blades =

American professional ice hockey team (1975–1982)

- City: Erie, Pennsylvania
- League: NAHL (1975–77); NEHL (1978–79); EHL (1979–81); AHL (1981–82)
- Operated: 1975–1982
- Home arena: Erie County Field House
- Colors: Navy blue, gold, white

Franchise history
- 1st Franchise
- 1975–1977: Erie Blades
- Second Franchise
- 1978–1982: Erie Blades
- 1982–1993: Baltimore Skipjacks
- 1993–2016: Portland Pirates
- 2016–present: Springfield Thunderbirds

Championships
- Regular season titles: 3: (1978–79 NEHL) (1979–80, 1980–81 EHL)
- Playoff championships: 3: (1978–79 NEHL) (1979–80, 1980–81 EHL)

The Erie Blades name was used by two professional ice hockey teams in Erie, Pennsylvania. Both teams played their home games in the Erie County Field House. After the second Blades team folded, the void was filled by the Erie Golden Blades, a team in the Atlantic Coast Hockey League from 1982 to 1987. They changed the colors from orange and black, to gold and blue with the name change.

== 1975–1977 ==
The first team was a member of the North American Hockey League from 1975 to 1977. Nick Polano was the team's coach both seasons. During the 1975–76 season, the Blades had primary affiliations with the Denver Spurs and Ottawa Civics of the World Hockey Association, in addition to the Fort Worth Texans and Tucson Mavericks in the Central Hockey League. During the 1976–77 season, the Blades had a primary affiliation with the Houston Aeros of the World Hockey Association. During both seasons, the Blades had secondary affiliations with the Los Angeles Kings and New York Islanders of the National Hockey League.

== 1978–1982 ==
The second team was a member of the Northeastern Hockey League during the 1978–79 season, then the Eastern Hockey League from 1979 to 1981. The Blades won three consecutive league championships during these seasons. Nick Polano coached the second Blades team for its first three seasons. The Blades had National Hockey League affiliations with the New York Islanders from 1978 to 1980, the Quebec Nordiques from 1979 to 1981, and the Buffalo Sabres for the 1980–81 season.

The Blades were then admitted to the American Hockey League for the 1981–82 season. Lou Angotti replaced Polano as the head coach in 1981. The Blades were affiliated with the Pittsburgh Penguins and Boston Bruins. After one season, the team was relocated to Baltimore, Maryland, merging with the Baltimore Skipjacks of the Atlantic Coast Hockey League, for the 1982–83 season. Coach Angotti and sixteen players were transferred to the Skipjacks.

== Season-by-season results ==
- Erie Blades 1975–1977 (North American Hockey League)
- Erie Blades 1978–1979 (Northeastern Hockey League)
- Erie Blades 1979–1981 (Eastern Hockey League)
- Erie Blades 1981–1982 (American Hockey League)

=== Regular season ===
Season	Games	Won	Lost	Tied	Points	Goals for	Goals against	Standing
1975–76	74	37	36	1	75	310	298	3rd, West
1976–77	74	37	33	4	78	257	251	5th, NAHL
1978–79	69	47	19	3	97	344	260	1st, NEHL
1979–80	70	46	21	3	95	349	241	1st, EHL
1980–81	72	52	14	6	110	407	252	1st, EHL
1981–82	80	22	52	6	50	317	425	6th, South

=== Playoffs ===
Season	1st round	2nd round	Finals
1975–76	Lost	––	––
1976–77	Won	Lost	––
1978–79	Champions		
1979–80	Champions		
1980–81	Champions		
1981–82	Out of playoffs		
