= Cape Cod Buccaneers =

- City: South Yarmouth, Massachusetts
- League: Atlantic Coast Hockey League
- Founded: 1981
- Operated: 1981–82
- Home arena: Cape Cod Coliseum
- Owner(s): Vince McMahon
- General manager: Jim Troy
- Head coach: Jim Troy

Franchise history
- 1981–82: Cape Cod Buccaneers

The Cape Cod Buccaneers were a professional ice hockey team based in South Yarmouth, Massachusetts on Cape Cod. They were an inaugural member of the Atlantic Coast Hockey League and were owned by future WWE CEO Vince McMahon.

== History ==
McMahon owned the Cape Cod Coliseum and wanted to secure an American Hockey League franchise for the arena. When he was unable to finalize plans for the 1981–82 season, McMahon was approached by Frazier Gleason of Indianapolis who wanted to run a franchise in the new Atlantic Coast Hockey League. Gleason and McMahon worked together during the early stages of building the team; however, McMahon assumed full control over the franchise after it became evident that Gleason did not have sufficient funds to run the team. McMahon hired former New Haven Nighthawks right wing Jim Troy to serve as the team's coach and general manager.

After the first month of the season, two of the league's franchises folded. On February 1, 1982, the Winston-Salem Thunderbirds announced that they would have to fold, unless the season ended early. The league went into an emergency meeting and decided to hold the post-season immediately. McMahon disagreed with the decision, which he felt would hurt the league's credibility, and chose to fold the team. In their only season in the ACHL, the Buccaneers went 17-21-1.
