= List of U.S. cities by number of professional sports championships =

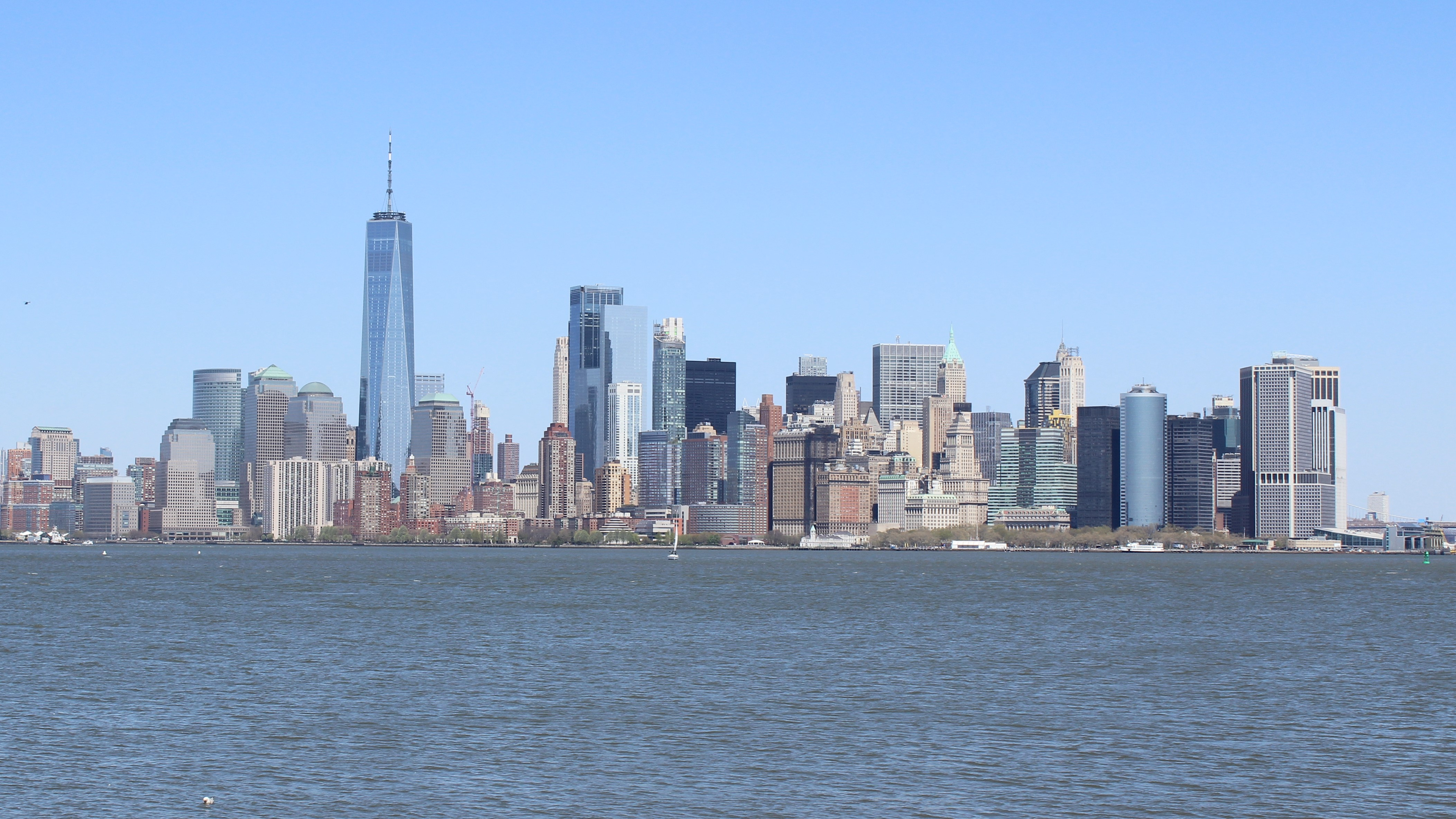
New York City has won the most professional sports championships of any American city.

This is a list of cities in the United States that field or have fielded teams in North American men's professional sports leagues, showing the number of league championships each city has won. The championships won are recorded for the cities only, not the individual franchises. When a team relocates to a new city, the number of championships won in the prior city remain with that city.

Championships counted are only from the top-tier/dominant league or leagues in each of the four major North American team sports: American football, baseball, basketball, and ice hockey.

Cities that can claim no titles have been excluded from these rankings unless they are currently represented in at least one of the four major leagues, in which case they have a zero total.

== Table ==
Current through the 2026 World Series, completed on October 28, 2026.

Note: Championships are credited to a team's metropolitan area, not necessarily the municipality in which games were played.

Rank	City	MLB	NBA	NFL	NHL	Total	Most recent
1	New York City	35	3	9	11	58	2026
2	Boston	10	18	6	6	40	2024
3	Chicago	6	6	11	6	29	2016
4	Los Angeles	9	12	3	3	27	2025
5	Detroit	4	3	4	11	22	2008
6	San Francisco	7	5	7	0	19	2022
7	Pittsburgh	5	-	6	5	16	2017
8	St. Louis	11	1	1	1	14	2019
9	Philadelphia	2	3	6	2	13	2025
9	Green Bay	-	-	13	-	13	2011
11	Baltimore	3	1	5	-	9	2013
11	Cleveland	2	1	6	0	9	2016
11	Dallas	1	1	6	1	9	2023
11	Miami	2	3	2	2	9	2025
11	Washington	2	1	5	1	9	2019
16	Denver	0	1	3	3	7	2023
16	Minneapolis	2	5	0	0	7	1991
18	Kansas City	2	0	4	0	6	2024
19	Cincinnati	5	-	0	-	5	1990
19	San Antonio	-	5	-	-	5	2014
19	Tampa	0	-	2	3	5	2021
22	Houston	2	2	0	-	4	2022
22	Milwaukee	2	2	0	-	4	2026
22	Seattle	0	1	2	1	4	2026
25	Atlanta	2	0	0	0	2	2021
25	Canton	-	-	2	-	2	1923
25	Raleigh	-	-	-	2	2	2026
28	Indianapolis	-	0	1	-	1	2007
28	Las Vegas	-	-	0	1	1	2023
28	New Orleans	-	0	1	-	1	2010
28	Oklahoma City	-	1	-	-	1	2025
28	Phoenix	1	0	0	0	1	2001
28	Portland	-	1	-	-	1	1977
28	Providence	-	0	1	-	1	1928
28	Rochester	-	1	0	-	1	1951
28	Syracuse	-	1	-	-	1	1955

== See also ==
- List of North American cities by number of major sports championships
