= Major professional sports leagues in the United States and Canada =

Major professional sports leagues in the United States and Canada, which compete in baseball, basketball, football, ice hockey, and soccer, include Major League Baseball (MLB), the National Basketball Association (NBA), the National Football League (NFL), the National Hockey League (NHL), and Major League Soccer (MLS). The NFL only competes in the United States, with the prominent football league in Canada being the Canadian Football League (CFL).

MLB, the NBA, the NFL, and the NHL are commonly referred to as the "Big Four". Each of these is the wealthiest professional club competition in its sport worldwide and, along with the Premier League, make up the top five sports leagues by revenue in the world.

Each of the major professional leagues averages at least 15,000 fans in attendance per game as of 2024. The NFL has the largest stadiums on average in the world, ranging in capacity from just over 60,000 to almost 100,000 spectators, while MLB ballparks generally hold between 30,000 and 50,000 fans. Venues used primarily by MLS and CFL vary more widely in capacity, from about 20,000 to about 60,000. (Note: While a few MLS teams play in NFL stadiums, the upper decks of such venues are often partially or entirely closed for MLS matches, leading to an effective capacity closer to that of a typical MLS soccer-specific stadium.) The two indoor leagues, the NHL and NBA, play mostly in arenas that hold 18,000 to 20,000 seats. Many multi-purpose venues host events in multiple leagues, including: NFL and MLS (5), (Note: Atlanta (Mercedes-Benz Stadium), Charlotte (Bank of America Stadium), Chicago (Soldier Field through the 2027–28 MLS season, after which Chicago Fire FC will move into the new McDonald's Park), Foxborough (Gillette Stadium), and Seattle (Lumen Field).) CFL and MLS (2), (Note: Toronto (BMO Field) and Vancouver (BC Place)) MLB and MLS (1), (Note: New York (Yankee Stadium through the 2027 MLS "Sprint Season" [an abbreviated season to accommodate the league's move to a summer-to-spring calendar in July 2027], after which New York City FC will open the new Etihad Park.)) and NBA and NHL (11). (Note: Boston (TD Garden), Chicago (United Center), Dallas (American Airlines Center), Denver (Ball Arena), Detroit (Little Caesars Arena), Los Angeles (Crypto.com Arena), New York (Madison Square Garden), Philadelphia (Xfinity Mobile Arena), Salt Lake City (Delta Center), Toronto (Scotiabank Arena), and Washington D.C. (Capital One Arena)) MLB and NFL teams frequently shared stadiums in the past, although none currently do. The NFL and MLB also play a limited number of annual games in English Premier League stadiums, (Note: Principally Tottenham Hotspur Stadium.) and the NFL plays a limited number of annual games in stadiums of Germany's Bundesliga, (Note: Specifically Allianz Arena, Deutsche Bank Park, and Berlin's Olympiastadion, the last of which hosted its first NFL game in 2025.) and less often plays games in stadiums of Mexico's Liga MX, (Note: Specifically Estadio Azteca.) Brazil's Brasileirão, (Note: Specifically Arena Corinthians, which hosted NFL games in 2024 and 2025, and Maracanã Stadium, which hosted its first NFL game in 2026.) Spain's La Liga, (Note: Specifically the Bernabéu, which hosted its first NFL game in 2025.) and the Australian Football League. (Note: Specifically the Melbourne Cricket Ground, which hosted its first NFL game in 2026.)

All major professional leagues except the CFL currently have 30 to 32 teams each, most of which are concentrated in the most populous metropolitan areas of the United States and Canada. Unlike the promotion and relegation systems used in sports leagues in various other regions around the world, American and Canadian sports leagues are closed leagues that maintain the same teams from season-to-season. Expansion of the league usually occurs by adding newly formed teams, though mergers with competing leagues have also occurred.

Baseball, American football, and ice hockey have had professional leagues continuously for over 100 years; early leagues such as the National Association of Professional Base Ball Players, the Ohio League, and the National Hockey Association formed the basis of the modern MLB, NFL, and NHL, respectively. Basketball was invented in 1891, and its first professional league formed in the 1920s. The Basketball Association of America, founded in 1946, formed the basis of the NBA in 1949 and has lasted for over 75 years.

Soccer was first professionalized in 1894, with past American-based leagues including the American Soccer League (1921–1933) (ASL) and the original North American Soccer League (NASL). MLS was established in 1996.

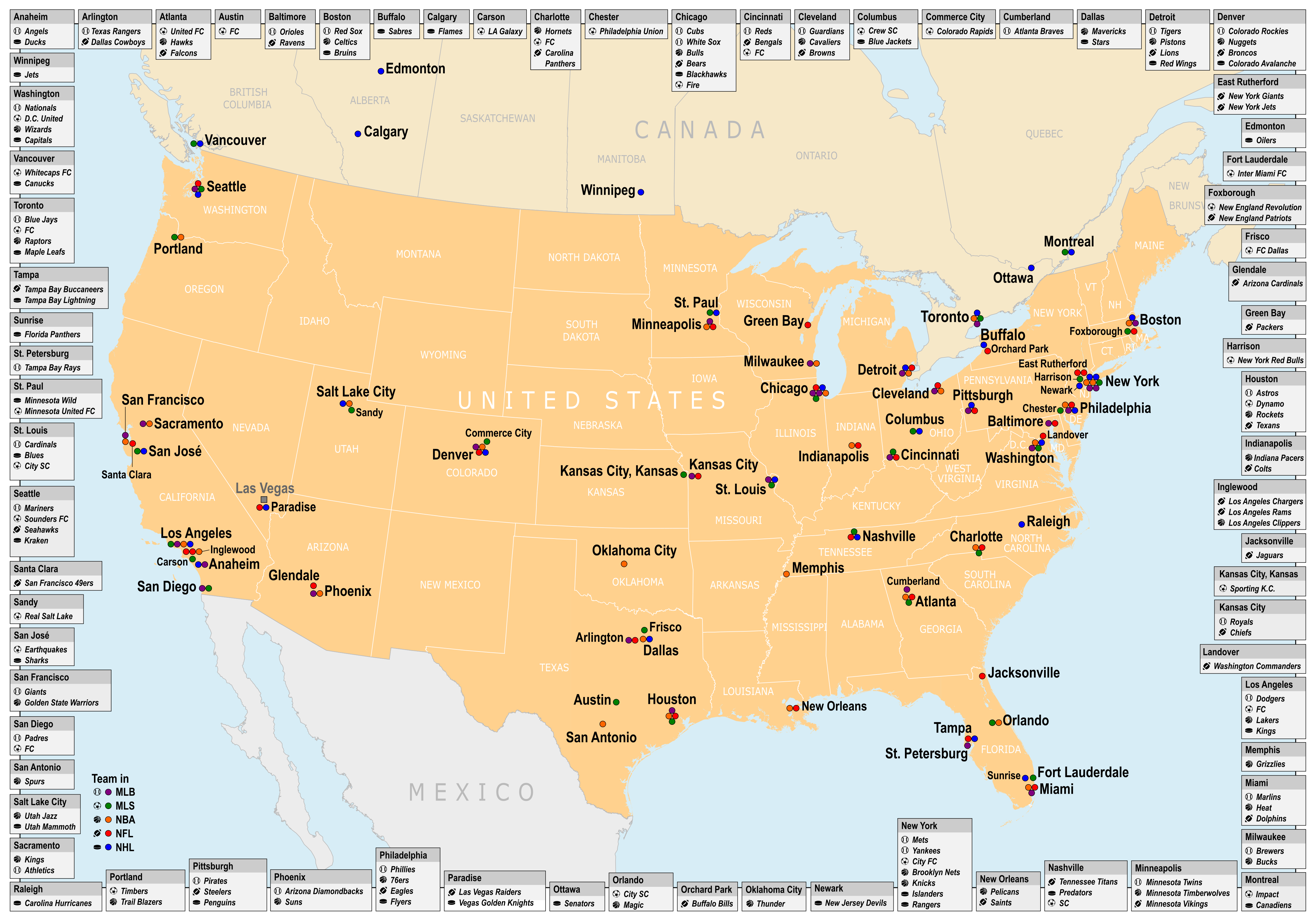
All cities in the United States and Canada with at least one team in MLB, NBA, NFL, NHL, or MLS in 2025

== Major professional leagues ==
=== Major League Baseball ===
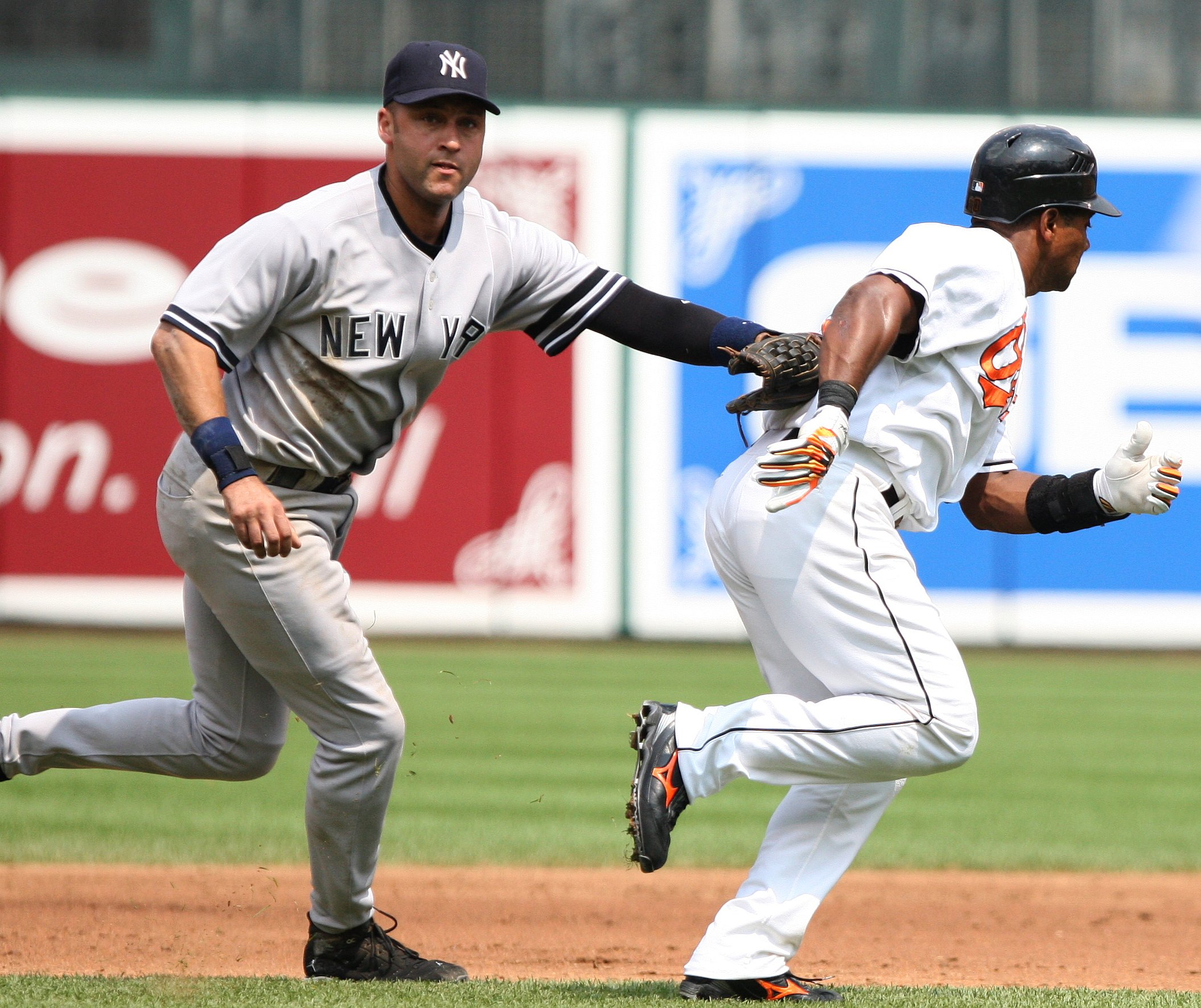
Major League Baseball (MLB)

Major League Baseball is the highest level of play of baseball in the United States and Canada, and the oldest of the major American leagues. It consists of the National League (founded in 1876) and the American League (founded in 1901). Cooperation between the two leagues began in 1903 inasmuch as the two league champions began playing a "World Series". In 1904, however, there was no World Series played because one of the league champions refused to play. During the offseason, the owners of each league voted to have the league champions automatically play one another in the World Series and it was 90 years until another World Series was not played, in 1994, due to a work stoppage. The two leagues merged on an organizational level in 2000 with the elimination of separate league offices; they have shared a single commissioner since 1920. There are currently 30 member teams, with 29 located in the U.S. and 1 in Canada. Traditionally called the "national pastime", baseball was the first professional team sport in the U.S. MLB consistently draws the largest total attendance of any sports league in the world.

=== National Basketball Association ===
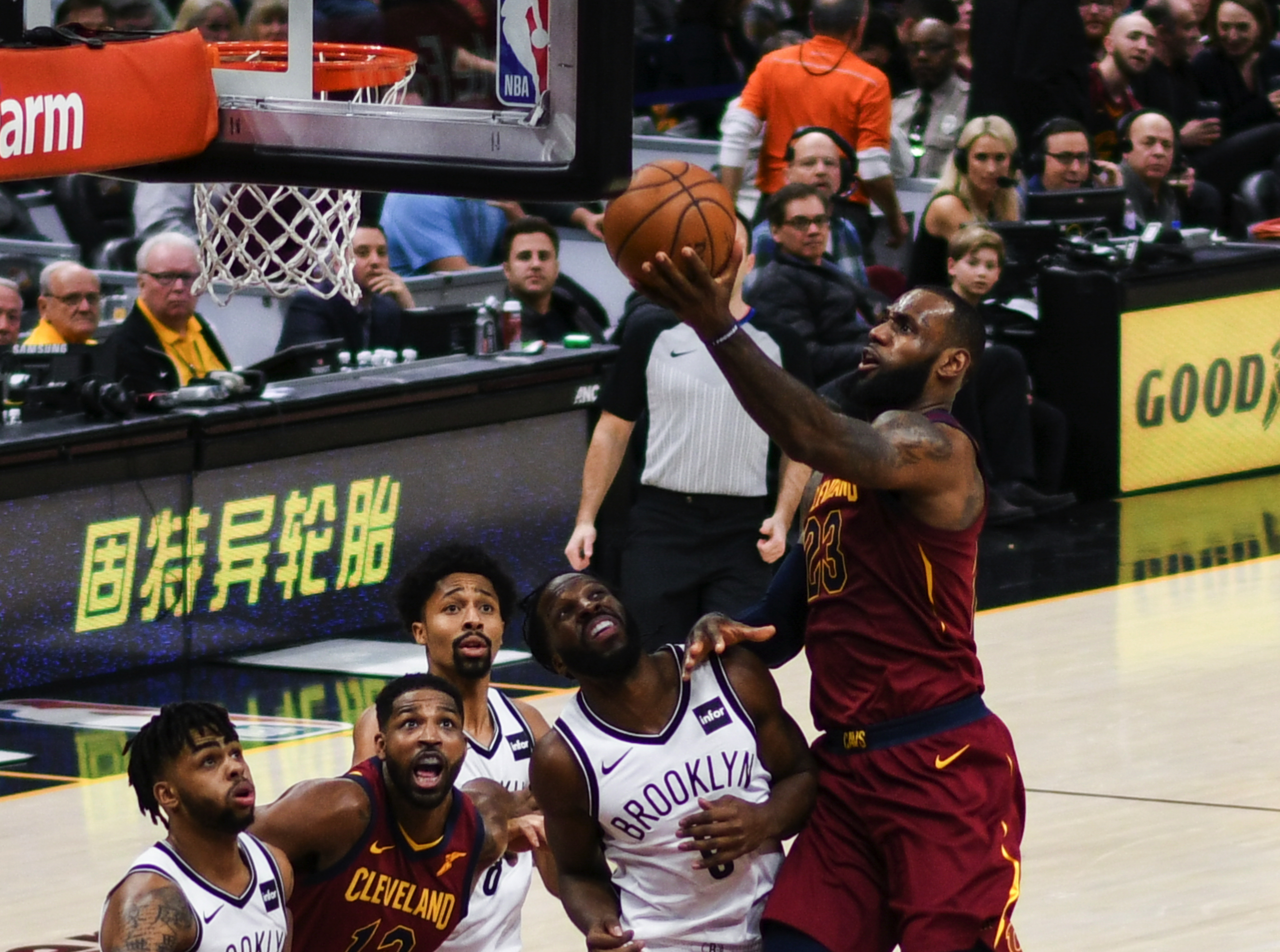
National Basketball Association (NBA)

The National Basketball Association was described by Josh Martin of Bleacher Report as "the best basketball league in the world" in a 2012 power ranking of international leagues, and it is the youngest of the major American leagues. It was founded in 1949 with the merger of the Basketball Association of America (BAA) and the National Basketball League (NBL) though it later adopted the BAA's founding date in 1946 as its own. Four teams from the rival American Basketball Association joined the NBA with the ABA–NBA merger in 1976. It currently has 30 teams, 29 in the United States and 1 in Canada. The NBA is watched by audiences both domestically and internationally, and as of 2026 it is by far the most globally popular sports league among the NFL, NHL, and MLB. According to October 2026 research from S&P Global Market Intelligence, four times as many international viewers follow NBA games compared to the National Football League, while a 2024 Brand Finance report estimates that more than 75% of the NBA's social media followers live outside the United States. Across Western social networks (Facebook, Instagram, X, and TikTok), a Qualtrics brand-follower analysis shows the NBA's official league accounts command 206.7 million followers, more than double the NFL's 100.4 million and over five times Major League Baseball's (MLB) 40.4 million, even before factoring in the NBA's Chinese digital presence of 44 million followers on Weibo (per Jing Daily) and 4.9 million on Douyin as far back as 2019 (per Digiday). Broadcast in over 200 countries and territories across 42 to more than 50 languages, the NBA serves as North America's premier global sports export, recording a 28% year-over-year surge in international Prime Video viewership during the 2025–26 debut season of its 11-year, $76 billion media cycle. While the NBA is the most viewed basketball league in Canada, Canada Basketball recognizes the Canadian Elite Basketball League as the country's first-division professional league.

=== National Football League ===
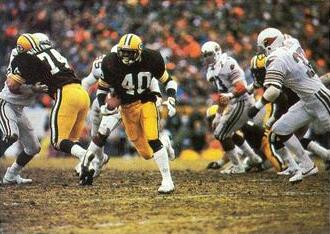
National Football League (NFL)

The National Football League is a professional American football league and was founded in 1920 as a combination of various teams from regional leagues such as the Ohio League, the New York Pro Football League, and the Chicago circuit as a successor to Western Pennsylvania Professional Football Circuit. For its first two seasons, 1920 and 1921, it was known as the "American Professional Football Association" (APFA) before changing its name to the current name in 1922. The NFL partially absorbed the All-America Football Conference in 1949 and merged with the American Football League in 1970. It has 32 teams, all located in the United States. As of 2015, NFL games have the largest per-game attendance among domestic professional leagues in the world, and is the most popular league in the U.S. in terms of television ratings and merchandising. Its championship game, the Super Bowl, is the most watched annual event on U.S. television, with Super Bowl LIX being the single most-watched program in U.S. television history. The NFL is the only one of the "Big Four" leagues not to have a team in Canada, where the Canadian Football League is the premier professional league in a similar gridiron football sport of Canadian football.

=== National Hockey League ===
National Hockey League (NHL)

The National Hockey League is widely recognized as the world's premier professional ice hockey league, and is the only "Big Four" league to have been founded in Canada. It was formed in 1917 as a successor to the Canadian National Hockey Association (founded in 1909), taking all but one of the NHA's teams. The NHL partially absorbed the rival World Hockey Association in 1979. There are 32 teams, with 25 in the United States and 7 in Canada. The most popular sports league in Canada, and widely followed across the northern and northeastern U.S., the NHL has expanded westward and southward in recent decades to attempt to gain a more national following in the United States, in cities such as Denver, San Jose, Dallas, Miami, Nashville, Salt Lake City, Raleigh, Tampa, Las Vegas, and Seattle with varying success. The NHL has more Canadian teams (seven) than MLB, the NBA, and MLS combined (five).

=== Major League Soccer ===
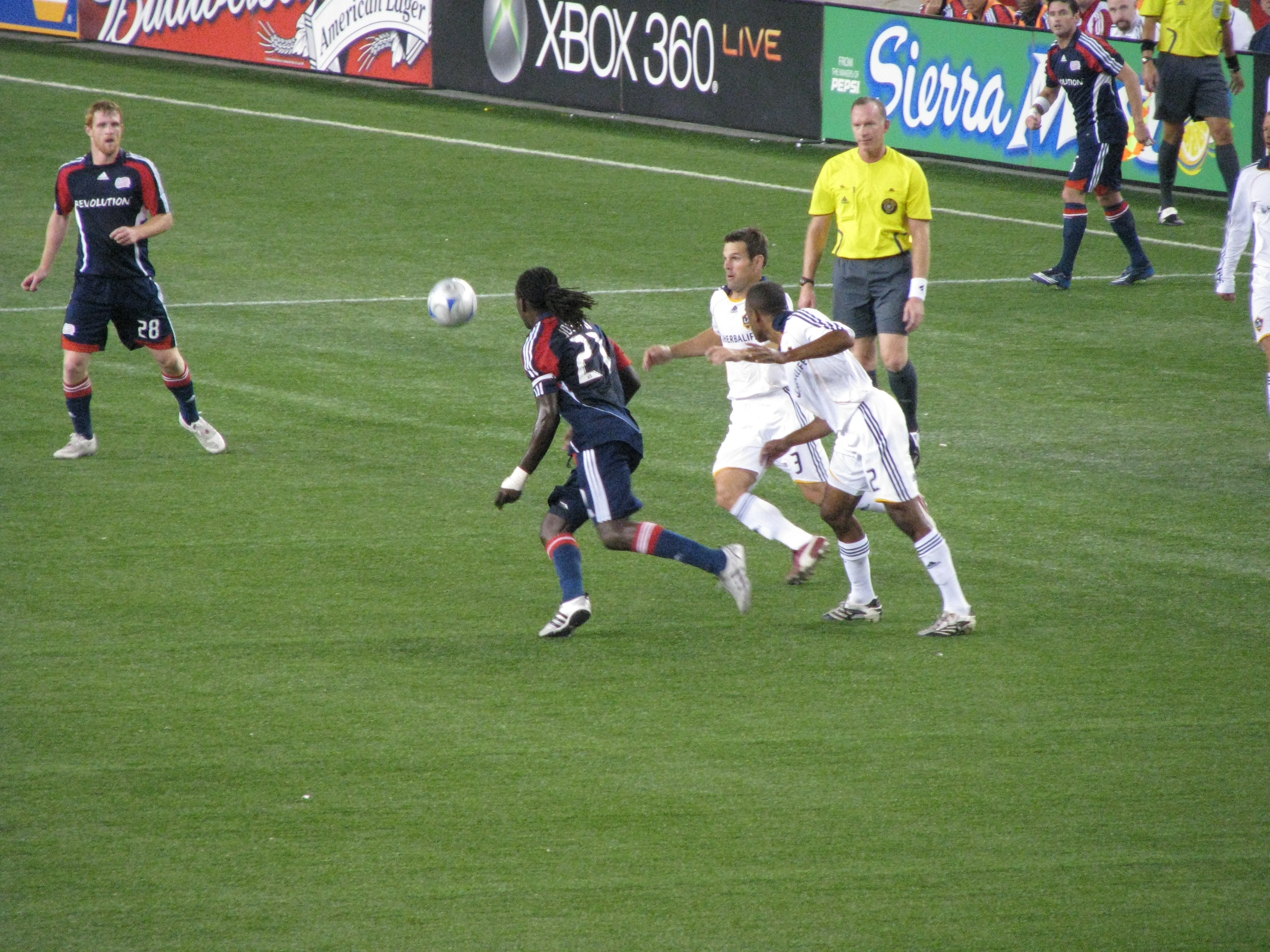
Major League Soccer (MLS)

Major League Soccer, operating in the United States and Canada, is the top-level men's professional soccer league in the U.S., while the top-level soccer league sanctioned by the Canadian Soccer Association is the Canadian Premier League (CPL). As of the league's 2026 season, MLS has 30 teams, with 27 in the U.S. and 3 in Canada. The league began play in 1996, its creation a requirement by FIFA for awarding the U.S. the right to host the 1994 World Cup. MLS was the first major Division I outdoor soccer league in the U.S. since the North American Soccer League (NASL) operated from 1968 to 1984. MLS has increased in popularity following the adoption of the Designated Player Rule in 2007, which allowed MLS to sign stars such as David Beckham (from whom the rule took its colloquial name 'the Beckham rule'), Thierry Henry, and Lionel Messi. In 2017, MLS reported an average attendance of 22,112 per game, with total attendance exceeding 8.2 million overall, both breaking previous MLS attendance records, while 2018 saw Atlanta United FC break multiple single-game attendance records, with crowd figures of over 70,000 among the highest team attendances worldwide.

With a total attendance of nearly 11 million and an average of over 22,000, MLS has the fifth-largest total attendance and third-largest average attendance among sports leagues in the U.S. and Canada and has the seventh-highest attendance among global professional soccer leagues.

MLS is unique among U.S. and Canadian major sports leagues in that the teams take part in multiple separate tournaments outside the MLS regular and playoff season; the knockout U.S. Open Cup for U.S. teams and Canadian Championship for Canadian teams, cross-border/regional Leagues Cup and Campeones Cup, the continental CONCACAF Champions Cup, and possibly the intercontinental/worldwide FIFA Intercontinental Cup and FIFA Club World Cup.

=== Canadian Football League ===
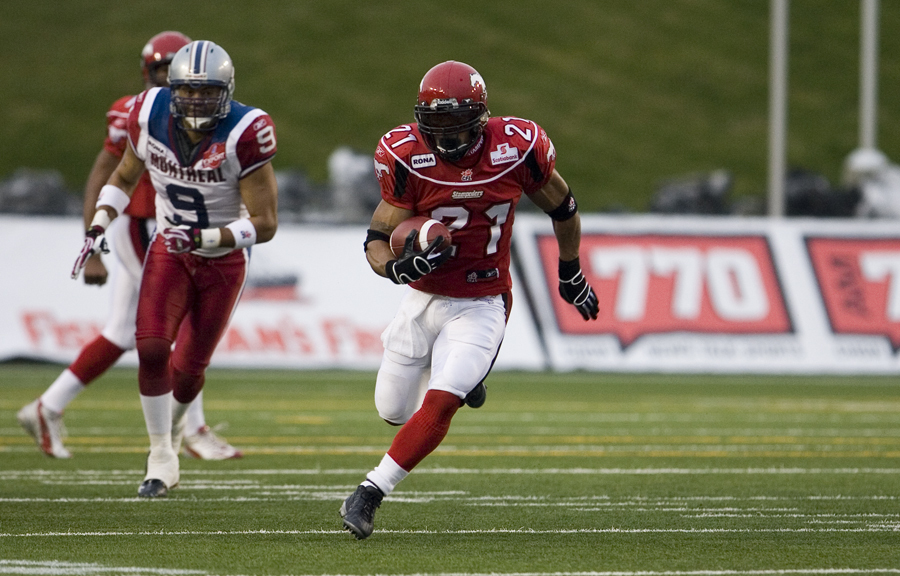
Canadian Football League (CFL)

The Canadian Football League is the highest level of play in Canadian football. The league was organized in 1956 as a cooperative agreement between two regional leagues, the Interprovincial Rugby Football Union (which dated to 1907) and the Western Interprovincial Football Union (which was founded in 1936), and became independent from the Canadian Rugby Union (Note: Despite its misleading name, the CRU was the governing body for Canadian football, not rugby) in 1958. The league now consists of nine teams, all based in Canada. The Grey Cup is awarded annually to the champion every November and is the highest-attended sporting event in the nation. The oldest extant teams, the Hamilton Tiger-Cats and the Toronto Argonauts, trace their origins to the late 1860s and early 1870s, which ranks them amongst the oldest professional sports teams of any kind still in existence on the continent. From 1993 to 1995, the CFL attempted expansion into the United States to cities without NFL teams, but all the clubs folded, while the management structure of the Baltimore Stallions was moved to a relaunched Montreal Alouettes franchise. By 2009 the CFL was the second-most-popular league in Canada, after the NHL. A 2023 study shows that interest in the CFL had dropped over the previous 10 years.

The CFL has the fourth-highest average attendance of leagues in the United States and Canada, behind the NFL, MLB and MLS. As of 2024, the CFL's average attendance number was 22,795, continuing a slow upward trend for the league. Its level of play is generally recognized as on the second tier of professional football, with the CFL having a slight advantage in player recruitment compared to second-tier American leagues such as the UFL due to the CFL's longer established history.

== Traits of these major leagues ==
=== Overview ===
Major professional sports leagues are distinguished from other sports leagues in terms of business and economic factors, popularity of the league, and quality of play. The following table compares the major leagues on certain attributes, such as the longevity and stability of each league, as measured by the number of teams, the year founded, the last time the league underwent expansion, contraction, and relocation, and annual revenue.

League	Sport	Teams	Year founded	Last expansion	Last contraction	Last relocation	Revenue US$ (bn)
National Football League	American football	32	1920 (Note: The NFL was originally called the American Professional Football Association and adopted its present name in 1922. Other "founding" dates recognized to be of significance by the NFL include the founding of the American Football League (originally a rival league) in 1960; the 1966 merger agreement between the AFL and NFL, which established what eventually became the Super Bowl; and the completion of the AFL–NFL merger in 1970. In particular, 1966 is considered a significant epoch by football historians as the start of the "Super Bowl era", while the 1970 merger remains the only time a rival North American sports league has fully merged into an established league with all of its teams intact and its playing records fully recognized as part of the history of the older league. The NFL had earlier partially absorbed the All-America Football Conference (founded in 1947) in 1950, but unlike the latter case with the AFL, the NFL did not recognize AAFC records until 2025.)	2002	1952 (Note: This date reflects the demise of the original Dallas Texans, who folded after only one season. However, the Texans were immediately replaced by the Baltimore Colts, meaning the league was not reduced in size for the 1953 season. Although the Colts were awarded the assets (including player contracts) of the Texans, they are considered a separate franchise. The last time the league fielded fewer teams for a subsequent season was after the 1950 season, when the original Baltimore Colts (also considered to be unrelated to the modern Colts franchise) folded. Also, the date in the table does not recognize the temporary 1995 suspension of the Cleveland Browns in which the then-extant Cleveland football organization was transferred to what was considered an expansion franchise in Baltimore – because the Browns were later restocked via an expansion draft after a three-year absence, the NFL does not consider this event to be a contraction.)	2020	$16.9
Major League Baseball	Baseball	30	1903 (Note: This date reflects the year the modern World Series was first contested, although an earlier version of the Series was contested in the 1880s between the National League and the defunct American Association. The two component leagues of Major League Baseball, the National and American Leagues, were founded in 1876 and 1901 respectively. MLB also celebrates the anniversary of the start of professional baseball in 1869. MLB underwent a major organizational change following the 1920 season when the office of Commissioner of Baseball, with far more significant powers over both leagues than the earlier National Commission that had preceded this office, was established. The AL and NL commenced regular season interleague play in 1997 and fully merged on an organizational level, i.e. they abolished their separate league offices and vested all authority in the office of the Commissioner, after the 1999 season.)	1998	1902 (Note: The elimination of four NL teams following the 1899 season is undoubtedly the most recent occasion where MLB has fielded fewer teams for the following season; however, some baseball historians regard the original Baltimore Orioles to have folded outright following the 1902 MLB season, and replaced by an expansion team that eventually became the New York Yankees for the following season, in a manner similar to the NFL's last "contraction" as listed in this table.)	2025	$10.9
National Basketball Association	Basketball	30	1946 (Note: This date reflects the establishment of the Basketball Association of America, which adopted its current name after absorbing the rival National Basketball League in 1950. Although the NBL predated the BAA by nine seasons, the NBA continues to regard the 1946–47 BAA season (as opposed to the 1937–38 NBL season) to be its inaugural one. The NBA has always awarded an internally-created trophy to its champions – the league adopted the trophy's present design in 1977 and its current name (the Larry O'Brien Championship Trophy) in 1984. The NBA later partially absorbed the rival American Basketball Association (founded in 1967) in 1976.)	2004	1954	2008	$10.9
National Hockey League	Ice hockey	32	1917 (Note: The Stanley Cup was first awarded in 1893, but did not become the NHL's de facto championship trophy until 1926. Although the NHL recognizes its founding date as 1917, three of its four charter members had previously been members of the National Hockey Association founded in 1910. Upon its founding, the NHL assumed the NHA's then-extant position as the eastern challenger for the Stanley Cup, which at the time was a trophy contested between the champions of the NHA/NHL and various leagues based in Western Canada and the U.S. Pacific Northwest. This arrangement continued until 1926 when the last major western-based league folded, after which the NHL took sole possession of the Stanley Cup to be awarded to its playoff champion ever since. The NHL later partially absorbed the rival World Hockey Association (founded in 1972) in 1979.)	2021 (Note: The Arizona Coyotes were deactivated, and later folded outright, after the 2023–24 season, with its organization relocating to Salt Lake City, Utah, to officially begin operations as an expansion team. The last time the NHL downsized was in 1978 with the merger of the Cleveland Barons into the Minnesota North Stars; the last time the league increased in size was 2021 with the launch of the Seattle Kraken; the last time the league relocated an organization without deactivation and outright folding was in 2011 when the Atlanta Thrashers relocated to Winnipeg, Manitoba, to become the second incarnation of the Winnipeg Jets)	1978	2011	$6.8
Major League Soccer	Soccer	30	1993	2025	2014 (Note: This date reflects the demise of Chivas USA, which was folded by the league after the 2014 season. However, the only occasion when MLS fielded fewer teams for a subsequent season was after the 2001 season, when the league went from 12 teams to 10 with the folding of both of its Florida teams. The 2015 season, the first after Chivas' demise, saw two new teams enter the league.)	2006	$2.0
Canadian Football League	Canadian football	9	1958 (Note: The Grey Cup was first awarded in 1909. The CFL was formed under its present name by the merger of the Interprovincial Rugby Football Union and the Western Interprovincial Football Union, founded in 1907 and 1936, respectively, however these leagues had already been the only two competing for the Grey Cup since the 1955 season. For this reason, either this season or the immediately preceding one (when the BC Lions joined the WIFU) is often reckoned to be the start of the "modern era" of Canadian football. Moreover, although the IRFU and WIFU changed their names to the Eastern and Western Football Conferences (now "Divisions") respectively, they did not begin inter-sectional regular season play until 1961, did not fully harmonize their regular season calendars and lengths until 1974 and did not fully merge on an organizational level until 1981.)	2014	2006	1995	$0.2

=== Seasons ===
The table below represents typical seasons for each league by month. Blank denotes off-season and solid colors mark preseason, regular season, and postseason. Leagues in the same sport use the same color. There is some variation between years. For example, depending on the length of the World Series, it may end in either late October or early November.

- "E" denotes exhibition or preseason play.
- "R" denotes regular season play.
- "P" denotes playoffs or postseason play.
- "C" denotes championship game or series.

League	# Games	Jan	Feb	Mar	Apr	May	Jun	Jul	Aug	Sep	Oct	Nov	Dec
NFL	17	R P	C	–					E	R			
MLB	162	–	E	E R	R						P C	C	–
NBA	82	R			R P	P	P C	–			E R	R	
NHL	84	R			R P	P	P C	–		E R	R	R	
MLS (Note: MLS will change from its current spring-to-fall calendar to a summer-to-spring calendar in 2027. An abbreviated 2027 season will be held from February to May, with subsequent seasons starting in July and ending the following May.)	34	E	E R	R							R P	P	C
CFL	18	–				E	R					P C	–

=== Revenues ===
Annual revenue by league (U.S. dollars)
League	Revenues (bn)	TV revenue	Ref.
NFL	$16.9	$9.1bn	
MLB	$10.7	$2.1bn	
NBA	$8.8	$2.6bn	
NHL	$5.1	$625m	
MLS	$2.0	$250m	
CFL	$0.2	$50m	

The "Big Four" leagues each have revenues that can be many times greater than the payrolls of less popular sports leagues in the two nations. In terms of overall league revenue, the NFL, MLB, and NBA rank as the top three most lucrative sports leagues in the world, with the English Premier League and the NHL ranked at fourth and fifth place.

=== Television exposure ===
Games of the "Big Four" leagues are televised on the four largest U.S. broadcast TV networks—ABC, CBS, NBC, and Fox. They enjoy strong TV viewer ratings, and their leagues earn significant revenues from these TV contracts.

All of the top four major sports leagues have had television contracts with at least one of the original "big three" U.S. broadcast television networks (ABC, CBS, and NBC) since those networks' early years, indicative of the sports' widespread appeal since their inception, continuing today additionally with Fox. In Canada, the NHL was broadcast on the stations of the Canadian Broadcasting Corporation from 1952 to 2026, and the CFL was on the CBC from 1952 to 2008, with leading commercial network CTV carrying games from 1961 to 1987, and again since 2024. In Canada, there is only one MLB team and one NBA team, and no Canadian NFL team exists; therefore, the U.S. national telecasts for those three leagues are usually simulcast by a Canadian broadcaster.

TV exposure and revenues in the U.S. (Leagues ranked in order of TV ratings)
League	Ratings / viewers	US TV rev.
NFL	10 / 16.6m (aggregate)	$9.0 bn
NBA	2.3 / 3.9m (ABC, 16 games); 1.1 / 1.7m (TNT, 52 games); 1.1 / 1.7m (ESPN, 76 games)	$2.7 bn
MLB	1.4 / 2.1m (Fox, 12 games); 0.8 / 1.1m (ESPN, 16 games); 0.3 / 0.4m (FS1, 40 games); 0.2 / 0.3m (TBS, 13 games)	$2.0 bn
NHL	1.3m (ESPN, 75 games); 0.3m (TNT, 72 games)	$625 m
MLS	undisclosed (Apple)	$250 m

The NFL has the largest TV contracts, and earns roughly $9 billion annually from its contracts with Amazon, CBS, ESPN, Fox, NBC, and DirecTV for the 2023 through 2033 seasons. MLB earns approximately $2 billion annually for 2026 to 2028 from its national contracts with Fox, Turner, ESPN, NBC, Netflix, and Apple TV.

The NBA's current TV deal, which took effect in 2025–26 and runs through the 2035–36 season, is with ABC/ESPN, NBC, Peacock, and Amazon, and also covers the WNBA for its 2026–2036 seasons. It is expected to generate total annual revenues of $6.9 billion, with a reported split of roughly $6.7 billion for the NBA and $200 million for the WNBA. This was a dramatic increase from the NBA's most recently expired television deal with ABC/ESPN and TNT, which ran from 2016–17 to 2024–25 and generated annual league TV revenues of $2.7 billion.

The NHL's current U.S. television deal with ABC/ESPN and Turner Sports took effect with the 2021–22 season and runs through 2027–28. While the NHL did not announce the amount, outside reports indicated that ABC and ESPN parent company Disney was paying a total of about $400 million and Turner about $225 million annually. This $625 million annual contract for American rights is in addition to the $433 million annual fee Rogers Sportsnet paid for Canadian rights in a deal that started in 2014–15 and ended in 2025–26. In April 2025, the NHL announced a new 12-year agreement for Canadian rights with Rogers for C$11 billion (approximately US$7.7 billion at the time of announcement) that started in 2026–27 and runs through 2037–38.

All four major sports leagues have launched a network of their own—NBA TV in the U.S. in 1999 and in Canada in 2001, the NFL Network in 2003, the NHL Network in Canada in 2001 and in the U.S. in 2007, and the MLB Network in 2009. All networks remain in operation today except for the Canadian NHL Network, which was shut down shortly before the league's 2015–16 season.

Teams in MLB, the NBA, and the NHL—which play several days per week—negotiate contracts with local broadcasters to air most of their games, both terrestrial networks and regional sports networks. Some teams (such as the New York Yankees) may even partially or fully own the cable network upon which their games are broadcast, and often receive more revenue from local broadcasts than any other source. The collective revenue earned by all MLB clubs is multiple billion dollars annually. NFL teams, which generally play once per week, do not negotiate local broadcast contracts, but are allowed to negotiate their own television deals for preseason games with syndication and broadcast stations.

The current MLS broadcast deals took effect with the 2023 season. The league's primary media partner is Apple, which paid a reported $2.5 billion for exclusive worldwide streaming rights from 2023 to 2032. All league games are streamed on the MLS Season Pass service on Apple TV (known as Apple TV+ at the time of announcement). English and Spanish commentary are available for all matches, and games involving Canadian teams are also available in French. Linear television rights for 2023–2026 are held by Fox Sports in both English and Spanish in the US, and the English-language TSN and French-language RDS in Canada.

Before the Apple TV deal, MLS matches were shown in English on ESPN and Fox Sports, and in Spanish on Univision. MLS's eight-year contracts for U.S. rights for the 2015–2022 seasons earned a combined $105 million annually.

The CFL's current television deal with TSN pays the league at least $50 million per year through 2026. The contract set to take effect in 2027 with TSN and DAZN will pay $83 million per year, in line with inflation compared to the previous agreement. Its American broadcast contract with CBS Sports Network pays $1 million per year for 34 of the league's 81 games; prior to its deal with CBS Sports Network, the CFL had bundled its TSN rights with ESPN (a minority owner of TSN), which contributed a negligible $100,000 to the annual rights fees. The remainder of the CFL's games are carried online in the United States for free.

=== Attendance ===
Major professional sports leagues generally have significantly larger attendance than other sports leagues. The following table shows the average attendance of all professional sports leagues in the United States and Canada that have an average attendance of 15,000 or higher.

League	Teams	Total attendance (millions)	Total games	Average attendance	Games per team	Ref.
MLB	30	71.8	2,430	29,540 (2026)	162	
NHL	32	23.0	1,312	17,542 (2025)	84	
NBA	30	22.3	1,230	18,147 (2025)	82	
NFL	32	18.8	272	69,048 (2025)	17	
MLS	30	11.2	510	21,988 (2025)	34	
CFL	9	1.86	81	22,942 (2025)	18	

=== Franchise valuations ===
Major league franchises are generally worth very large amounts of money, due in large part to high revenues earned by the league's teams. These franchise valuations are reflected in periodic analyses of teams' values, as well as by the expansion fees commanded by the leagues. The highest value franchises in the respective leagues tend to be located in the largest markets (e.g., MLB's New York Yankees, NHL's New York Rangers), whereas the lowest value franchises tend to be in smaller markets (e.g., NFL's Buffalo Bills, NBA's New Orleans Pelicans). In 2025, MLB has the largest multiples between the highest-value and lowest-value teams, with the New York Yankees worth 7 to 8 times as much as the Miami Marlins.

League	Median value	High value	Low value	Expansion fee record	Ref.
NFL	$6.5bn	$13.0bn	$5.25bn	$700m	
NBA	$4.7bn	$11.0bn	$3.5bn	$300m	
MLB	$2.0bn	$8.2bn	$1.05bn	$130m	
NHL	$2.1bn	$4.4bn	$1.3bn	$650m	
MLS	$670m	$1.25bn	$415m	$500m	
CFL				$7m	

Since 2002 expansion franchises have commanded huge entry fees, which represent the price the new team must pay to gain its share of the existing teams' often guaranteed revenue streams. The Houston Texans paid $700 million to join the NFL in 2002. By comparison, the Charlotte Bobcats (now the Hornets) paid $300 million to join the NBA. The Arizona Diamondbacks and Tampa Bay Rays (originally Devil Rays) paid $130 million each to join MLB. The NHL's Seattle Kraken (which started play in 2021), paid $650 million to join the league, a 30% increase from the $500 million paid by the Vegas Golden Knights to join the league in 2017. The Golden Knights' fee was a dramatic increase from the $80 million paid by each of the previous two teams to enter the NHL, the Columbus Blue Jackets and Minnesota Wild. Two of the six most recently announced Major League Soccer expansion teams, 2019 entrant FC Cincinnati and 2020 arrival Nashville SC, each paid a $150 million expansion fee, a significant increase from the $100 million that New York City FC paid to join MLS in 2015. (Note: An identical $150 million fee was paid by the new ownership group of Columbus Crew SC when they purchased the team from Anthony Precourt in 2018. As part of the deal, Precourt received the rights to Austin FC, which started play in 2021.) (Note: Inter Miami CF, announced in January 2018 as a 2020 entry, only paid a $25 million fee. David Beckham, the public face of the ownership group, received an option for a future MLS team at that specified fee as part of his original MLS playing contract in 2007.) The 29th MLS team, ultimately unveiled as 2022 entry Charlotte FC, reportedly paid $325 million. The 30th and most recent expansion team San Diego FC paid $500 million in 2023. For comparison, the Ottawa Redblacks paid C$7 million to join the Canadian Football League. NHL officials have confirmed that when the league next chooses to expand, the expansion fee will be at least $2 billion.

=== Franchise stability ===
League stability
League	Last expansion (size)	Last contraction	Last relocation
NFL	2002 (31→32)	1952	2020
MLB	1998 (28→30)	1903	2025
NBA	2004 (29→30)	1954	2008
NHL	2021 (31→32)	1978	2024
MLS	2025 (29→30)	2014	2006
CFL	2014 (8→9)	2006	1995

All of the top four major leagues exhibit stability in most of their franchises. No team from the top four leagues has collapsed outright since 1954. The last time any of the leagues entered their season with fewer teams than the year before was in 1978, when the NHL's Cleveland Barons merged with the Minnesota North Stars; this was effectively reversed in 1991 when the North Stars were split into the San Jose Sharks and the team that eventually became the Dallas Stars. Excluding this example, the last team in the top four leagues to fold outright was the NBA's original Baltimore Bullets, who folded early in its 1954–55 season. MLB voted in 2001 to contract from 30 teams to 28, but ran into opposition and never executed the contraction plan. Unlike leagues that use a system of promotion and relegation, franchises in these leagues are stable and do not change annually.

Relocation of teams is generally uncommon compared to minor leagues. However, all of the top four major leagues have had at least one franchise relocate to another city since 2004. Among the Big Four leagues, the NFL has had the most relocations occurring recently, relocating three teams over the course of the late 2010s. The NHL is the most recent of the Big Four to expand, having added the Vegas Golden Knights in 2017, the Seattle Kraken in 2021, and the Utah Hockey Club (now the Utah Mammoth) in 2024. None of the other Big Four leagues have added expansion teams since 2004.

In the fifty years between 1903 and 1953, MLB experienced no franchise changes—no new franchises, no franchises ceasing operations, and no franchises moving to different cities—marking the longest such period of stability of any Big Four league.

In contrast to the Big Four leagues, MLS has operated on a policy of continuous expansion since 2005. After bottoming out at 10 teams in 2004, it has never gone more than two seasons without adding one or two expansion teams. As of 2025, MLS tripled in size from its 2004 minimum, with 30 teams. The league has contracted three teams in its history: teams in Miami and Tampa Bay folded in 2002, and the Los Angeles-based Chivas USA squad folded in 2014. MLS has had one franchise relocate, the San Jose Earthquakes, which became Houston Dynamo FC in 2006; the Earthquakes returned as an expansion club in 2008, inheriting the pre-relocation history of the original Earthquakes.

All seven CFL franchises geographically between Vancouver and Toronto have been in place since the BC Lions were founded in 1954. The league has had problems in the two markets east of Toronto; both Montreal and Ottawa have each seen two CFL teams fail since the 1980s, although both cities have active teams as of the 2014 season. The cities are now represented by the Alouettes and Redblacks, respectively. Among existing teams, none has ever formally relocated from one city to another; the Alouettes, however, inherited a management structure from the Baltimore Stallions, a team from the league's unsuccessful 1990s-era South Division. The CFL has had either eight or nine teams in operation since its inception except for the 1994 and 1995 seasons in which the league temporarily expanded into the United States.

=== Number and locations of franchises ===
Franchise locations by population (2025)
League	Largest urban area without team	Smallest urban area with team
NFL	Orlando (3.2m)‡	Green Bay (0.3m)
MLB	Montreal (4.0m)	Milwaukee (1.3m)
NBA	Montreal / Seattle (4.0m)	New Orleans (0.9m)
NHL	Houston (6.8m)	Winnipeg (0.9m)
MLS	Phoenix (4.6m)	Nashville (1.2m)
CFL	Quebec City (0.8m)‡	Regina (0.3m)
‡The NFL and CFL only have teams in the U.S. and Canada, respectively; this list does not count Canadian markets for the NFL nor U.S. markets for the CFL. For the full list of teams, see List of American and Canadian cities by number of major professional sports teams.

Each of the Big Four leagues has at least 30 teams (the NFL has had 32 teams since 2002 and the NHL added its 32nd team in 2021), and each has had at least 30 teams since 2004. Major League Soccer adopted a policy of continuous expansion at a rate of one to two new franchises a year since 2005, and reached 30 teams in 2025 with the addition of San Diego FC. The CFL has nine franchises.

All of the top four major leagues grant territorial exclusivity to their owners, precluding the addition of another team in the same market unless the current team's owners consent, to avoid competition for ticket sales and television rights. Agreements to share are market are generally obtained in exchange for compensation, residual rights, or both. For example, to obtain the consent of the Baltimore Orioles to place an MLB team in Washington (about 35 miles (56 km) away), a deal was struck under the terms of which television and radio broadcast rights to Nationals games are handled by the Orioles franchise.

As of 2025, 50 metropolitan areas (42 in the U.S., eight in Canada) have at least one team in the Big Four leagues. Austin FC, which started play in 2021, is the first and only MLS team in a market not also occupied by at least one Big Four team. The CFL has one team, the Saskatchewan Roughriders, in a market not served by any other major league (the Hamilton Tiger-Cats, while having the city to themselves, are on the outskirts of both the Niagara Frontier (less than 50 miles from Buffalo) and the Greater Toronto and Hamilton Area). The newest market any of the Big Four leagues has entered is the Las Vegas Valley, which received the Vegas Golden Knights in 2017 and the Las Vegas Raiders in 2020.

==== United States ====
Each of the current major leagues has franchises placed nationwide, with multiple franchises in each of the United States' four census regions—Northeast, Midwest, South, and West.

Major leagues tend to place franchises only in the largest, most populated metropolitan areas. Most major league teams are in metropolitan areas having populations of more than 2 million. All but 12 continental U.S. metropolitan areas with a population of more than 1 million host at least one major sports franchise. (Note: The exceptions, in descending order of population, are the Inland Empire of California, Hampton Roads, Providence, Louisville, Richmond, Birmingham, Fresno, Grand Rapids, Hartford, Tucson, Rochester, and Tulsa.) All five U.S.-based major leagues each currently have at least two teams in both the New York/North Jersey area and the Los Angeles/Anaheim market. MLB, which historically (as a result of its history as two rival leagues) had a team in each component league in Boston, Philadelphia, and St. Louis up until the mid-20th century, and in the San Francisco Bay Area until the Athletics moved from Oakland to Sacramento following the 2024 season, still has separate AL and NL teams in Chicago. Twelve American metropolitan areas have a complete set of one or more teams in each of the Big Four leagues; of these, only Detroit does not have an MLS team.

MLB, more than any other major league, focuses its teams in the largest markets. MLB is the only major league that does not have any teams in markets with fewer than 1.75 million people; both it and the NFL have teams in every U.S. market with over 4 million people. The NHL is the major league that least follows the general trend, due to the fact that a disproportionate number of its franchises are in cities with cold winters. The NHL lacks teams in a number of southern metropolitan areas with populations of over 3 million (Atlanta, Houston, Orlando, Phoenix, and San Diego) but has four teams in northern metropolitan areas with fewer than 1.5 million people, all of which are in or adjacent to Canada (the lone American team in a metro area of that size being the Buffalo Sabres, whose territory includes the Canadian Niagara Peninsula, which adds an additional 500,000 people not counted in the U.S. Census Bureau's measurement of the Buffalo metro area). While only one MLB team, the San Diego Padres, is located in a market that has no other major league teams, five NBA teams are located in cities devoid of any additional "Big Four" franchises: the Memphis Grizzlies, Oklahoma City Thunder, Orlando Magic, Portland Trail Blazers, and San Antonio Spurs. A sixth NBA team, the Sacramento Kings, began sharing its market with the former Oakland Athletics in 2025 and will continue to do so until the latter team moves to Las Vegas in 2028. Three of these NBA-only cities (Memphis, Oklahoma City, and San Antonio) and Sacramento also lack an MLS team. The Salt Lake City market, home to the Utah Jazz (as well as MLS team Real Salt Lake), lacked another major-league team before the hockey assets of the Arizona Coyotes were transferred to create the expansion Utah Mammoth for the 2024–25 season.

The NFL has one major exception. The Green Bay Packers survive in major league sports' smallest metropolitan area (330,000 population) thanks to unique nonprofit corporate ownership, proximity to the neighboring Milwaukee market (giving a combined metro area of roughly 1.9 million), a league business model that relies more heavily on equally distributed television revenue that puts small-market teams at less of a disadvantage, and the loyalty of their Cheesehead fan base, whose fans and their next of kin typically renew their season tickets every year until their issue expires, resulting in a centuries-long waiting list for season tickets. Green Bay is one of two NFL teams, the other being the Jacksonville Jaguars, that are the only major league franchises in their metropolitan area.

Both MLB and the NFL have had two prolonged recent exceptions in which the league was absent from one of the ten most populous metropolitan areas in the U.S.; from 1972 to 2004, ninth-place Washington, D.C., had no MLB team, and from 1995 to 2016, second-place Los Angeles had no NFL teams.

The NHL's national footprint is a relatively recent situation. Historically, the league was concentrated in the northeast, with no teams south of New York City or west of Chicago from 1935 until 1967. The league expanded its footprint westward in a 1967 expansion but, other than the unsuccessful Atlanta Flames, avoided the South until making a major expansion into the territory in the 1990s.

Both the NBA and MLS have higher concentrations of teams in the western United States than the other major leagues. Whereas the NBA's teams tend to be somewhat more evenly distributed across the United States, MLS' presence in areas of the southern United States has historically been sparse; after MLS folded its two Florida-based teams after the 2001 season, it did not re-enter the South until Orlando City SC joined the league in 2015, with Atlanta United FC following in 2017. With the addition of Minnesota United FC in 2017 and Inter Miami CF in 2020, along with the departure of the NHL's Arizona Coyotes from Phoenix in 2024, MLS has a team in every market with a complete set of teams in each of the Big Four major leagues except Detroit.

The CFL had a total of six teams in the United States over a three-year period between 1993 and 1995, all in medium-sized markets that lacked an NFL team at the time. Of the seven markets those teams occupied, three (Baltimore, San Antonio, and Sacramento) had other major league franchises at the time, and two later received a major league team (Memphis and Las Vegas). The league also played occasional games in the United States in the 1950s and 1960s.

The largest metropolitan area without a major professional sports franchise depends on the definition of "metropolitan area". Among areas defined by the United States Census Bureau as Metropolitan Statistical Areas (MSAs), California's Inland Empire is the largest without a major franchise. However, it is part of Greater Los Angeles, a region defined by the U.S. Census as a Combined statistical area (CSA), and is thus part of the Los Angeles television market. The largest CSA without a major franchise is the Hampton Roads area of southeastern Virginia, spilling over into a small part of North Carolina. The largest TV market without a major franchise is the Hartford–New Haven market, covering all of Connecticut except the former Fairfield County; (Note: Since 2022, Connecticut's counties no longer serve as statistical entities, having been replaced by the state's planning regions. The territory of Fairfield County has been divided among three planning regions.) Hartford's last major league squad, the NHL's Whalers, left in 1997.

==== Canada ====
The NHL has been the dominant professional sports league in Canada, and was first established in Canada in 1917. The NHL was initially based entirely in eastern Canada. By 1925, Hamilton and Quebec City no longer had NHL teams, while Ottawa left in 1934, by which point American teams were slowly being added. The first Canadian expansion launched in 1970 with a team in Vancouver; the NHL later added teams in Edmonton, Quebec City, and Winnipeg (through absorption of WHA franchises), Calgary (via relocation from Atlanta), and Ottawa (via expansion) to go with the still-extant Toronto and Montreal teams. The distinction ice hockey holds in Canadian culture allowed these franchises to compete with teams in larger cities for some time. However, the teams in Quebec City and Winnipeg were eventually moved to larger media markets in the U.S. The NHL returned to Winnipeg in 2011 with the Atlanta Thrashers relocating to become the current version of the Winnipeg Jets. Excluding the Canadian Football League (CFL), the NHL is the only major league to have teams in Edmonton, Calgary, Winnipeg, or Ottawa, all markets with populations of less than 1.6 million. However, those Canadian cities benefit from the country's very high level of hockey fandom. A 2013 study by Nate Silver estimated that all of these markets had roughly the same numbers of avid hockey fans as U.S. markets with several times their total population. (Note: For example, Silver's study concluded that Edmonton's media market had nearly the same number of avid hockey fans as that of Philadelphia, despite the Philadelphia market having more than four times the population of the Edmonton market.)

In addition to Hamilton, Ontario, and Regina, Saskatchewan, the CFL has teams in all seven current NHL markets. Seven of these nine markets have hosted CFL teams every year since the league's officially listed inception in 1958, and no other Canadian market has ever had a CFL team of its own. A conditional expansion franchise was awarded to the Atlantic Schooners in 1982; it folded before ever playing a game. Another bid for a Schooners franchise by Schooners Sports and Entertainment in the late 2010s also failed.

The first Major League Baseball team in Canada was the Montreal Expos, which began play in 1969. In 2005, they moved to Washington, D.C., and became the Washington Nationals. The Toronto Blue Jays, who began play in 1977, became the first team outside the United States to win the World Series in 1992 and 1993.

The Toronto Huskies were a charter member of the Basketball Association of America in 1946, but that team only lasted one season. The NBA expanded into Canada in 1995 when the Vancouver Grizzlies and Raptors joined the league. The Grizzlies moved to Memphis in 2001.

The first Major League Soccer team in Canada was Toronto FC, which began play in 2007, and became the first team outside the United States to win the MLS Cup in 2017. MLS also has teams in Montreal and Vancouver.

The NFL is the only major league to have no team based in a Canadian city; the closest teams to Canada are the Buffalo Bills and Detroit Lions, both representing cities located on the Canada–U.S border. The Lions play in downtown Detroit, 2 kilometres (1.2 mi) from Windsor, Ontario. The Bills' stadium is located 21 kilometres (13 mi) south of the Canada–U.S. border. From 2008 to 2013, the Bills played eight games in Toronto as part of the Bills Toronto Series, which included one regular season game per year. On August 22, 2019, the Oakland Raiders played the Green Bay Packers in a preseason game at the Winnipeg venue now known as Princess Auto Stadium.

=== Ownership restrictions ===
All four major leagues have strict rules regarding who may own a team, and also place some restrictions on what other sort of activities the owners may engage in. The major leagues generally do not allow anyone to own a stake in more than one franchise, to prevent the perception of being in a conflict of interest. This rule was adopted after several high-profile controversies involving ownership of multiple baseball teams in the 1890s. Additionally, the NHL's "Original Six" period, from 1942 to 1967, was marked by the Norris family owning a controlling stake in half of the league's teams, a factor in the league's stagnation during that period.

With the exception of the NFL, every other major league has had at least one case since 2000 where the league itself has taken ownership or control of a franchise:

- MLB – Purchased the Montreal Expos in 2001 and moved the franchise to Washington, D.C., as the Nationals in 2005 before selling the team to a local group in 2006. MLB also took over the operations of the Los Angeles Dodgers in 2011, citing financial and governance issues stemming from the divorce of the team's co-owners, before Frank McCourt sold the Dodgers to an ownership group in March 2012.
- NHL – Took over the Buffalo Sabres in 2002 after owner John Rigas was arrested for embezzlement, and sold the team to Tom Golisano in 2003. The NHL also seized the Phoenix Coyotes in 2009 to prevent its owner from selling it to a buyer who intended to relocate the team, and sold the team to a Phoenix-area group in 2013. The league again took over the Coyotes and sold them to a new owner in 2024, facilitating the franchise's inactivation and activation of the Utah Mammoth.
- NBA – Purchased the New Orleans Hornets from its owner in December 2010, and sold the team to owner Tom Benson in April 2012.
- MLS – Purchased Chivas USA from Jorge Vergara in 2014 and folded the team after the 2014 season. A new L.A. franchise, Los Angeles FC, began play in 2018 as an expansion team and did not inherit Chivas USA's history.
- CFL – Seized the Ottawa Renegades from owner Bernard Glieberman in 2006, suspended the franchise, then sold it to Jeff Hunt, who reactivated it in 2014 as the Ottawa Redblacks. The CFL also accepted ownership in 2019 of the Montreal Alouettes from owner Robert Wetenhall in order to keep it operating until the league announced Sid Spiegel and Gary Stern as the team's new owners in January 2020. The CFL again assumed ownership of the Alouettes in February 2023 following Spiegel's death, and sold the franchise to Québec businessman Pierre Karl Péladeau the next month.

The NFL (nor any of its predecessors) has not taken over operations of any team since 1962, when the American Football League took over the nearly bankrupt Titans of New York in an effort to prevent the team from folding; in 1963, a new ownership group bought the franchise and it became the New York Jets.

The NFL has stronger ownership restrictions than other leagues. The NFL forbids ownership by groups of over 24 people or publicly traded corporations, except the grandfathered Green Bay Packers. Additionally, the league requires that at least one member of the ownership group hold a 30% interest, with stringent limits on the amount of debt that a new ownership group can take on. The NFL also forbids its owners from owning any other professional American football teams; this rule has not always been in place (as the NFL owners previously owned minor league teams in the 1940s) but was in place by the 1980s, when the DeBartolo family was scrutinized for owning both the San Francisco 49ers and USFL's Pittsburgh Maulers (as different members of the family owned each team, the league allowed the DeBartolos to keep the 49ers). Arena Football League teams playing in the NFL team's home market were exempt from this rule during that league's existence. NFL owners were long prohibited from owning major league baseball, basketball and hockey teams unless they were in the NFL team's home market, or not located in other NFL cities. This last set of restrictions was lifted in October 2018; many owners believed that cross-ownership restrictions had outlived their purpose, and they had largely been disregarded since Stan Kroenke, who purchased the then-St. Louis Rams and moved them to Los Angeles while simultaneously owning assets in Denver, became a majority NFL owner in 2010. Additionally, media reports theorized that the cross-ownership ban materially reduced the sale price of the Carolina Panthers earlier in 2018, with several NBA team owners reportedly interested in bidding but barred by then-current NFL rules. The cross-ownership restrictions originally covered soccer, but a 1982 federal court decision in a lawsuit filed against the NFL by the original NASL went in favor of the NASL, thereby exempting soccer from these restrictions.

MLS has adopted a different league structure and operates as a single-entity league, a structure that survived a lawsuit from the players in Fraser v. Major League Soccer. During the first few years of the league, MLS for the sake of stability allowed individuals to operate multiple teams. MLS ownership arrangements have evolved, however; each of the league's current 30 teams is now controlled by a separate ownership group, and no group member has a stake in more than one team.

Five out of nine clubs in the CFL are held by some form of partnership or corporation; of those, one (Saskatchewan Roughriders) is a publicly held corporation in and of itself, two (Toronto Argonauts and Hamilton Tiger-Cats) are partially owned by public conglomerates, and two (Calgary Stampeders and Ottawa Redblacks) are held by closely held partnerships. Three (BC Lions, Montreal Alouettes, and Edmonton Elks) are held by an individual owner. The ninth team, the Winnipeg Blue Bombers, operates under the shell of the Winnipeg Football Club, a nonprofit sports club with no clear ownership structure or share capital.

=== Challenges from rival leagues ===
All of the majors have bested at least one rival league formed with the intention of being just as "big" as the established league, often by signing away star players and by locating franchises in cities that were already part of the existing league. In many cases, the major leagues have absorbed the most successful franchises from their failing rivals, or merged outright with them.

Baseball's National League withstood three challenges in its first quarter century of existence. The American Association began in 1882 in several lucrative markets without an NL team. For several years, the AA was a viable competitor to the NL, and the NL and AA champions competed in an informal World Series. Four of the AA's teams defected to the NL in its later years, before the AA expired in 1891. Labor problems led to the formation of the Players' League for the 1890 season; it attracted a significant percentage of the baseball talent and caused the NL and AA significant financial harm, but it lacked financial backing and folded after only one season. The minor Western League moved several franchises in NL cities and cities abandoned by the NL for the 1900 and 1901 seasons, and renamed itself the American League in direct competition with the NL. The NL and AL made peace in 1903; the resulting agreement formed what today is known as Major League Baseball. MLB withstood the challenge of the Federal League in 1914. Various Negro leagues peaked from the 1920s to the 1940s, and on barnstorming tours the Negro league players showed themselves to be MLB players' competitive equals, but after Jackie Robinson broke the color barrier in 1947, the influx of black stars into the major leagues drained the Negro leagues of talent. MLB prevented the Continental League from getting off the ground in 1961–62 by placing teams in four of that league's proposed cities by either expansion or relocation.

The NFL has fought off the most rivals throughout the years, and to this day faces a competing start-up league every few years. One strong rival to the NFL was the All-America Football Conference of 1946–1949; three of their seven teams merged with the NFL for the 1950 season, and two of the three still exist in the NFL. Four (all unrelated) rivals were named American Football League; the last American Football League existed from 1960 to 1970, winning the last two of the four pre-merger Super Bowl games, before merging with the NFL in 1970. The NFL has beaten back other significant rival football leagues, often placing expansion or relocation teams in those cities following that league's demise: the World Football League of 1974–1975 (the NFL added two teams in 1975), the United States Football League of 1983–1985 (the NFL relocated one team to a USFL market in 1988), and the Canadian Football League's American franchises of 1993–1995 (the NFL added three teams in the mid-1990s, including one in the CFL's most successful U.S. market). All told, 13 of the NFL's current 32 franchises were absorbed from a rival league—all 10 AFL franchises of the 1960s, two from the AAFC, and one from the 1936 AFL.

The NBA was formed in 1949 after three years of competition between the large-market Basketball Association of America (from which the NBA traces its existence) and the industrial-based National Basketball League. The NBA also had to fend off two incarnations of the American Basketball League, the first being an Eastern circuit that predated the NBA, and the second existing from 1961 to 1963, after Abe Saperstein was repeatedly denied an NBA expansion team. The NBA later fought off the challenge of the American Basketball Association from 1967 to 1976, in part by expanding from nine to eighteen teams. The NBA then absorbed four of the ABA's most successful franchises in a 1976 merger, and adopted several of the ABA's rule variations, most notably the three-point shot.

The NHL began its existence competing with the Western Canada Hockey League and its predecessor, the Pacific Coast Hockey Association; both had folded by 1926, leaving the NHL as the sole major North American hockey league. The NHL fended off two challenges in the 1960s and 1970s. The NHL prevented the Western Hockey League from achieving parity in the quality of players, salaries and attendance by doubling in size from six to twelve teams in 1967, including into the WHL markets of Los Angeles and San Francisco, and added two more teams in 1970, including a former WHL team in Vancouver. During its existence from 1972 to 1979, the World Hockey Association challenged the dominance of the NHL. The WHA initially attracted stars by offering higher salaries than the NHL and successfully invalidating the NHL's reserve clause, forcing NHL teams to keep up. The bidding war brought financial distress to both leagues. With the WHA and several NHL teams faced with collapse, the NHL negotiated a merger of the leagues whereby the four strongest WHA teams joined the NHL.

The CFL has been historically protected from the competing leagues that the NFL faced, in part because of threats of parliamentary legislation to stop any CFL competitor from being allowed to play in Canada. The Canadian Football Act, proposed in 1974 but never passed, would have given the CFL a government-endorsed monopoly on professional gridiron football in Canada by prohibiting any other league from playing its games in the country; the mere introduction of the bill in Parliament prompted the WFL's Toronto Northmen to move to the United States before playing a single game and later the first USFL was discouraged from establishing teams in Canada with the threat to reintroduce the Act in 1982. In the context of the modern North American sports market as a whole, however, CFL has faced and survived numerous challenges from upstart US-based leagues seeking to establish themselves as a second-tier gridiron football league relative to the NFL and thus competing with the CFL for player talent and consumer exposure. The vast majority of these leagues (such as the first and second USFL, second and third UFL, XFL and its later reincarnation, and AAF) have all been short-lived; all but the current UFL have folded, with that league having formed in advance of the 2024 season by the merger of the 2020s incarnations of the USFL and XFL. Similarly, the CFL itself played the role of a competitor to the NFL during its mid-1990s expansion out of Canada and into the US market, which was also short-lived.

=== Fixed league membership ===
In general, sports leagues in the United States and Canada are closed leagues that never developed any system of promotion and relegation like those in Europe. A major professional sports team stays at the top level of the sport, regardless of their performance.

A major factor in this development was the greater distances between cities, with some teams separated by at least half the continent, which in turn resulted in higher traveling costs. When the National League of Professional Base Ball Clubs was established in 1876, its founders judged that in order to prosper, they must make baseball's highest level of competition a "closed shop", with a strict limit on the number of teams, and with each member having exclusive local rights. This guarantee of a place in the league year after year permitted each club owner to monopolize fan bases in their respective exclusive territories and give them the confidence to invest in infrastructure, such as improved ballparks. This in turn guaranteed the revenues needed to support traveling across the continent. With the introduction of TV exposure and other sources of increased revenue during the 20th century, team owners have no incentive to risk giving up this annual income in favor of establishing an "open shop system" where they could be relegated to a lower league that does not generate that kind of lucrative money. There has been discussion of Major League Soccer adopting promotion and relegation, but MLS is not pursuing the option. Eight current MLS teams—Seattle Sounders FC, Portland Timbers, Vancouver Whitecaps FC, CF Montréal, Orlando City SC, Minnesota United FC, FC Cincinnati, and Nashville SC—were promoted from lower leagues through the traditional expansion process, without regard to on-pitch record; instead new teams are brought into MLS based on the financial strength of their ownership and market. Sacramento Republic FC was scheduled to become the ninth such MLS team in 2023 until its lead investor pulled out of the expansion deal.

=== Player development ===
All of the major North American professional sports leagues use a draft system to assign prospective players to teams. The NFL, NHL and NBA all use their respective drafts to ensure a certain measure of parity between franchises, so that teams with losing records pick early in the draft, while the league champions pick last in each round. (In the NFL, the relationship is directly linear, so that the worst team always gets the first overall pick; MLB, the NHL and the NBA, in efforts to thwart tanking, use a draft lottery to determine the early draft order.) Three of the top four major leagues possess sophisticated player development systems.

The vast majority of MLB players are developed through the minor league baseball system. Prospective players generally are drafted, and are then assigned to the appropriate minor league level for development. With the growth of college baseball, more players opt to play at the collegiate level and delay entry into the MLB draft; (Note: Players from the U.S. and its territories, plus Canada, are automatically eligible for the MLB draft upon high school graduation. A player who enrolls in a four-year postsecondary institution becomes ineligible for the draft for three years or until turning 21, whichever is sooner. Players who enroll in two-year institutions (such as US community or junior colleges and Canadian colleges, including CEGEP in Quebec) remain draft-eligible.) college baseball players with professional aspirations will usually also play collegiate summer baseball to gain experience and exposure while maintaining their college eligibility. Individual teams' large scouting staffs have given way to smaller staffs and subscriptions to commercial player scouting services. Entering the majors directly from high school or college is rare, and most of the few that have were quickly reassigned to the minors. MLB clubs also sign many players from Latin American countries, and have also recruited many players from the Japanese leagues.

Most of the NBA's talent comes from college and high school basketball, although minimum age rules have ended the NBA's practice of drafting players directly from high school beginning in 2006. The NBA's developmental league, now known as the G League, was implemented in 2001 by the NBA to perform the role of a farm system in helping with player development and market reach, but NBA teams more frequently recruit talent from overseas professional leagues, mostly in Europe with a few players being recruited from leagues in Latin America, China, and Australia. Prior to the development of the G League, the Continental Basketball Association had served as a minor league to the NBA.

The National Football League is the only one of the four major sports leagues that does not have a formalized farm system. The source for almost all NFL players is college football, but NFL also has International Player Pathway Program for potential international prospects. Drafted players from college immediately join the main team; if they fail to make the regular season roster, a limited number of players may be assigned to the practice squad. NFL teams rarely recruit players from other gridiron football leagues. American football also has the least global reach for prospects, with one exception being several players from other codes of football primarily as kickers and punters. The league's teams backed the World League (later known as NFL Europe) in the 1990s and 2000s, and purchased teams in the Arena Football League for a period in the 2000s. As of 2019, the National Football League Players Association explicitly opposes having an official minor league in the same model as the other major sports, mainly because of the risk of injury. The current version of the United Football League has positioned itself as a de facto minor league and opportunity for players to reach the NFL while asserting its independence as an organization. The NFL does operate two overseas youth academies, one in England at Loughborough University and the other in Australia at A. B. Paterson College.

Each NHL team has an affiliate in North America's top-tier minor hockey league, the American Hockey League, and most have an affiliation with teams in the ECHL. For decades, the traditional route to the NHL has been through junior hockey and the Canadian Hockey League (CHL). Beginning in the 1970s, NHL teams began drafting and signing prospects from Europe, and a growing number of NHL hopefuls are forgoing the CHL in favor of NCAA Division I college hockey. Additionally, USA Hockey also sanctions junior hockey leagues, such as the United States Hockey League and North American Hockey League, that allow players to develop while also retain NCAA eligibility in order to make the NHL. Almost all draft picks are initially assigned to an affiliate in their NHL team's minor league system for development.

MLS teams sign players from their youth academies, from the MLS college draft, and from overseas. MLS teams rely on their youth academies, which are now a requirement for all MLS clubs. MLS clubs can operate youth teams as young as 13–14 years old. Some youth academy teams participate in lower-tier leagues. MLS also holds an annual draft in which top college soccer players are selected. MLS has in the recent past had a formal relationship with the United Soccer League, which operates (among other leagues) the Division II USL Championship (USLC) and Division III USL League One (USL 1). For several years in the 2010s, MLS teams were nominally required to field a reserve team in a USL league, either by direct ownership or affiliation with a separately owned team, although this requirement was never strictly enforced. MLS relaunched its reserve league in 2022 as MLS Next Pro, a third-level league that initially featured 20 MLS reserve teams and one independently owned team (Rochester New York FC, which folded after Next Pro's first season). Of the 30 current MLS teams, all but CF Montréal, D.C. United, and San Diego FC field reserve sides in Next Pro. This setup allows developing MLS players to gain playing experience.

The CFL's draft is limited to Canadian citizens, plus non-citizens who were raised in Canada. In addition to university/college football, the CFL draft also draws players from the long-established Canadian Junior Football League and its component leagues. The league also draws from the same pool of free agents as the NFL, with players who do not make the NFL often going north to seek work in the CFL. The CFL requires free agents to sign contracts, and thus stay in the league, for a minimum of two years. Unique to the CFL is the concept of the negotiation list, which allows CFL teams to unilaterally declare exclusive rights to any given player. Described as an "enduring mystery", the negotiation list forces players to accept the offer they are given, usually at league minimum, with no leverage to negotiate with other teams; there is no order or limits to the negotiation list, and teams can add or remove players to a 45-position negotiation list without their permission and at any time, regardless of age. Starting in 2018, ten of the 45 players had to be publicly announced, and starting in 2025, the league made all negotiation lists public.

=== High player salaries ===
Player salaries
League	Average salary	Team salary cap
MLB	$4.36 mil	$210 mil*
NFL	$2.7 mil	$198.2 mil + $40 million per team in player benefits
NBA	$7.7 mil	$109.14 mil
NHL	$2.78 mil	$81.5 mil
MLS	$0.596 mil	$13.38 mil
CFL	$0.113 mil	$5.70 mil

The average annual salary for players in the four major leagues is about US$2.9 million in 2008, although player salaries can range from $500,000 for backup players to as much as $40 million (up to around $60 mil in the NFL and the NBA by 2021, not counting endorsements and sponsorship deals) for superstars.

NFL, MLB, and NBA have the biggest and longest contracts in the history of professional sports.

NBA players have the highest average player salaries of the four leagues; however, their teams also have the smallest rosters.

The NFL has the highest average team payroll. However, 55-player NFL rosters are far larger than the other three leagues'. Many players on NFL rosters see little actual game play, and teams play far fewer games, making their players on average the lowest paid of the Big Four leagues. After a brief lockout during the 2011 off-season, league owners and the players' union signed a new collective bargaining agreement that imposed a hard salary cap of $120 million in the 2011 season, but temporarily suspended the salary floor, which returned in the 2013 season at 89% of the cap.

MLB is now alone among the major leagues in that it lacks any form of a salary cap and has enacted only modest forms of revenue sharing and luxury taxes. Compared to the other leagues, there is a far greater disparity between MLB payrolls. The New York Yankees had the highest payroll of any American sports team in 2006 when they paid $194 million in players' salaries – nearly twice the NFL salary cap and nearly thirteen times the payroll of the Florida Marlins who spent about $15 million (significantly less than the mandatory minimum team payrolls in the NFL and NHL). In 2025, the average payrolls of the five highest-spending teams, compared to the average of the five lowest-spending teams, reached a multiple of 4.8 — the highest since at least 1985. In that same season, the Los Angeles Dodgers spent $515 million on player payroll, including a record luxury tax payment of $169 million — more than the combined payroll of the six lowest-spending teams. Of the 29 other MLB teams, 16 spent less on player payroll than the Dodgers paid in tax.

For the 2010–11 NHL season, the average player salary was slightly above the pre-lockout level of US$1.8 million. In the same season, the league's salary cap was US$59.4 million per team, with the salary floor set at US$16 million under the cap. For the 2018–19 season, the cap has been set as US$79.5 million, with the floor at US$58.8 million.

MLS has lower average salaries and smaller payrolls than the other leagues. MLS kept a strict rein on player salaries until 2007, when MLS introduced the Designated Player Rule, which allows MLS teams to pay higher wages for star players. David Beckham was the first player signed under this rule. The highest MLS payroll in 2024 was Inter Miami CF with $41.7 million, while CF Montréal spent the lowest at $11.4 million. The league's average salary was $596,226 per year. MLS' minimum player salary will increase from $63,542 to $85,502 for most players.

The CFL has a relatively smaller annual player salary and salary cap compared to the other leagues. The average salary in 2018 is $113,000 and the salary cap in 2018 is CAD $5.2 million. As recently as the 1990s, loopholes in the salary cap allowed CFL teams to pay select marquee players a salary comparable to their NFL counterparts, but financial problems forced the league to close those loopholes. The highest paid player in the CFL as of 2026 is quarterback Chad Kelly, whose contract earns him $1,100,000 per year, the first such contract in the salary cap era to reach seven figures; other starting quarterbacks earn roughly half that amount.

=== Dominance of the sport ===
Each of the top four major leagues are the premier competitions of their respective sport on the world stage. Major League Baseball is increasingly attracting the stars from the Japanese pro leagues, the European pro hockey leagues have become a source of star talent for National Hockey League clubs, and the National Basketball Association frequently attracts talent from professional leagues in Europe, Latin America, Australia and China.

The NHL is the top professional hockey league in the world, and the NHL attracts top players from European leagues. The NHL played exhibition games against European teams in the "NHL Premiere" series (2007–11), the NHL Challenge (2000–10), and the Victoria Cup (2008–09), and NHL teams have won 24 games to the European teams' four.

Major League Soccer is not the premier soccer competition in the world, or even in the Americas, in terms of competition success, revenues, and players. MLS teams compete with top teams from North America, Central America and the Caribbean in the CONCACAF Champions League; before Seattle Sounders FC won in 2022, every edition since the current format was introduced in the 2008–09 season was won by a Mexican club. MLS has annual revenues of 1.2 billion, the Big five European soccer leagues (England, Germany, Spain, Italy, and France) have annual revenues in excess of $1 billion as well. The top players from MLS often move to Europe in search of tougher competition and higher salaries. However, MLS has steadily improved in international stature in recent years. The league implemented the Designated Player Rule in 2007, allowing MLS to attract and retain international stars such as David Beckham. MLS attendance has increased to the point where MLS average attendance is among the top ten soccer leagues worldwide. The introduction of soccer-specific stadiums had improved revenue growth.

In the late 1940s and 1950s, the Canadian Football League (CFL) and the U.S. National Football League (NFL) operated on roughly equal footing financially, with even some U.S.-born star players joining CFL teams. The situation changed along with the rise of the American Football League (AFL) founded in 1959. By the end of the 1960s, revenue from the U.S. television market and absorption of the AFL helped the NFL become much more successful than its Canadian counterpart. By the 1980s, the CFL became virtually unknown outside of Canada. Attempts to promote the CFL included the failed CFL USA experiment in the 1990s. In 2009, a record 6.1 million viewers watched the CFL's annual Grey Cup championship game, while 151.6 million viewers watched the NFL's annual Super Bowl championship game that same year.

==== Use of the phrase "world champions" ====
The perceived lack of competition from the rest of the world has contributed to the long-standing but controversial practice of the North American media referring to the major sports league champions as world champions. Today, the phrase is more popular in the United States but it retains some acceptance in Canada. However, this practice is usually mocked by non-Americans, and the use of the term in the United States is also criticized domestically by some athletes who regularly participate in international competitions, such as the Olympic Games and world championships.

Usage of the phrase in baseball started with organization of championship series between the National League and the earlier American Association in the 1880s, later to be known as the World Series. Major League Baseball later set up the World Baseball Classic, a quadrennial international competition, to crown a world champion among national teams. By the 1950s, the phrase World Champions was also being used by the newly formed NBA. The Super Bowl, the interleague championship between the NFL and American Football League, was explicitly named a "World Championship Game" for its first iteration.

In ice hockey, the Stanley Cup was initially open only to Canadian teams, but in 1914 the Cup's trustees allowed American teams to compete, with the provision that the Stanley Cup winners were to be recognized as World's Champions. The phrase was repeatedly engraved on the Cup, and continued to be used when the NHL began admitting American franchises. When the NHL assumed formal control of the Cup in 1947, the resulting agreement required "that the winners of this trophy shall be the acknowledged World's Professional Hockey Champions" (in contrast to the IIHF's Ice Hockey World Championships, at the time nominally contested by amateurs, although Eastern Bloc nations violated the rules and used de facto professionals). When the World Hockey Association commenced play in the 1970s, they sought to challenge for the Stanley Cup, referring to the 1947 agreement. Both the NHL and the Cup trustees rejected the WHA's challenges; nevertheless, the NHL stopped calling its champions the World Champions, as by this time, the Soviet Championship League was regularly beating the NHL in interleague competitions and the IIHF World Championship was officially opened up to professionals in 1976. Since then, the NHL has called their champions the Stanley Cup Champions.

== History and expansion of major leagues ==
=== United States ===
Professional sports leagues as known today evolved during the decades between the Civil War and World War II, when the railroad was the main means of intercity transportation. As a result, virtually all major league teams were concentrated in the northeastern quarter of the United States, within roughly the radius of a day-long train ride, within the Great Lakes and the Northeast regions. Early professional soccer activity was concentrated almost entirely on an East Coast corridor from Baltimore to Boston, except for the St. Louis metropolitan area.

There were very few major league teams in the far west until after World War II. As travel and settlement patterns changed, so did the geography of professional sports. The NFL attempted to establish traveling teams representing the west and other far-flung regions in 1926 and barnstormed in Los Angeles that season; the experiment did not last beyond that year. The first west coast major-league franchise was the NFL's Los Angeles Rams, who moved from Cleveland in 1946. The same year, the All-America Football Conference began play, with teams in Los Angeles and San Francisco. Baseball extended west in 1958 in the move of the Brooklyn Dodgers and New York Giants. The NBA followed in 1960 with the move of the Minneapolis Lakers to Los Angeles, while the NHL did not have a west coast presence until it expanded in 1967. Almost all of the NHL's initial franchises in the Southern and Western United States were unsuccessful and relocated. From 1982 until 1991, the Kings were the only U.S.-based NHL franchise south of St. Louis and/or west of the Twin Cities. Since then, as newer, fast-growing Sunbelt areas such as Phoenix, Tampa, and Dallas became prominent, the major sports leagues have expanded or franchises have relocated to service these communities.

=== International expansion ===
The Big Four sports leagues have looked to expand their revenues by playing overseas games in attempt to develop a wider international fan base. There has been increasing cooperation between the NBA and the Euroleague. In 2005, the two bodies agreed to organize a summer competition known as the NBA Europe Live Tour featuring four NBA teams and four Euroleague clubs, with the first competition taking place in 2006. The NBA has also played teams from Australia's National Basketball League, and since 2015, the league has played all-star games in the Johannesburg, South Africa, area against squads composed of NBA players who were either born on or whose parents were born on the African continent. The NBA has played regular season games in Japan, the United Kingdom, Mexico, and France, while playing preseason games in many countries around the world.

The NFL has attempted to promote its game worldwide by scheduling selected pre-season games abroad since 1976. The NFL had promoted the game abroad through NFL Europe, but the latter was unprofitable and ceased operations in 2007. The NFL began its International Series, holding at least one regular-season game at Wembley Stadium in London every year since 2007. The NFL held three games at Wembley in the 2014 season. Since then, Twickenham Stadium, the home of English rugby union, has been added as a second London venue. The primary venue for London NFL games has since switched to Tottenham Hotspur Stadium, opened in 2019 by the soccer club of that name. The new stadium hosted two of the four London games in the 2019 season. The original contract between the NFL and The Football Association, owners of Wembley Stadium, expired after the 2020 season, though was renewed for another term. The NFL has a contract with Tottenham Hotspur (aka Spurs) for games through 2027. The Spurs stadium, in which the NFL made a modest investment, is designed to be capable of hosting both forms of football on a single weekend if necessary. NFL regular season games have also been played in Canada, Ireland, Mexico, Germany, Spain, and Brazil.

MLB has played regular season games outside of the United States and Canada, but in the 1990s and 2000s, games were initially limited to Mexico and Japan due to baseball's popularity in both countries. However, in recent years, regular season games have been played in Australia, the United Kingdom, and South Korea with further plans for expansion. Spring training and postseason all star games have also been played in countries like the Dominican Republic, China, and Taiwan. Prior to the Cuban Revolution in 1959, MLB teams had previously played some spring training and exhibition games in Cuba, but the Baltimore Orioles and Tampa Bay Rays would play exhibition games in the country in 1999 and 2016 respectively as part of efforts to improve relations between the two countries.

The NHL has played games overseas as early as 1938 with most games being limited to exhibition games in Western and Central Europe as well as the Nordic countries due to ice hockey's popularity in those countries. As the Cold War came to an end, exhibition games were played in Czechoslovakia and the Soviet Union. During the 1997–98 NHL season, the first regular season games were played overseas in Japan. Since 2007, regular season games have been played in the United Kingdom, Germany, Sweden, Finland, and Czechia. Some preseason games have been played in Latvia, Austria, Switzerland, Slovakia, Russia, China, and Australia.

== Relations between leagues ==
Although they are competitors, at times the "Big Four" leagues also cooperate. Some owners have teams in multiple leagues. In the early years of professional basketball, the American Basketball League, the de facto major league of the 1920s, was backed primarily by NFL owners. There are common business and legal interests; the leagues will often support one another in legal matters since the courts' decisions might establish precedents that affect them all. One recent example was the US Supreme Court decision in 2010 in American Needle, Inc. v. National Football League, in which the NFL (which ultimately lost the case) received amicus curiae briefs from the NBA, NHL, and MLS. The leagues' commissioners occasionally meet in person, most recently in 2009. In addition, the Big Four have also partnered together on community initiatives such as working together in the "Time Out Against Hate" campaign (alongside Major League Soccer, the Women's National Basketball Association, the National Women's Soccer League, and NASCAR) which aims to address and tackle hatred and racism, and the "Love, Your Mind" campaign which encourages fans to take care of their mental health.

The leagues also cooperate in the construction and use of facilities. As of 2026 eleven arenas are shared by NBA and NHL teams, and, in years past, such sharing was common for MLB and NFL teams. Multi-purpose stadiums were built to accommodate multiple sports in the later half of the 20th century; the last multi-purpose stadium in the NFL, what is now Oakland Coliseum, hosted its last NFL game in 2019. Even in situations where separate stadiums have been constructed for each team, the individual stadiums may be constructed adjacent to each other and share parking space and other infrastructure. More recently, MLS teams have used NFL and CFL stadiums as either full-time home fields (much less so now, due to the league's insistence on soccer-specific stadiums) or for special event games; in reverse, in at least one case, an NFL team (the Los Angeles Chargers) used a soccer-specific MLS stadium on a temporary basis from 2017 to 2019 while a larger stadium was built for them. In recent years, two MLS teams have shared stadiums permanently with NFL teams that were explicitly built to host both sports. Seattle Sounders FC share Lumen Field with the Seattle Seahawks; the Seahawks were owned by Paul Allen, also a member of the Sounders ownership group, until his death in 2018. Atlanta United FC shares Mercedes-Benz Stadium with the Atlanta Falcons, with both teams under the ownership of Arthur Blank. Charlotte FC shares Bank of America Stadium with the Carolina Panthers; both teams are owned by David Tepper. In Canada, Vancouver Whitecaps FC shares BC Place with the CFL's BC Lions. The Seattle, Atlanta, and Vancouver stadiums are designed to have reduced seating capacity for most MLS games. Charlotte's stadium was renovated to allow for lower capacity soccer crowds before the MLS team debuted in 2022. Additionally, the New England Revolution shares Gillette Stadium with the New England Patriots, New York City FC shares Yankee Stadium with the New York Yankees MLB team, which also owns part of NYCFC, and Toronto FC shares BMO Field with the CFL's Toronto Argonauts, with both teams now owned by Maple Leaf Sports & Entertainment, the company that also owns the Toronto Raptors and the Toronto Maple Leafs.

Also notable in recent years have been the NHL's Winter Classic and Heritage Classic, which have been held in NFL, CFL, and MLB, as well as college football, stadiums. A unique situation is the TD Place Complex in Ottawa; the same structure serves as the indoor TD Place Arena (which hosted the NHL's Senators in the 1990s), while on the roof of that arena was seating for Frank Clair Stadium (at that time home of the CFL's Ottawa Rough Riders; by 2014 the stadium was renovated into TD Place Stadium and is now home to the CFL's Ottawa Redblacks).

In the early years of the NFL and to a lesser extent the NHL, it was not uncommon for teams to share nicknames with their MLB counterparts. For example, until 1957 New York City played host to baseball and football Giants. MLB's Pittsburgh Pirates shared its nickname with an NFL team (which ultimately became the Pittsburgh Steelers) as well as a now-defunct early NHL team, while the Canadian football team Hamilton Tigers shared a team name with an NHL team. The most recent example of two major teams sharing a franchise name was between 1960 and 1987; when the NFL's Chicago Cardinals relocated to St. Louis, Missouri, it was allowed to keep the Cardinals name despite the established existence of a baseball team of the same name.

In 1997, the NFL loaned $3 million to the CFL after the latter's failed expansion into the United States market in the early 1990s left it in financial danger.

In 2015, the NHL partnered with MLB's digital arm Major League Baseball Advanced Media (MLBAM) to assume the operations of its digital properties; the league's television network NHL Network was also taken over by the staff of MLB Network and re-located to its facilities.

=== Sports equinox ===
As of October 2026 there have been 33 occasions in which all of the Big Four leagues played games on the same day, an occurrence popularly termed a sports equinox. These can only occur in late October or early November, while the MLB postseason is still ongoing after the beginning of the NHL and NBA seasons, on a Sunday, Monday, or Thursday, due to the NFL's scheduling windows. The first sports equinox occurred on October 17, 1971, when the 1971 World Series went to a Game 7, which landed on a Sunday, with a full slate of 12 NFL games, three NHL games and six NBA games. Including that day, ten sports equinoxes occurred between 1971 and 1985, but only one between then and 2009. The phenomenon became a regular occurrence from 2010 onward, and at least annually since 2015. Additionally, during this period, the MLS Cup playoffs are also ongoing; MLS has scheduled playoff games on the day of a sports equinox from 2021 to 2025. The most recent sports equinox took place on October 27, 2025, with two MLS Cup playoff games, Game 3 of the 2025 World Series, a Monday Night Football game in the NFL, 11 NBA games, and two NHL games. The 2026 sports equinox—played on October 26—includes game 3 of the 2026 World Series, nine NBA games, three NHL games, and one NFL Monday Night Football contest but, for the first time since 2020, no MLS contest; instead, Game 5 of the 2026 WNBA Finals will play on the same night, marking the first time since the COVID-shortened 2020 seasons that the WNBA played on the sports equinox. The CFL is near the end of its regular season and beginning the playoffs during this window.

A super sports equinox, where a single city's teams in each league all play on the same day, has occurred only twice: November 4, 2001, in the Phoenix area for the Big Four (which involved the Arizona Diamondbacks at the 2001 World Series, and regular season games involving the Arizona Cardinals, Phoenix Suns, and Phoenix Coyotes) and October 28, 2018, in the Los Angeles area for the Big Four and MLS (which involved the Los Angeles Dodgers at the 2018 World Series, and regular season games for the Anaheim Ducks, Los Angeles Kings, Los Angeles Rams, LA Galaxy, and Los Angeles Clippers). Notably, the Los Angeles super sports equinox is the only one where all teams played at home, as the Coyotes were on the road during the Phoenix super sports equinox in 2001.

== See also ==
=== Major North American sports ===
- Major professional sports teams in the United States and Canada
- List of American and Canadian cities by number of major professional sports teams
- U.S. cities with teams from four major league sports
- List of North American cities by number of major sports championships

=== Other professional North American sports ===
- Professional sports leagues in the United States
- List of professional sports teams in the United States and Canada
- Prominent women's sports leagues in the United States and Canada
- Sports in Canada
- Sports in Mexico
- Sports in the United States

=== International sports ===
- List of professional sports leagues
- List of professional sports leagues by revenue
- List of attendance figures at domestic professional sports leagues – a summary of total and average attendances for the major sports leagues from around the world.
