= List of North American cities by number of major sports championships =

This is a list of cities that field or have fielded teams in the major professional sports leagues in the United States and Canada, showing the number of league championships each city has won. Championships won are grouped by metropolitan areas, not by individual franchises. When a team relocates to a new city, the number of championships won while in the former city remain with that city.

Championships counted are only from the major professional sports leagues in each of six team sports — American football, baseball, basketball, Canadian football, ice hockey, and soccer (association football).

- American football championships include Super Bowl champions (1966–present) as well as pre–Super Bowl era champions: National Football League (1920–1965); All-America Football Conference (1946–1949; three teams merged with the NFL in 1950); and American Football League (1960–1965; agreed to merger in 1966, all teams merged with the NFL in 1970).
- Baseball championships include World Series champions (1903–present).
- Basketball championships include National Basketball Association (1947–present), and American Basketball Association (1968–1976; four teams merged with the NBA for the 1976–77 season).
- Ice hockey championships include Stanley Cup champions (1915–present) since the end of the Challenge Cup era (ended March 1914), and the World Hockey Association (1973–1979; four teams merged with the NHL for the 1979–80 season).
- Soccer (association football) championships include those from the North American Soccer League (1968–1984); its forerunners, the United Soccer Association (1967) and National Professional Soccer League (1967) which merged to form the NASL in 1968; and Major League Soccer (1996–present).

Cities whose teams have not won a championship have been excluded from the ranking unless currently represented in at least one of the six major leagues, in which case their total is listed as zero.

== Metropolitan areas ==
Current through the 113th Grey Cup, completed on November 15, 2026.

Rank	Metro area	Country	MLB	NBA ABA	NFL AAFC AFL	NHL WHA	MLS NASL	CFL	Total
1	New York City	(United States) US	35	5	9	11	6	-	66
2	Toronto	Canada	2	1	-	13	2	26	44
3	Boston	(United States) US	10	18	6	7	0	-	41
4 (tie)	Los Angeles	(United States) US	9	12	3	3	9	-	36
4 (tie)	Montreal	Canada	0	-	-	26	0	10	36
6	Chicago	(United States) US	6	6	11	6	3	-	32
7	San Francisco	(United States) US	7	6	7	0	3	-	23
8	Detroit	(United States) US	4	3	4	11	0	-	22
9	Edmonton	Canada	-	-	-	5	-	15	20
10	Pittsburgh	(United States) US	5	1	6	5	0	-	17
11 (tie)	Hamilton	Canada	-	-	-	0	-	15	15
11 (tie)	Winnipeg	Canada	-	-	-	3	-	12	15
13 (tie)	Ottawa	Canada	-	-	-	4	-	10	14
13 (tie)	Philadelphia	(United States) US	2	3	6	2	1	-	14
13 (tie)	St. Louis	(United States) US	11	1	1	1	0	-	14
16 (tie)	Cleveland	(United States) US	2	1	10	0	0	-	13
16 (tie)	Green Bay	(United States) US	-	-	13	-	-	-	13
16 (tie)	Washington, D.C.	(United States) US	2	1	5	1	4	-	13
19 (tie)	Baltimore	(United States) US	3	1	5	0	0	1	10
19 (tie)	Dallas	(United States) US	1	1	6	1	1	-	10
19 (tie)	Houston	(United States) US	2	2	2	2	2	-	10
19 (tie)	Miami	(United States) US	2	3	2	2	1	-	10
23 (tie)	Calgary	Canada	-	-	-	1	0	8	9
23 (tie)	Kansas City	(United States) US	2	0	4	0	3	-	9
25 (tie)	Denver	(United States) US	0	1	3	3	1	-	8
25 (tie)	Vancouver	Canada	-	0	-	1	1	6	8
27	Minneapolis	(United States) US	2	5	0	0	0	-	7
28 (tie)	Seattle	(United States) US	0	1	2	1	2	-	6
28 (tie)	Tampa Bay	(United States) US	0	-	2	3	1	-	6
30 (tie)	Cincinnati	(United States) US	5	-	0	-	0	-	5
30 (tie)	Regina	Canada	-	-	-	-	-	5	5
30 (tie)	San Antonio	(United States) US	-	5	-	-	0	0	5
33 (tie)	Atlanta	(United States) US	2	0	0	0	2	-	4
33 (tie)	Indianapolis	(United States) US	-	3	1	0	-	-	4
33 (tie)	Milwaukee	(United States) US	2	2	0	-	-	-	4
36 (tie)	Columbus	(United States) US	-	-	0	0	3	-	3
36 (tie)	Kingston	Canada	-	-	-	-	-	3	3
38 (tie)	Buffalo	(United States) US	0	0	2	0	-	-	2
38 (tie)	Canton	(United States) US	-	-	2	-	-	-	2
38 (tie)	Portland	(United States) US	-	1	-	0	1	-	2
38 (tie)	Raleigh	(United States) US	-	0	-	2	-	-	2
38 (tie)	Rochester	(United States) US	-	1	0	-	1	-	2
38 (tie)	Salt Lake City	(United States) US	-	1	-	-	1	-	2
38 (tie)	Sarnia	Canada	-	-	-	-	-	2	2
45 (tie)	Akron	(United States) US	-	-	1	-	-	-	1
45 (tie)	Las Vegas	(United States) US	-	-	0	1	-	0	1
45 (tie)	Louisville	(United States) US	-	1	0	-	-	-	1
45 (tie)	New Orleans	(United States) US	-	0	1	-	-	-	1
45 (tie)	Oklahoma City	(United States) US	-	1	-	-	-	-	1
45 (tie)	Phoenix	(United States) US	1	0	0	0	-	-	1
45 (tie)	Providence	(United States) US	-	0	1	-	-	-	1
45 (tie)	Quebec City	Canada	-	-	-	1	-	-	1
45 (tie)	San Diego	(United States) US	0	0	1	0	0	-	1
45 (tie)	Syracuse	(United States) US	-	1	-	-	-	-	1
45 (tie)	Tulsa	(United States) US	-	-	-	-	1	-	1
45 (tie)	Victoria	Canada	-	-	-	1	-	-	1
NR	Austin	(United States) US	-	-	-	-	0	-	0
NR	Charlotte	(United States) US	-	0	0	-	0	-	0
NR	Jacksonville	(United States) US	-	-	0	-	0	-	0
NR	Memphis	(United States) US	-	0	0	-	0	0	0
NR	Nashville	(United States) US	-	-	0	0	0	-	0
NR	Orlando	(United States) US	-	0	-	-	0	-	0
NR	Sacramento	(United States) US	-	0	-	-	-	0	0
Total			117	88	116	117	49	113	600

== See also ==
- List of U.S. cities by number of professional sports championships
