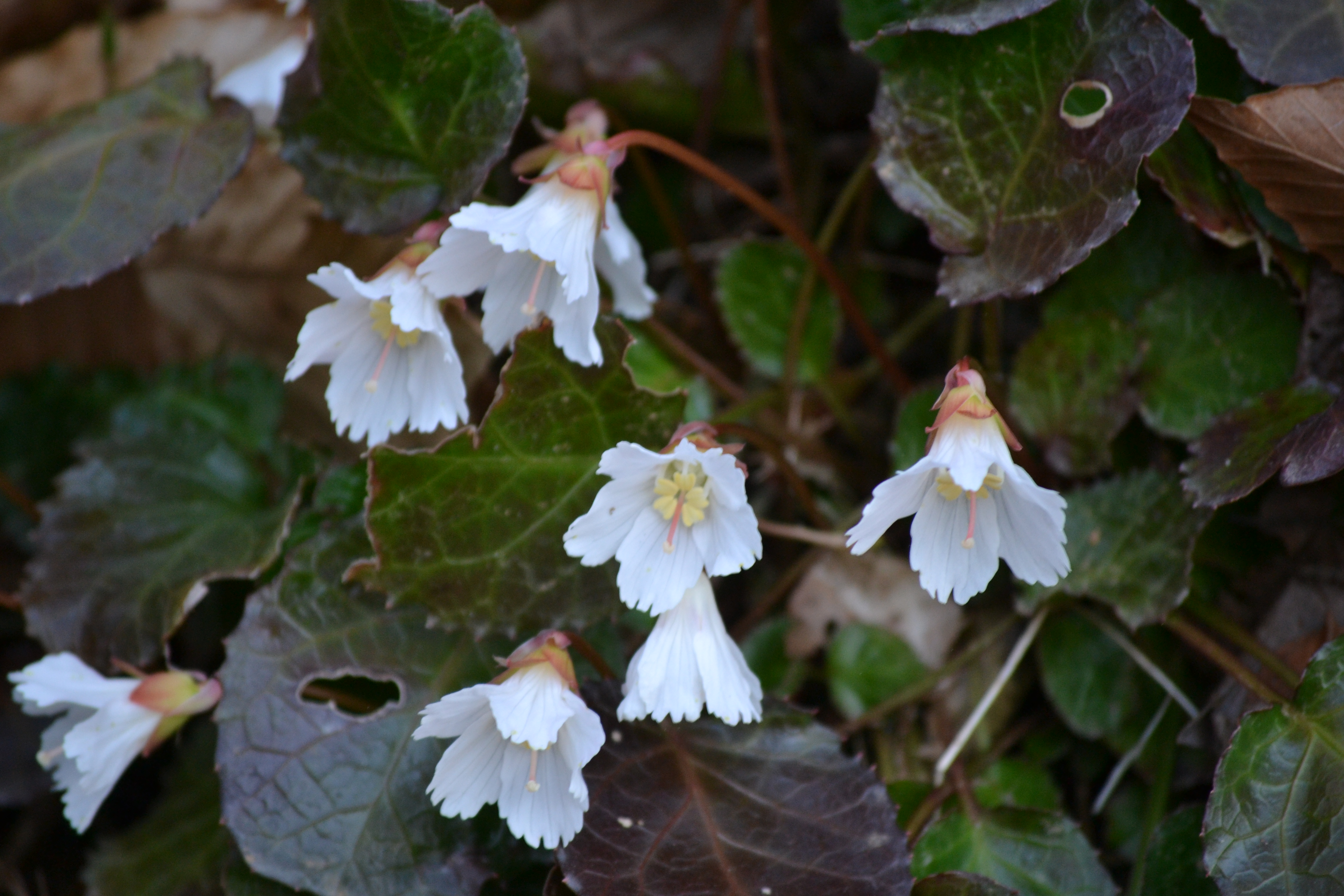

Conservation status
- Vulnerable (NatureServe)

Scientific classification
- Kingdom: Plantae
- Clade: Tracheophytes
- Clade: Angiosperms
- Clade: Eudicots
- Clade: Asterids
- Order: Ericales
- Family: Diapensiaceae
- Genus: Shortia
- Species: S. galacifolia

Binomial name
- Shortia galacifolia Torr. & A.Gray

Varieties
- Shortia galacifolia var. brevistyla Davies; Shortia galacifolia var. galacifolia Torr. & A.Gray

Synonyms
- Sherwoodia galacifolia (Torr. & A.Gray) House

= Shortia galacifolia =

Oconee bells

Species of plant

Shortia galacifolia, the Oconee bell is a rare North American plant in the family Diapensiaceae found in the southern Appalachian Mountains, concentrated in the tri-state border region of Georgia, North Carolina, and South Carolina. Additional populations (some of them naturalized) have been found in Alabama, Tennessee, Virginia, and Massachusetts. Shortia galacifolia has also been reported in Japan, as have three other species of Shortia.

== Description ==
Creamy-white flowers appear from late March to May. Seedlings appear in late July and early August. This is about 6 weeks after the maturation of the capsule.

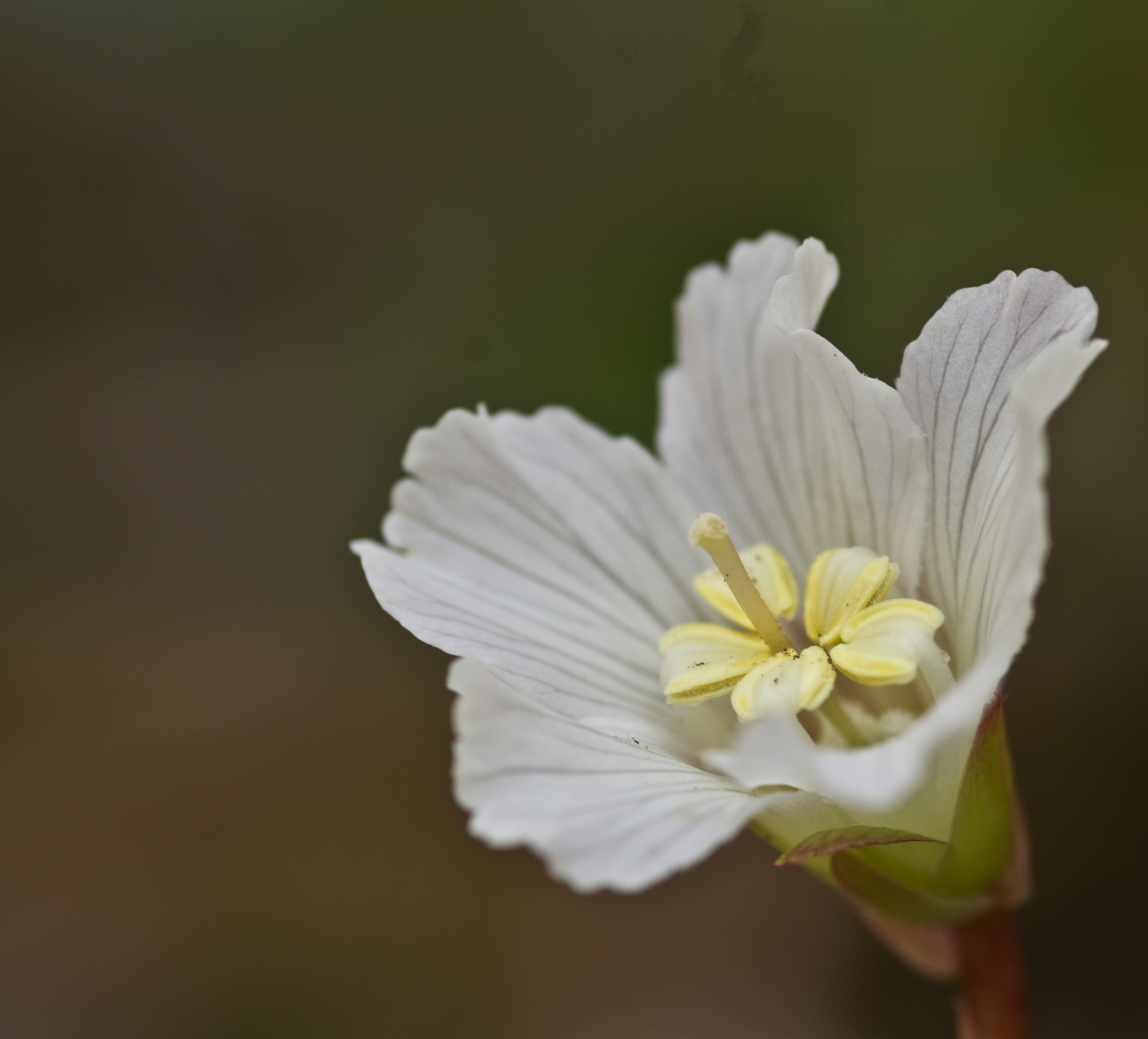
Shortia galacifolia var. galacifolia blossom, ~2cm in diameter.

Stolons have shallow roots. It prefers loamy soil with some sand and/or clay. It prefers areas where the annual rainfall is 140–200 centimeters (55–79 in). Plants can tolerate bright light for only 2–3 hours per day at midday. The leaves have an orbicular shape with wavy edges plus a heart-shaped base. Seeds are slender and oval, with a light to medium brown color. Young plants are usually within 1.5 meters (4.9 ft) of mature plants, but have been found as far away as 6 meters (20 ft). The stalks grow 13–15 centimeters (5–6 in) high and the plants prefer shade and soils with a high humus content.

== Habitat ==
Within its range, S. galacifolia is invariably found along rivers and in gorges where the land is sloping and shows evidence of natural or man-made disturbance: mud slides, erosion, trees knocked down by wind, logging, etc. Shortia galacifolia often forms a dense mat that may prevent seeds of other species from embedding in the soil and germinating. Its decayed vegetative matter may also have a toxic effect on other species. Consequently, it is often found as the only or one of few species of ground cover in a given area. It is found at elevations from 185–625 meters (607–2,051 ft). The pattern of elevation distribution varies widely from one watershed to another.

Tree species and genera commonly associated with S. galacifolia are: Tsuga canadensis (eastern hemlock), Betula lenta (sweet birch), Acer rubrum (red maple), Liriodendron tulipifera (yellow poplar), Liquidambar styraciflua (sweetgum), and Fagus (beech genus). It is less commonly seen with: Quercus prinus (chestnut oak), Quercus alba (white oak), Pinus strobus (eastern white pine), Oxydendrum (sourwood), and Robinia (locust tree). Common understory species include Rhododendron maximum (greater rhododendron) in moister conditions and Kalmia latifolia (mountain laurel) in drier conditions.

More recent species distribution modeling found that suitable habitat for Shortia galacifolia is concentrated in the southern Appalachian region. The species generally favors cool temperatures, high precipitation, and relatively low variation in precipitation throughout the year. Low precipitation during the driest month was identified as an important factor limiting its geographic distribution.

Several factors have made S. galacifolia an endemic relict species. It reproduces successfully only in disturbed areas. Light and soil conditions that are beneficial to S. galacifolia change to its detriment as forest canopy and understory get re-established.

Shortia galacifolia has been successfully cultivated as far north as Grand-Métis, Quebec.

== Conservation ==
Currently, Shortia galacifolia is listed as globally vulnerable to critically imperiled (G2G3) and is listed as critical imperiled (S1) in both North Carolina and Georgia. This could be from the limited range of habitability in the southern Appalachian Mountains which presents challenges for its long-term conservation.

The reproduction systems of Shortia galacifolia have immense effects on the population, growth, and conservation status of the plant due to the different features of reproduction. In 2024, a genetic study of Shortia galacifolia found evidence of both clonal and sexual reproduction, which allows for multiple ways of reproducing, growing, and thriving in changing environments. However, the researchers found that counting individual stems like they had done previously, may not give an accurate estimate of population size and suggested that conservation monitoring should also consider the plant's clonal structure.

== Gray's search for a specimen ==
Shortia galacifolia is a relict evergreen herb which long bewitched Asa Gray, the eminent American botanist, a saga detailed in the paper "Asa Gray and his Quest for Shortia galacifolia". During a month in Paris from mid-March to mid-April 1839, Gray had seen a fragment of the plant in the Paris herbarium, Jardin des Plantes. He had long sought it in the wild in the mountains of North Carolina. Gray's diary entry for April 8, 1839 records him seeing the specimen, which he believed was a new genus. That specimen had been discovered by André Michaux, who identified the place where he found the specimen as "High Mountains of Carolina."

There has been disagreement as to whether Michaux's original collection site was in Transylvania County, North Carolina at the confluence of the Horsepasture and Toxaway rivers, or in Oconee County, South Carolina along the Keowee River at Jocassee. At the time it was thought to be one of the last living specimens of the plant, with fruits but no flowers. Much of the area around Jocassee and the Keowee River was covered by up to 105 meters (344 ft) of water after the Jocassee Dam was completed in 1973. In Michaux's journal for December 8–11, 1788, he says he found the specimen near the headwaters of the Keowee, near where two rivers join together. Prior to the plant's rediscovery, Gray made several unsuccessful trips to this region, the last one in 1876.

A specimen of S. galacifolia was not rediscovered until May 1877 on the banks of the Catawba River in McDowell County, North Carolina by George McQueen Hyams (1861–1932). His father, M. E. Hyams (1819–1891), collected medicinal herbs and sold them to a Baltimore, Maryland drug firm. The Hyams did not know what they had found. Eighteen months later they sent the specimen to lawyer and botanist Joseph Whipple Congdon, who contacted Gray, telling Gray that he felt he had found Shortia.

For the preceding 39 years, Gray had been enraptured by his search for a living example in the field. When a specimen was finally placed in Gray's hand as proof, he exclaimed: "Now let me sing my nunc dimittis." Gray wrote about the rediscovery to his colleague William M. Canby on October 21, 1878. Gray wrote to the elder Hyams, on October 27, 1878, telling him the great news. He noted that because the Hyamses had waited eighteen months before contacting Congdon, they had missed the chance to have their discovery included in a new botanical book published in the meantime. In spring 1879 Gray led an expedition, in which the Hyamses assisted, to the spot where S. galacifolia had been found. Gray's final trip to this region was in 1884.

In Gray's diary entry for April 8, 1839, he named the genus after Charles Wilkins Short, because the plant was native to America in a region close to where Short lived in Kentucky. Short and Gray never met, but they corresponded with one another frequently. Short never saw a live nor dried specimen of his namesake genus. The galacifolia part of the name means "galax-like leaves" because its evergreen leaves are shaped like leaves in the genus Galax. Gray made his first field trip to find a wild specimen from late June to late July 1841. Gray never saw Shortia in its native habitat while it was in bloom. He also never visited the area of the Keowee River. The 2011 U.S. postage stamp honoring Gray also depicts this species.
