= Flowering moss =

Flowering moss is a common name for several plants and may refer to:

- Phlox stolonifera, native to the United States
- Phlox subulata, native to the United States
- Portulaca grandiflora, native to South America
- Pyxidanthera barbulata, native to the United States
- Sagina subulata, native to Europe
