= Creeping phlox =

Creeping phlox is a common name for several plants and may refer to:

- Phlox stolonifera
- Phlox subulata
