= Moss phlox =

Moss phlox is a common name for several plants and may refer to:

- Phlox stolonifera
- Phlox subulata and its many cultivars
