= Pyxidanthera brevifolia =

Scientific classification
- Kingdom: Plantae
- Clade: Tracheophytes
- Clade: Angiosperms
- Clade: Eudicots
- Clade: Asterids
- Order: Ericales
- Family: Diapensiaceae
- Genus: Pyxidanthera
- Species: P. brevifolia

Binomial name
- Pyxidanthera brevifolia Wells

Synonyms
- Pyxidanthera barbulata var. brevifolia (Wells) H.E. Ahles

Species of flowering plant

Pyxidanthera brevifolia, the littleleaf pixiemoss or sandhills pyxie-moss, is a plant species known only from North Carolina and South Carolina. It occurs in deep, sandy soil such as sand hills and sandy ridgetops, sometimes in open pine-oak woodlands, at elevations of 50–200 m (160–660 ft).

Pyxidanthera brevifolia is closely related to the more widespread P. barbulata, and some authors have suggested considering the two as a single species. For the moment, though, Flora of North America and the Kew Gardens Plant List both accept P. brevifolia as a distinct species. The two can be distinguished by the leaves. Leaves of P. brevifolia are shorter than those of P. barbulata, rarely more than 4 millimetres (0.16 in) long. They also lack the marginal cilia characteristic of P. barbulata, and are more intensely woolly on the underside.
