= William Carmichael =

William Carmichael may refer to:

- William Carmichael (solicitor general), Solicitor General for Scotland 1701–09
- William Carmichael (diplomat) (1739–1795), American statesman and diplomat
- William Carmichael (bishop) (1702–1765), Archbishop of Dublin, 1765
- Neil Carmichael (English politician) (William Neil Carmichael)
