= Peyton Short =

Land speculator and politician from Kentucky

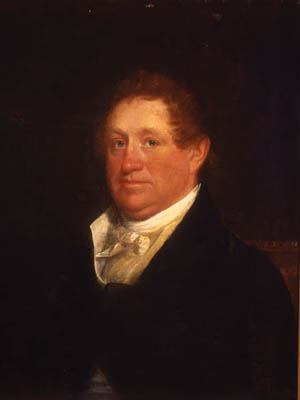

Member of the Kentucky Senate from the At large district
- In office 1792–1796

Personal details
- Born: December 17, 1761 Surry County, Virginia
- Died: September 1, 1825 (aged 63) Christian County, Kentucky
- Spouse(s): Maria Symmes; Jane Churchill
- Relations: Brother of William Short; Son-in-law of John Cleves Symmes
- Children: Charles Wilkins Short
- Education: The College of William and Mary
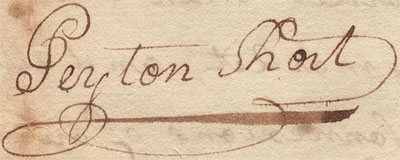
- Signature

Peyton Short (December 17, 1761 – September 1, 1825) was an American land speculator and politician in Kentucky. He was a member of the first Kentucky Senate. He was the brother of William Short; he married Maria Symmes, the daughter of John Cleves Symmes, and was a brother-in-law of future President William Henry Harrison.

== Early life ==
Peyton Short was born December 17, 1761, to William and Elizabeth (Skipwith) Short at Spring Garden, their estate in Surry County, Virginia. He received his early education under the tutelage of his brother William. He followed his brother to The College of William and Mary where he was a member of Phi Beta Kappa Society. The society was struggling to retain membership, and Short was frequently absent from meetings with poor or no excuse given. His attendance improved as his fines for tardiness and absenteeism grew. He graduated from William and Mary in 1780.

Though many sources refer to him as "Major" Peyton Short, no documentation of his rank has been discovered. If the rank was legitimate, it was most likely earned in either the Virginia or Kentucky militia.

Upon his father's death shortly after the American Revolutionary War, Short and his brother William became co-executors of their father's estate. Because of the war's devastation in the area (Yorktown, the site of the last campaign was only dozens of miles away) and a scarcity of money in the family, they defied their father's request to immediately pay off all debts and instead decided to hold the majority of his assets for later investment. Short also accepted a position helping Thomas Jefferson in France and eventually merged much of his brother's inheritance with his own, with no explanation given.

As a young lawyer, Short boarded with a widow in Harrodsburg, Kentucky. While there, he became acquainted with Rachel Donelson Robards, who would eventually become the wife of President Andrew Jackson. At the time, Robards was married to Lewis Robards, the son of the widow with whom Short was boarding. On one occasion, Robards came home to find his wife and Short having a conversation on the porch. He opined that Short was much too attentive to his wife. A heated argument ensued, and though Robards's mother took her daughter-in-law's side, Robards ordered Rachel never to show her face in the house again. Though they briefly reconciled, Robards accused Short of breaking up their marriage.

== Life in Kentucky ==
Short came to Kentucky with future Governor of Kentucky Charles Scott. Rather than cross the wilderness from Virginia, the pair traveled down the Ohio River and landed at the Falls of the Ohio. From there, Short journeyed to Lincoln County, settling in Danville. While there, he was invited to become a member of the Danville Political Club, a debating society that was active in that city from 1786 to 1790.

In 1788, he married Maria Symmes, the daughter of John Cleves Symmes, whom he had met at James Wilkinson's house two years earlier. He moved to Greenfield, his estate in Woodford County about 1790. The couple had three children: Charles, John, and Anna. His son, John married his cousin Betsey Basset Harrison, the daughter of Peyton's brother-in-law, William Henry Harrison . That year, he partnered with Wilkinson in opening a general store.

Short took an active part in the early political and economic life of Kentucky. In 1789, he became the first collector of the port at Louisville. In 1791, he was elected one of the trustees of the city of Lexington, but resigned the post the following year. He was one of the electors chosen to elect the first governor of Kentucky and its first state senators. The other electors chose him to represent Fayette County in the first Kentucky Senate from 1792 to 1796.

In 1793, Short became president of the Transylvania Company (a fund-raising organization for Transylvania Seminary, not the land speculation company). In this capacity, he managed a lottery to raise funds for the school, which was later known as Transylvania University. He also served on the board of trustees for the seminary. He voted in the minority against elevating Harry Toulmin, a Unitarian, to the presidency of the historically Presbyterian institution. Short, Caleb Wallace, and Christopher Greenup resigned their positions on the board in protest.

Short's wife Maria died in 1801 and their three children John, Charles and Anna went to live with his sister Jane Short Wilkins and her husband Charles Wilkins who were unable to have children. About 1803, he married Jane Churchill, widow of Armistead Churchill. Together, they had three daughters, Jane, Elizabeth, and Sarah. Jane Churchill-Short died in 1808 or 1809.

Short engaged in land speculation and incurred severe financial losses. In 1809, he traveled through Mississippi Territory trying to recover his fortune. His brother-in-laws, Charles Wilkins and Frederick Ridgeley, as well as his brother William Short attempted to sort out his dire financial situation but found him contemptuous as well as elusive. Peyton's own attempts were futile, however, and by 1813 the only thing he owned was his own home. Eventually, he had to sell the estate and relocated to Christian County, settling near Hopkinsville. He died September 1, 1825, in Christian County.
