= John Cleves Symmes =

American politician (1742–1814)

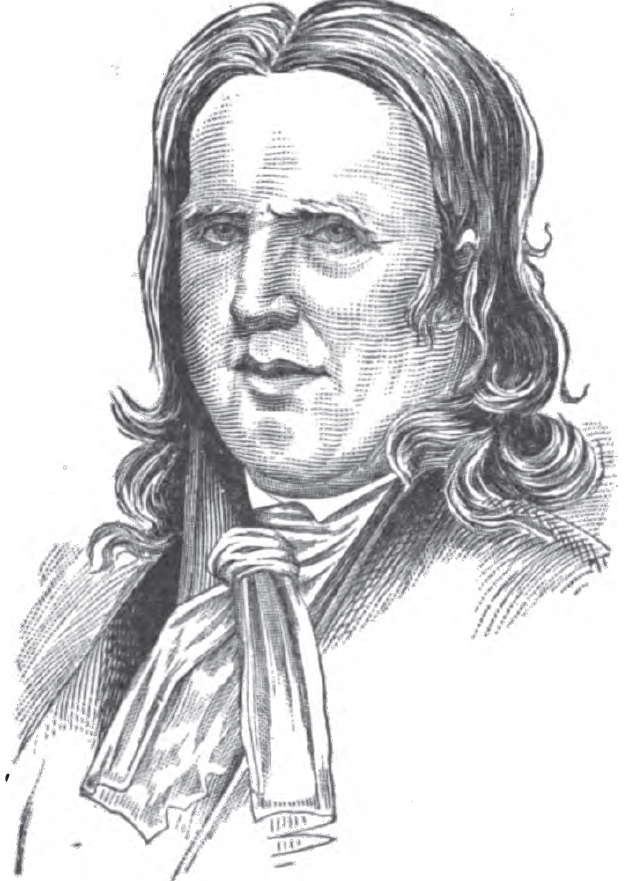
- Sketch of Symmes by Henry Howe
- Born: July 21, 1742; Riverhead, Province of New York, British America
- Died: February 26, 1814 (aged 71); Cincinnati, Ohio, U.S.
- Spouses: Anna Tuthill (m. 1760; died 1776) Susannah Livingston (m. 1794)
- Children: Anna Tuthill Symmes
- Parent(s): Timothy Symmes; Mary Cleves Symmes
- Relatives: John Scott Harrison (grandson); Carter Bassett Harrison (grandson); Charles Wilkins Short (grandson); John Cleves Symmes Jr. (nephew)

Signature
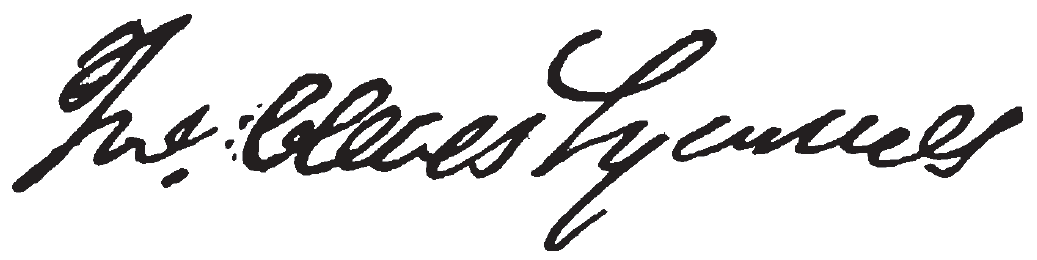

John Cleves Symmes (July 21, 1742 – February 26, 1814) was a delegate to the Continental Congress from New Jersey, and later a pioneer in the Northwest Territory. He was also the father-in-law of President William Henry Harrison and, thereby, the great-grandfather of President Benjamin Harrison.

== Early life ==
He was the son of the Rev. Timothy Symmes (1715–1756) and Mary Cleves (died c. 1746) of Suffolk County on Long Island. John was born in Riverhead in what was then the Province of New York, a part of British America, on July 21, 1742.

Symmes was educated as a lawyer.

== Career ==
Symmes supported the revolution, becoming chairman of the Sussex County, New Jersey Committee of Safety in 1774. When the Revolutionary war began in earnest, he served as Colonel of the 3rd Regiment of the Sussex County militia from 1777 to 1780. The unit was called into service with the Continental Army on several actions.

In 1776, he was elected to the New Jersey Legislative Council (now the New Jersey Senate); he was also a member in 1780. Symmes served on the New Jersey Supreme Court in 1777 and 1778. He was a frequent visitor to Governor William Livingston both in Elizabethtown and in Parsippany.

Symmes represented New Jersey in the Continental Congress (1785–1786), then, in 1788, moved to the west, settling in what later became North Bend, Ohio. He served as a judge of the Territorial Court from 1788 until Ohio became a state in 1803. He also pursued an active career as a land developer and seller.

=== Land development ===
Symmes bought 311,682 acres (1,261.33 km^{2}) from the Congress in 1788. President George Washington signed the patent on October 30, 1794, conveying to Symmes 248,250 acres (1,005 km²) plus a surveying township of 23,040 acres (93 km²), in trust, for an academy. This land was known as the Symmes Purchase, and was the cause of considerable controversy in his lifetime and after. The purchase price was $225,000, and was paid in notes issued by the Congress to raise money during the Revolutionary War. There is no doubt that a considerable part of this amount came from Symmes in the first place as he lent most of his own money to the revolution.

There were other investors who served as partners in the transaction, notably General Dayton and Elias Boudinot. There is also no doubt that some of these notes were purchased from other holders, probably at a discount. This was before the rampant speculation in these notes that happened a few years later, but is still questionable.

There were also disputes about the actual boundaries of the purchase and the quality of surveying and validity of titles. In the last years of his life, he spent a great deal of time in court, defending himself from claims, and died in poverty.

== Personal life ==
Symmes was married to Anna Tuthill (1741–1776) at Mattituck, New York, on October 30, 1760. They had three children at Mattituck, before moving to Morristown sometime around 1770, and another child born at her father's estate Solitude, just outside Morristown (present day Wheatsheaf Farms subdivision off Sussex Avenue in Morris Township). Their children included:

- Maria Symmes (23 April 1765 – 1802), who married Kentucky State Senator Peyton Short (1761–1825).
- Mary Symmes (born August 30, 1767)
- Anna Tuthill Symmes (July 25, 1775 – February 25, 1864), who married William Henry Harrison, who eventually became the President of the United States.

His wife died in 1776 and in 1794, John married Governor Livingston's daughter, Susannah Livingston (1748–1840). Besides being the governor's daughter, she was John Jay's sister-in-law.

Symmes died on February 26, 1814, at Cincinnati, Ohio, and is buried at Congress Green Cemetery in North Bend, Ohio.

=== Legacy ===
John Cleves Symmes is the namesake of the village of Cleves, Ohio. and Symmes Township, in Hamilton County, Ohio. Symmes' nephew and namesake John Cleves Symmes Jr. fought in the War of 1812 and is best known for his Hollow Earth Theory.

Miami University's Symmes Hall was named in his honor in 1949. Symmes Hall is located on East Quad near Erickson Dining Hall on the university's Oxford, Ohio, campus and is currently being used a residence hall for first-year undergraduate students.
