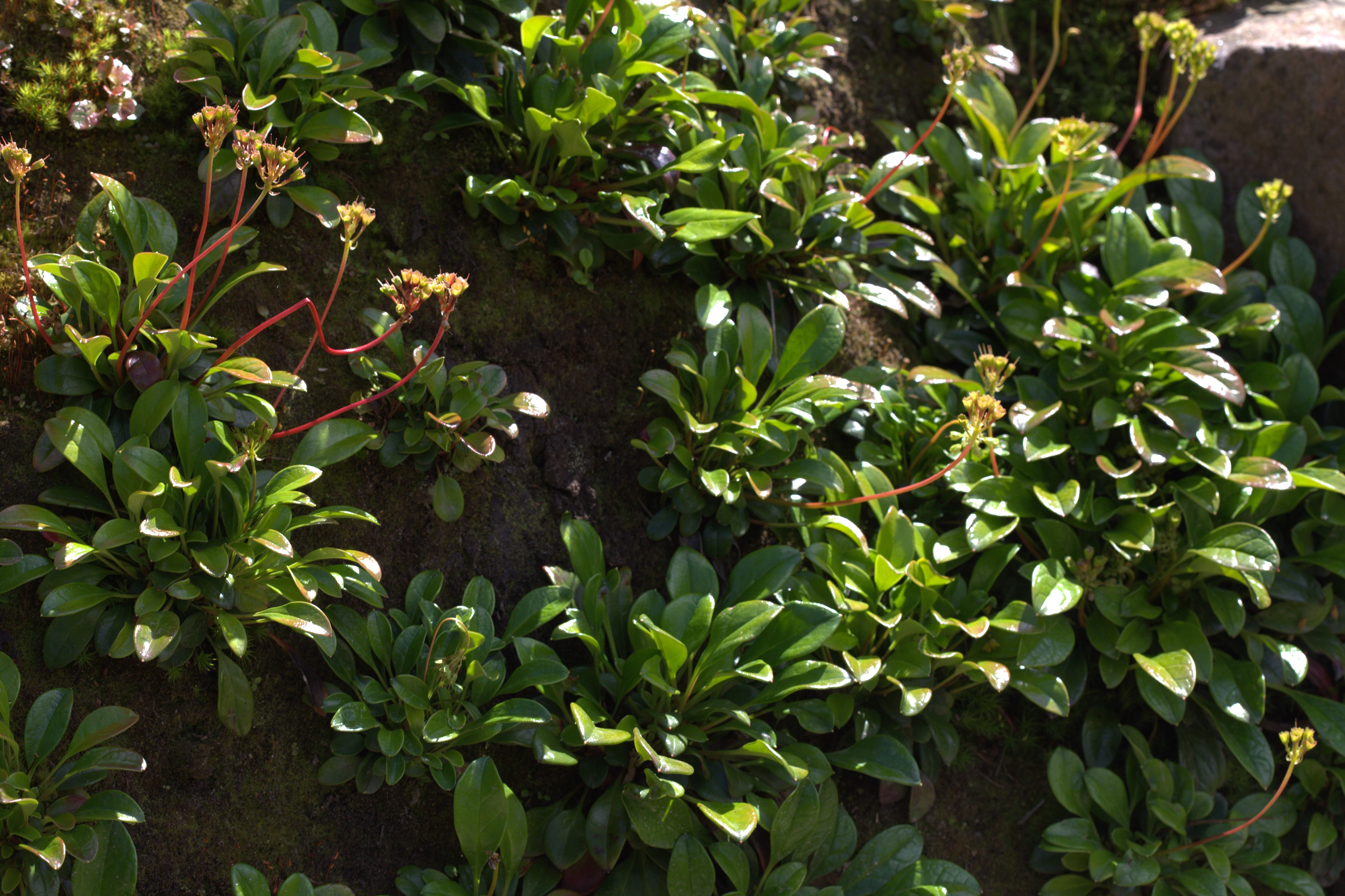
- Berneuxia thibetica at Gothenburg Botanical Garden

Scientific classification
- Kingdom: Plantae
- Clade: Tracheophytes
- Clade: Angiosperms
- Clade: Eudicots
- Clade: Asterids
- Order: Ericales
- Family: Diapensiaceae
- Genus: Berneuxia; Decne.
- Species: B. thibetica

Binomial name
- Berneuxia thibetica Decne.

= Berneuxia =

Genus of flowering plants

Berneuxia is a genus of flowering plants in the family Diapensiaceae. There is only one accepted species, Berneuxia thibetica, native to southeastern Tibet, the eastern Himalaya, Myanmar and south central China.
