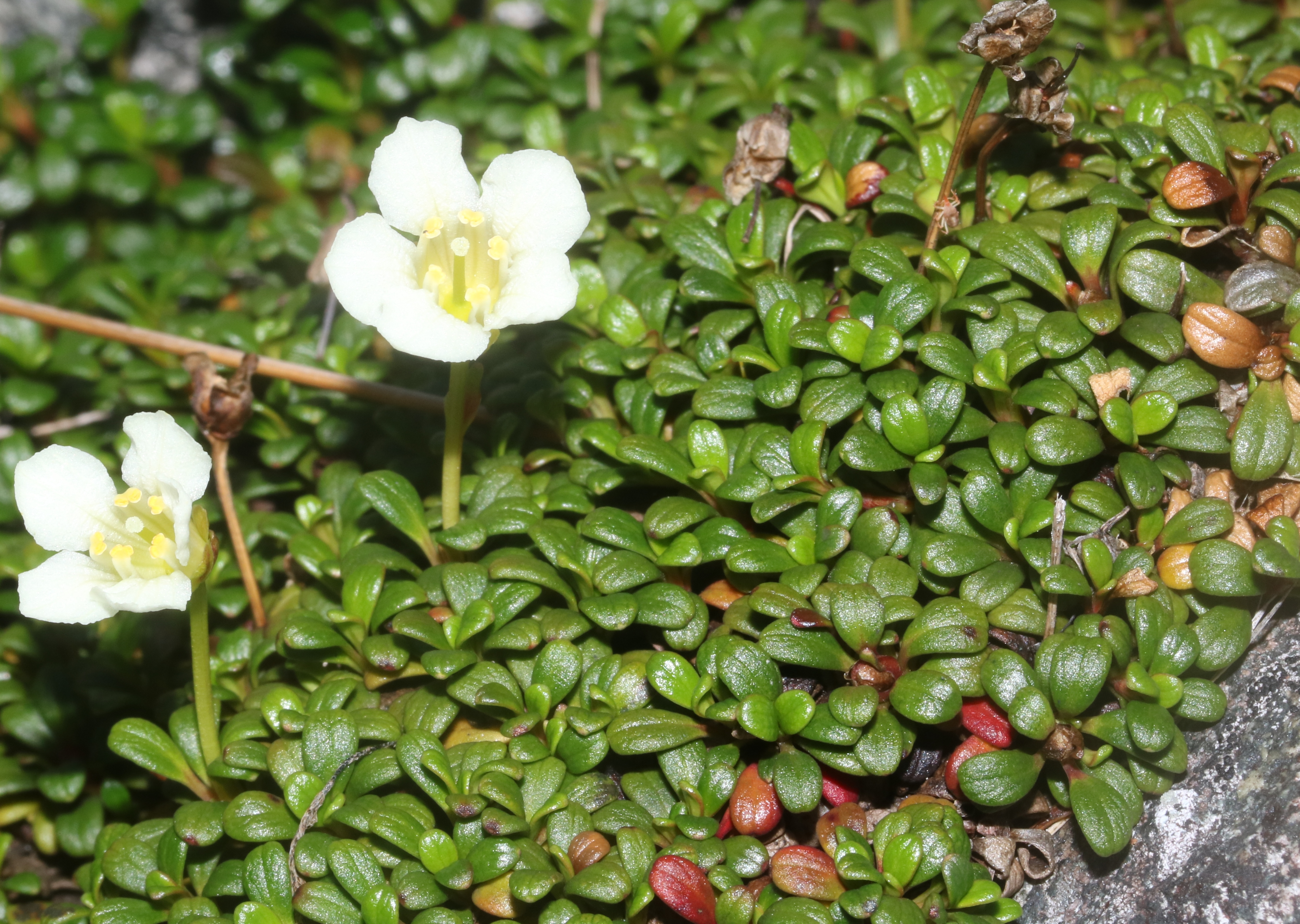
- Diapensia lapponica subsp. obovata in Japan

Scientific classification
- Kingdom: Plantae
- Clade: Tracheophytes
- Clade: Angiosperms
- Clade: Eudicots
- Clade: Asterids
- Order: Ericales
- Family: Diapensiaceae
- Genus: Diapensia
- Species: D. lapponica

Binomial name
- Diapensia lapponica L.

Subspecies
- D. l. subsp. lapponica; D. l. subsp. obovata

= Diapensia lapponica =

Species of flowering plant

Diapensia lapponica, the pincushion plant, is a plant in the family Diapensiaceae, the only circumboreal species in the genus Diapensia, the others being mainly in the Himalaya and on mountains in southwestern China. This species likely became circumboreal-circumpolar [Arctic–alpine] after it jumped to arctic habitat from North China and Russia. The most likely candidate for ancestor is a white-flowered D. purpurea The plants grow on exposed rocky ridges that are kept free from snow by high winds. Diapensia lapponica is extremely slow and low-growing and cannot compete with plants that overtop it. The plant is very sensitive to higher temperatures and so is often in misty foggy habitat. It usually dies when transplanted to lowland gardens and so this is not recommended. Cold-treated or wild and winter-collected seed will germinate indoors. The seed and leaves are high in lipids.

It is a small cushion-forming evergreen perennial shrub, up to 15 centimetres (6 in) in height, and can trap heat in the dome. It has oval blunt leathery toothless leaves, up to 1 cm (0.4 in) long, which are arranged in dense rosettes. It bears solitary white flowers (rarely pink), on stems up to 3 cm (1.2 in) tall.

It could be aged by counting growth-rings or clump diameter, and on this basis, many Canadian plants are thought to live to over a century or two.

In places such as Newfoundland two blooming periods exist on different plants: early June and (more frequently) August. It is not known if this is a genetic or environmental affect. Two blooming periods are known for other plants. It often involves flower buds being formed in the present or previous year (overwintering buds).

== Subspecies ==
- Diapensia lapponica subsp. lapponica in eastern North America, Greenland, Iceland, Scotland, Scandinavia, and western Arctic Russia. It forms tussocks and its leaves are oblong‑oblanceolate to narrowly spatulate.
- Diapensia lapponica subsp. obovata in eastern Arctic Russia, Korea, Japan, Alaska and the Yukon. It forms mats because its branches can root adventitiously, and its leaf blades are obovate to spatulate‑elliptic.

The ranges of these two subspecies do not meet in north central Canada, and possibly not in central Siberia, so they are believed to be dispersing east and west from different glacial refugia.

== Etymology ==
The name Diapensia lapponica was given by Linnaeus to designate a flower found in Lapland (Lapponia > adj. lapponicus), where he traveled early in his career. Linnaeus's book about the flora of Lapland has been called "the first proto-modern flora". However, sources disagree on how Linnaeus might have derived the genus name, Diapensia. Gray states that the term was derived from the ancient Greek name of the sanicle, a very different looking flower, and opined that the term was "of obscure meaning [and] strangely applied . . . to this boreal plant." Webster's also reflects uncertainty stating the term is "New Latin, perhaps irregular from Greek dia pente by fives + New Latin -ia; from the five-leaved calyx", a description that would apply to thousands of flowering plants. The Encyclopaedia Londinensis of John Wilkes suggested that term is from Greek,"deeply grieving or mourning; probably from its situation".

== Status in Britain ==
In Britain, Diapensia is found only at a single site near Glenfinnan in Lochaber, the species' most southerly site in Europe. Here, the species occurs on acidic soil among stones on the ridge between the summit of Sgùrr an Utha and the adjoining hill called Fraoch-bheinn, at 760–780 metres (2,490–2,560 ft) above sea-level. Its total extent at this site is less than 5,000 square metres (1.2 acres). A total of 1,200 clumps or mats have been counted, and monitoring since 1980 has not detected any change in this population.

The discovery of Diapensia took place in July 1951; C. F. Tebbutt, a birdwatcher, found the plant, recognising it as "something different". Diapensia was one of a trio of Arctic plants discovered in Scotland in the early 1950s. Although no new species to Britain had been discovered in Scotland since Victorian times, in 1950, the Arctic plant Koenigia islandica had been found on the Isle of Skye, and in 1952, Artemisia norvegica was found on Cùl Mòr. A photograph of the plant by Robert Moyes Adam taken on 14 June 1952 (soon after the initial discovery) is held by the St Andrews University Library.

It flowers at this site in May or June, the exact time varying from year to year. Some sources state that the species is found at a second site, but recent sources state that this is not the case.

The plant is listed in the 3rd edition of the British vascular plant Red Data Book as vulnerable. It is also protected under Schedule 8 of the Wildlife and Countryside Act 1981.
