= William Short (American ambassador) =

American diplomat (1759–1849)

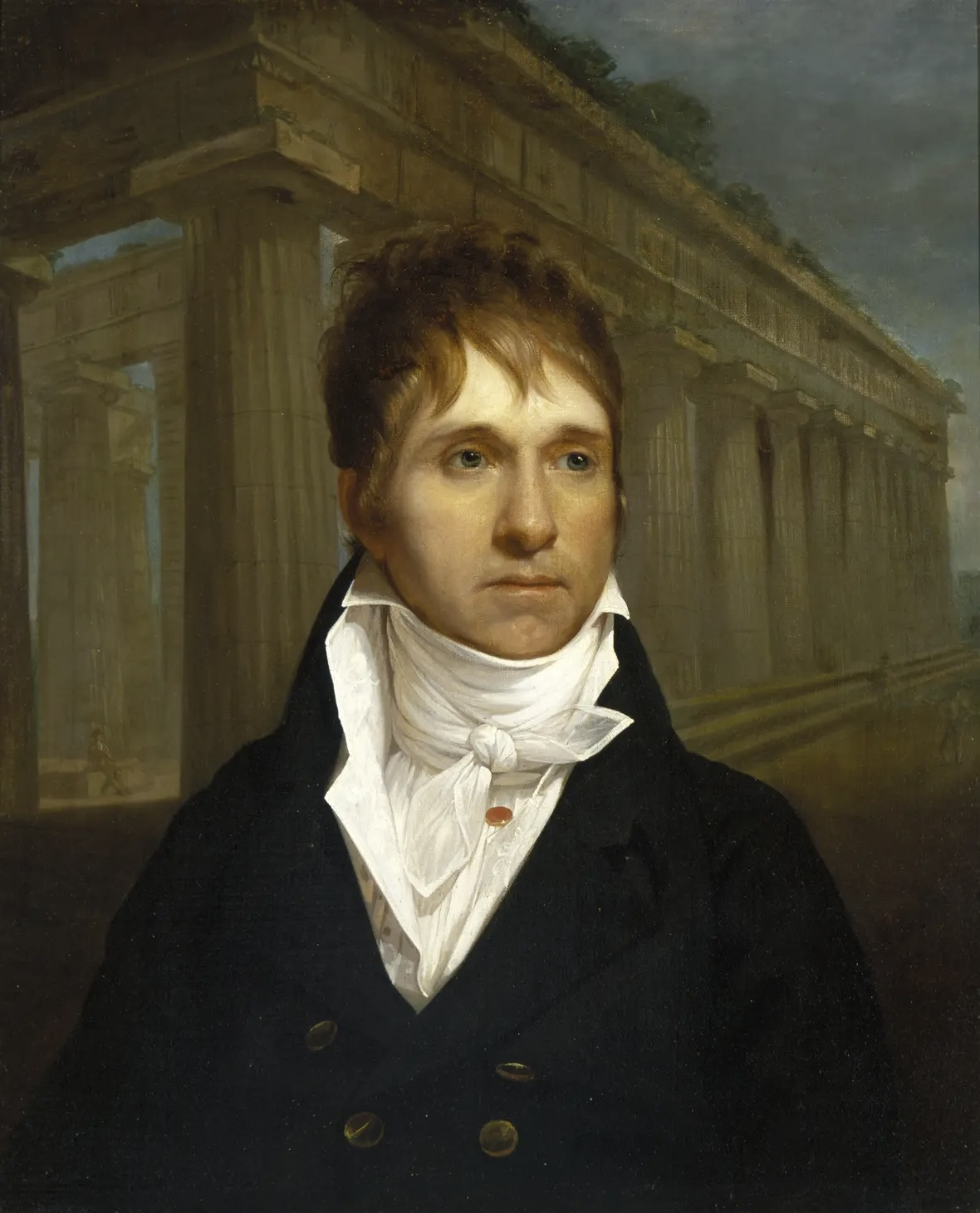
- Portrait by Rembrandt Peale, c. 1806

1st United States Minister to Spain
- In office September 7, 1794 – November 1, 1795
- President: George Washington
- Preceded by: Position established
- Succeeded by: David Humphreys

2nd United States Minister to the Netherlands
- In office June 18, 1792 – December 19, 1792
- President: George Washington
- Preceded by: John Adams
- Succeeded by: John Quincy Adams

3rd United States Minister to France
- In office June 14, 1790 – May 15, 1792
- President: George Washington
- Preceded by: Thomas Jefferson
- Succeeded by: Gouverneur Morris

Personal details
- Born: September 30, 1759 Surry County, Virginia, United States
- Died: December 5, 1849 (aged 90) Philadelphia, Pennsylvania
- Resting place: Laurel Hill Cemetery, Philadelphia, Pennsylvania, U.S.
- Relatives: Peyton Short, brother
- Education: College of William & Mary

William Short (September 30, 1759 – December 5, 1849), a Virginia-born lawyer who disagreed with slavery, became an American diplomat during the first two decades of his country's existence before moving to Philadelphia and becoming a successful financier and philanthropist. Thomas Jefferson, later the third President of the United States, was a lifelong mentor and friend. In a 1789 letter, Jefferson referred to Short as his "adoptive son," Short served as Jefferson's private secretary when the latter was a peace commissioner in France, and remained in Europe to take on several other diplomatic posts, including as the U.S.'s chargé d'affaires in France during the French Revolution (1789–92), America's fiscal agent in Europe (1790-1794), as America's Minister to the Netherlands (1792), as a treaty commissioner to Spain (1794 to 1795), and had a recess appointment as Ambassador to Russia in 1808 but never physically assumed the post.

Although Short's diplomatic career was not as celebrated or long as Short may have wished, and his love affair with a French noblewoman ended with her marrying another man, Short was a successful businessman and an opponent of slavery who died very wealthy in America.

== Early life and education ==
William Short was born in 1759 to William Short (the Fifth) and Elizabeth Skipwith in Surry County near Spring Grove. His slightly younger brother Peyton Short became a land speculator and politician in Kentucky. They also had two sisters who married and had children. He could trace his descent to William Short who emigrated to the colony as a servant indentured to William Peirce, a member of the colony's council who settled on the south side of the James River across from Jamestown (the colony's first capital and relatively close to Williamsburg, the capital in this man's childhood). That ancestor married and accumulated money as a hired hand before buying land near the head of Chippokes Creek in 1653 and owned more than 1100 acres of land two years before his death, creating a plantation he called Spring Garden. Successive generations accumulated more land and eventually enslaved servants and social position, so that the third William Short owned 2,270 acres (half of them in Surry County), as well as a house with at least three bedrooms, two stills, a schooner and grist mill. The appraisal of his estate listed 40 slaves, 9 horses, 145 cattle, 186 swine and 25 sheep. The fourth Williamm Short had risen to become a church warden of Southwark parish, and bequeathed to the fifth generation William Short (this man's father) 850 acres in Surry as well as 1000 acres in Halifax County, North Carolina, the grist mill, warehouse and store, 20 slaves, 718 cattle, 11 horses, 87 sheep and 184 hogs. Short's aunt Martha (b.1735) had married Rev. Robert Reade (d. circa 1787), a graduate, of the College of William and Mary who served at St. Johns parish in King William County. Other sisters married into the prominent Cocke and Poythress families. Father William Short V also supplied food and uniforms as well as provided transport and storage for General von Steuben's training camp in nearby Cabin Point during the American Revolutionary War. In 1778, upon the death of the previous Major of the county militia, he had accepted that position, and helped defend the county from Benedict Arnold's raiding parties in 1781.

This sixth William Short was probably christened at the Cabin point chapel by the Rev. Peter Davis, and taught by the next rector, Benjamin Blagrove. His maternal grandfather, Sir William Skipwith recommended that Short continue his studies at Petersburg in the school operated by the Rev. William Harrison, although no reminiscences exist of his schooling, other than he remembered seeing a buffalo while a student there.

As the American Revolution began, Short crossed the James River to study at the College of William & Mary in Williamsburg, Virginia. In April 1777, he became the 11th member of the fledgling Phi Beta Kappa society, and the next year became its second president. He served for two years and n December 1779 allowed the formation of another chapter in Cambridge, Massachusetts. Through Phi Beta Kappa or his Surry social connections, he also knew John Hartwell Cocke Sr., whose son, future Gen. John Hartwall Cocke much later became a correspondent about internal improvements. Short was probably a member of the Flat Hat Society reorganized by his friend William Nelson Jr. in 1779, and had become a member of the Williamsburg lodge of the Masonic order by 1781. Though his primary studies were in "moral philosophy" (which in that era included economics, history political science and sociology), Short also studied law with George Wythe beginning in 1780, in the same class as his friend William Nelson Jr. as well as future Chief Justice John Marshall (who graduated before them).

Short had joined the student militia when it formed in 1777, but unlike Nelson, Cocke and his life long friend James Monroe, did not become an officer. Three years earlier as the war began he had not joined Theodorick Bland Jr, Monroe and others in removing arms from the Governor's palace as Lord Dunmore left Wiliamsburg. Students drilled in Williamsburg, as well as helped defend Hampton against British raiders in 1779. During the final Yorktown campaign in 1781, a quarter were called out to protect the peninsula between the James and York Rivers, and sick and wounded soldiers were quartered in college buildings. Forty years later Short recalled that even after the successful end of the campaign, the college's exercises could not be resumed. In 1804, Short was elected a member of the American Philosophical Society.

== Lawyer, planter and politician ==
Governor Jefferson and Professor Wythe were among the five examiners who deemed Short fit to practice law in 1782. At the time, he possessed a manservant named Stephen, as well as a thousand acres of land in North Carolina, several hundred wooded or swampy acres in Surry, and little cash. Short visited Monticello several times in the spring of 1782, in part because he was related to Martha Wayles Jefferson (her half sister Tabitha had married his uncle Henry Skipwith). Short helped Jefferson resolve the claims of the Skelton family to John Wayles' estate, as well as assumed the guardianship of Jefferson's underage nephew Peter Carr (the son of Dabney Carr and Jefferson's sister Martha). Short soon traveled to Richmond, where he began his legal career, which was placed on hold circa 1783 because of the difficulties involved in settling the debts of his father's estate, as well as his new duties related to Virginia's Executive Council. With Jefferson's support, Short was elected to a vacancy on the Executive Council on June 6, 1783, then to a full year-long term on November 27, 1783.

== Diplomatic career ==
During his time in Paris as Thomas Jefferson's private secretary, William Short served as charge d'affaires in Jefferson's absence. Short's appointment to this role was President Washington's first appointment under the new Constitution, and thus Short holds the honor of being the first Presidential nominee in U.S. history. After Jefferson returned to America in 1789, Short continued as charge d'affairs, and since he was the highest ranking American diplomat in France he essentially served as the replacement U.S. Minister for three years. During this time, in what would become a lifelong correspondence, Short provided Jefferson with detailed reports on the progress of the French Revolution. After 1792, Short became increasingly disillusioned with the excessive violence of the Revolution, which resulted in several friends being arrested or murdered.

From September 1790 until August 1794, Short also acted as the United States's fiscal agent in Europe, and in that capacity he refinanced America's foreign debt, negotiating a lower interest rate than any other country enjoyed—a service that greatly helped America's federal government in the 1790s. He was appointed Minister Resident to the Netherlands in January 1792 and served until December 1792. From 1794 to 1795 he was a treaty commissioner plenipotentiary to Spain. Short's Spanish mission was frustrating, however, because France and Spain went to war in March 1793, making any Spanish-American treaty much more difficult. After working on negotiations for years, he was removed from his position just as the situation began to get better, and so did not get credit when a treaty was finally made. Short returned to Paris, but after finding that the woman he loved, the Duchesse Rosalie de la Rochefoucauld, was not willing to leave France, he went back to the United States to take care of business matters in 1802. Immediately upon returning, Short visited Jefferson for a month at Monticello, Jefferson's home.

A few years later, then-President Jefferson nominated Short via recess appointment to become Minister to Russia in 1808; however, after Short had arrived in Europe, the Senate decided not to have a diplomat sent to Russia at all, and Short never proceeded to the post. Short became angry at James Madison, who had succeeded Jefferson to the presidency, for not renewing his appointment and for sending John Quincy Adams instead in 1809. Short also found out that Rosalie not only would not leave France to marry him, but had actually married an older, wealthy relative instead. Short left Europe for good, returning to America and spending the last years of his life managing his successful business dealings, supporting various philanthropic ventures, and keeping up his friendship with Jefferson through visits and letters.

== Financier ==
Short had invested in the James River and Kanawha Canal Company in 1795, and sold those shares at a profit decades later. Upon returning to the United States, he invested in some new technologies, including railroads (which he foresaw would supersede canals), steamboats and land in upstate New York.

== Abolitionist and American Colonization Society ==
Short was both an opponent of slavery and a believer in the natural equality of the races. In 1798, he wrote that further research into the societies of Africa were giving evidence that black people were capable of great civilizations, and—he hoped—news of this would undermine the racial prejudices many white people in America held toward black people. He advocated freeing slaves in America, giving them farmland and access to education, and supported racial intermarriage. Later in his life, he became a supporter of the American Colonization Society, believing that slaveowners would be encouraged by it to free their slaves.

== Personal life ==
=== Love letters and romance with Rosalie de la Rochefoucauld ===
Short never acquired the fame or political prestige he sought in life, despite his charm and intellect, his diplomatic assignments in Europe, or his close relationship with Thomas Jefferson, whom he considered a second father. But Short developed a romance with Alexandrine Charlotte de Rohan-Chabot, informally known as Rosalie, the Duchess de la Rochefoucauld. She was an aristocrat during the French Revolution. She witnessed firsthand the violence during the Reign of Terror, including the assassination of her husband and the execution of her brother. Their love affair was recorded in hundreds of letters which detailed these events, documenting the lovers' pains of separation and their frustration with social norms. Their words of poetic devotion offer personal insights into a turbulent era of world history. Despite their romance, she eventually married a kinsman, Boniface Louis Andre, Marquis de Castellane, in 1810.

== Death and legacy ==
Short died in Philadelphia in December 1849, and was buried at historic Laurel Hill Cemetery. The Short family home, "Spring Garden" was sold after the death of William Short V in 1782 (his wife Elizabeth Skipwith having died in 1771) and by 1833 was owned by Francis Ruffin, who consolidated it and adjoining tracts and called his plantation "Broomfield".

The Library of Congress holds the extensive Short family papers in its Manuscripts Division, and the University of Virginia Library holds the papers of his major biographers, Peter Thompson former Associate Professor at the University of Oxford and George Green Shackelford. The Center for Digital Editing and the Institute for Southern Studies at the University of South Carolina are working with the Université Paris Est-Créteil to make 3000 of his papers available digitally (as well as calendar another 8000 papers held by other institutions).

== In popular culture ==
In the historical novel America's First Daughter, Short is a major character. The authors imagine him as having a lifelong unfulfilled romance with Jefferson's daughter Patsy. This thesis is explored Peter Thompson's, Heir through Hope: Thomas Jefferson's Lifelong Investment in William Short (Oxford University Press, 2023)

Diplomatic posts
Preceded by Thomas Jefferson	U.S. Minister to France; 1790–1792	Succeeded by Gouverneur Morris
Preceded by Charles W.F. Dumas	U.S. Minister to the Netherlands; 1792–1792	Succeeded by John Quincy Adams
Preceded by William Carmichael	U.S. Minister to Spain; 1794–1795	Succeeded by David Humphreys
