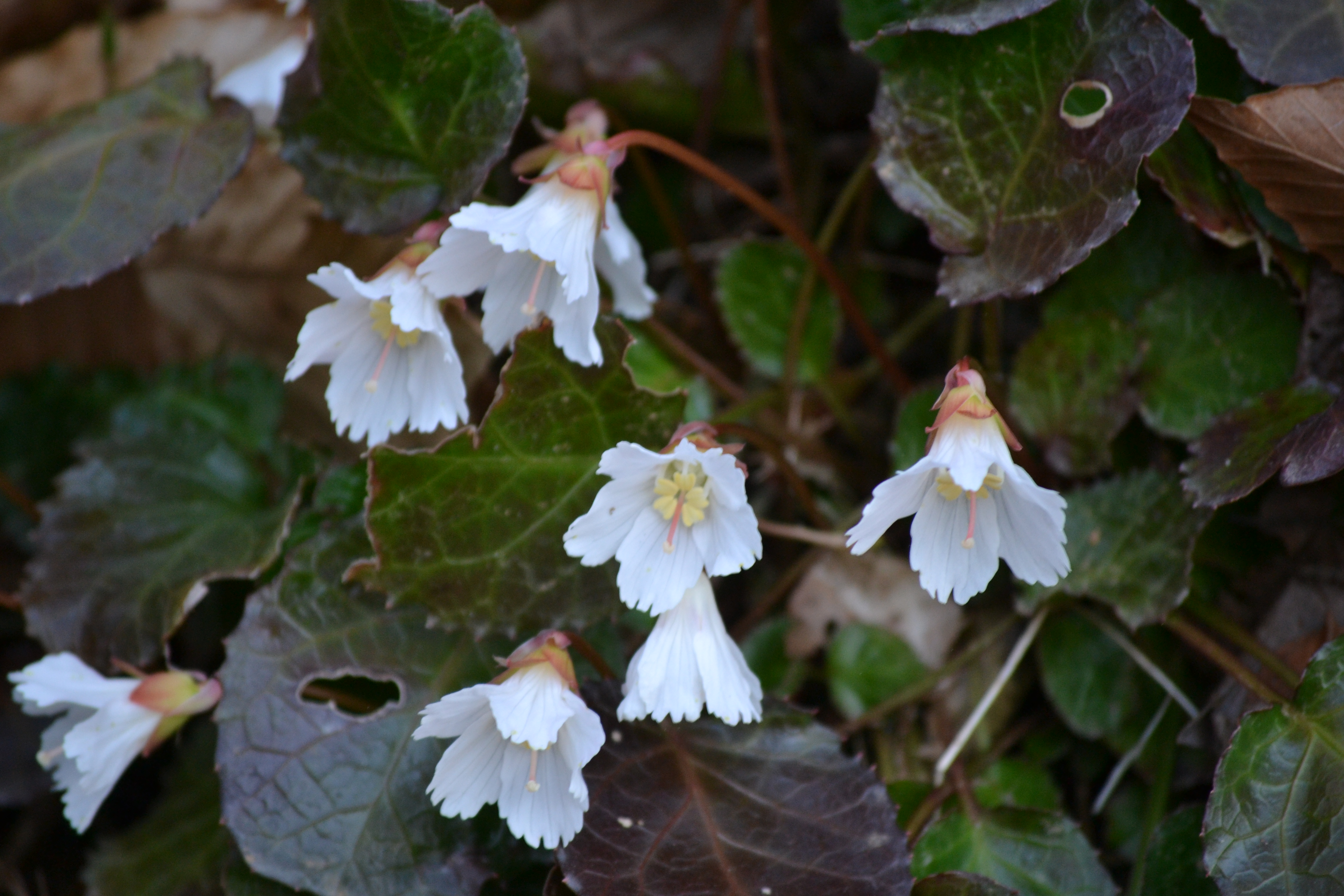
- Shortia galacifolia

Scientific classification
- Kingdom: Plantae
- Clade: Tracheophytes
- Clade: Angiosperms
- Clade: Eudicots
- Clade: Asterids
- Order: Ericales
- Family: Diapensiaceae
- Genus: Shortia; Torr. & A.Gray

Type species
- Shortia galacifolia

= Shortia =

Family of shrubs

Shortia is a small genus of subshrubs or perennial herbs in the family Diapensiaceae. There are five species, four in Asia and one in the Appalachian Mountains of eastern North America. They are found in mountainous areas, generally from 1,000–2,000 metres (3,300–6,600 ft) elevation. All have restricted ranges and are generally considered rare. Three of the species, S. galacifolia, S. soldanelloides, and S. uniflora are often cultivated. The genus was named by Asa Gray after botanist Charles Wilkins Short. In Gray's diary entry for April 8, 1839, he named the genus after Charles Wilkins Short because the plant was native to America in a region close to where Short lived, which was Kentucky. Short and Gray never met but they corresponded with one another frequently. Short never saw a live nor dried specimen of his namesake genus.

== Species ==
Image	Name	Distribution
	Shortia exappendiculata Hayata	Taiwan
	Shortia galacifolia Torr. and Gray	southeastern United States, North and South Carolina and Georgia
	Shortia sinensis Hemsley	China, mountains of southeast Yunnan
	Shortia soldanelloides (Siebold & Zuccarini) Makino	Japan, southern Hokkaido through Honshu and Kyushu to Yakushima
	Shortia uniflora (Maximowicz) Maximowicz	Japan, northern Honshu
