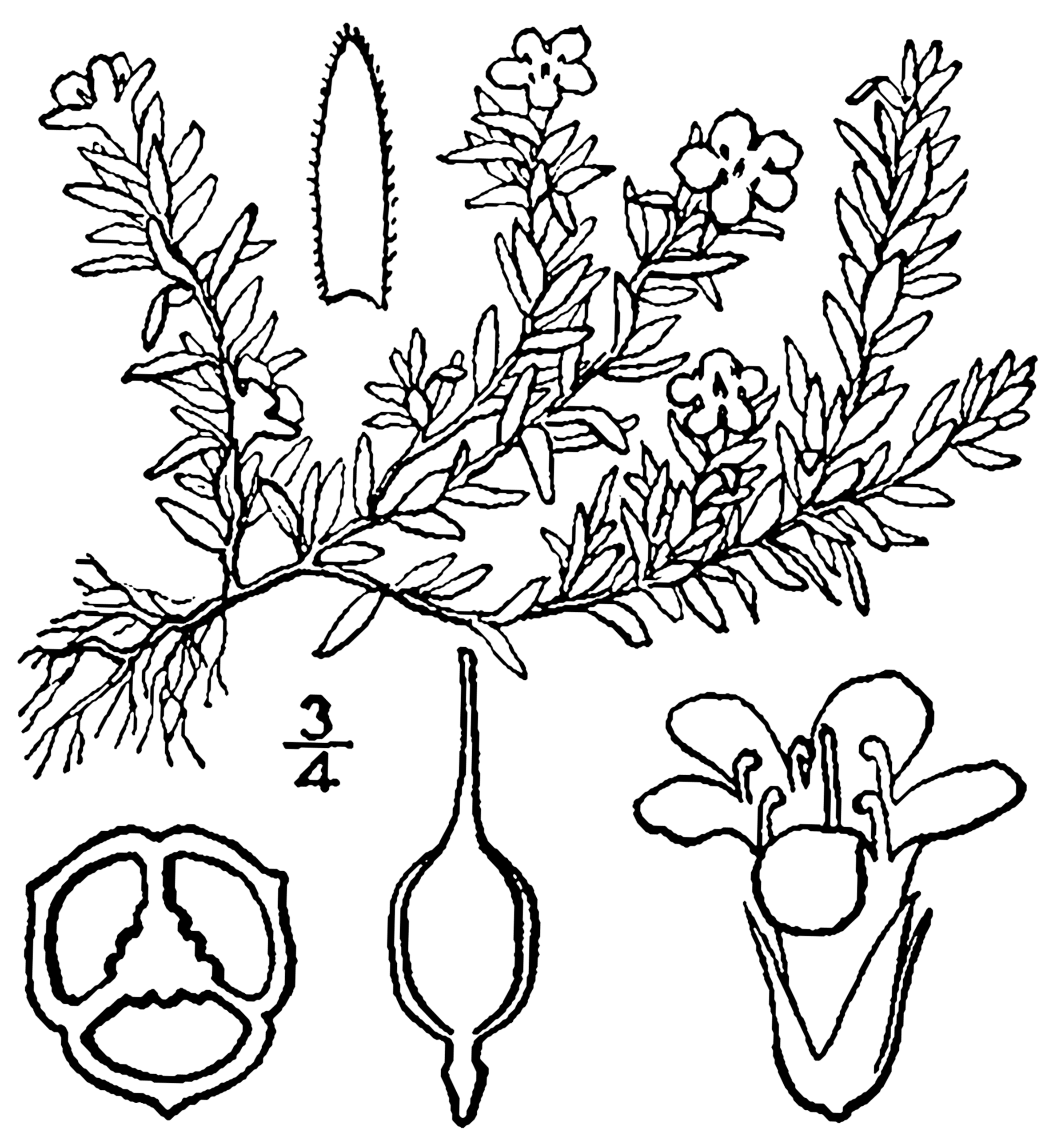

Conservation status
- Apparently Secure (NatureServe)

Scientific classification
- Kingdom: Plantae
- Clade: Tracheophytes
- Clade: Angiosperms
- Clade: Eudicots
- Clade: Asterids
- Order: Ericales
- Family: Diapensiaceae
- Genus: Pyxidanthera
- Species: P. barbulata

Binomial name
- Pyxidanthera barbulata Michx.

= Pyxidanthera barbulata =

Species of flowering plant

Pyxidanthera barbulata, the flowering pixiemoss, is a species of flowering plant in the family Diapensiaceae. It is native to the eastern United States, occurring on the coast from Long Island to New Jersey and Virginia to South Carolina.

Pyxidanthera barbulata is not a moss. It is a low subshrub producing a mat on the ground. It grows from a rhizome and the stems root at intervals where they meet the ground. The crowded leaves are lance-shaped and no more than a centimeter long. The flowers have pink sepals and white petals up to about half a centimeter long.

This plant grows in dry, sandy soils under pines. Though it may occur in wetlands, it is well adapted to dry conditions. It is also adapted to habitat prone to wildfire. It is known from pine barrens, flatwoods, sandhills, and the edges of pocosins.
