= North Bend, Ohio =

- Village
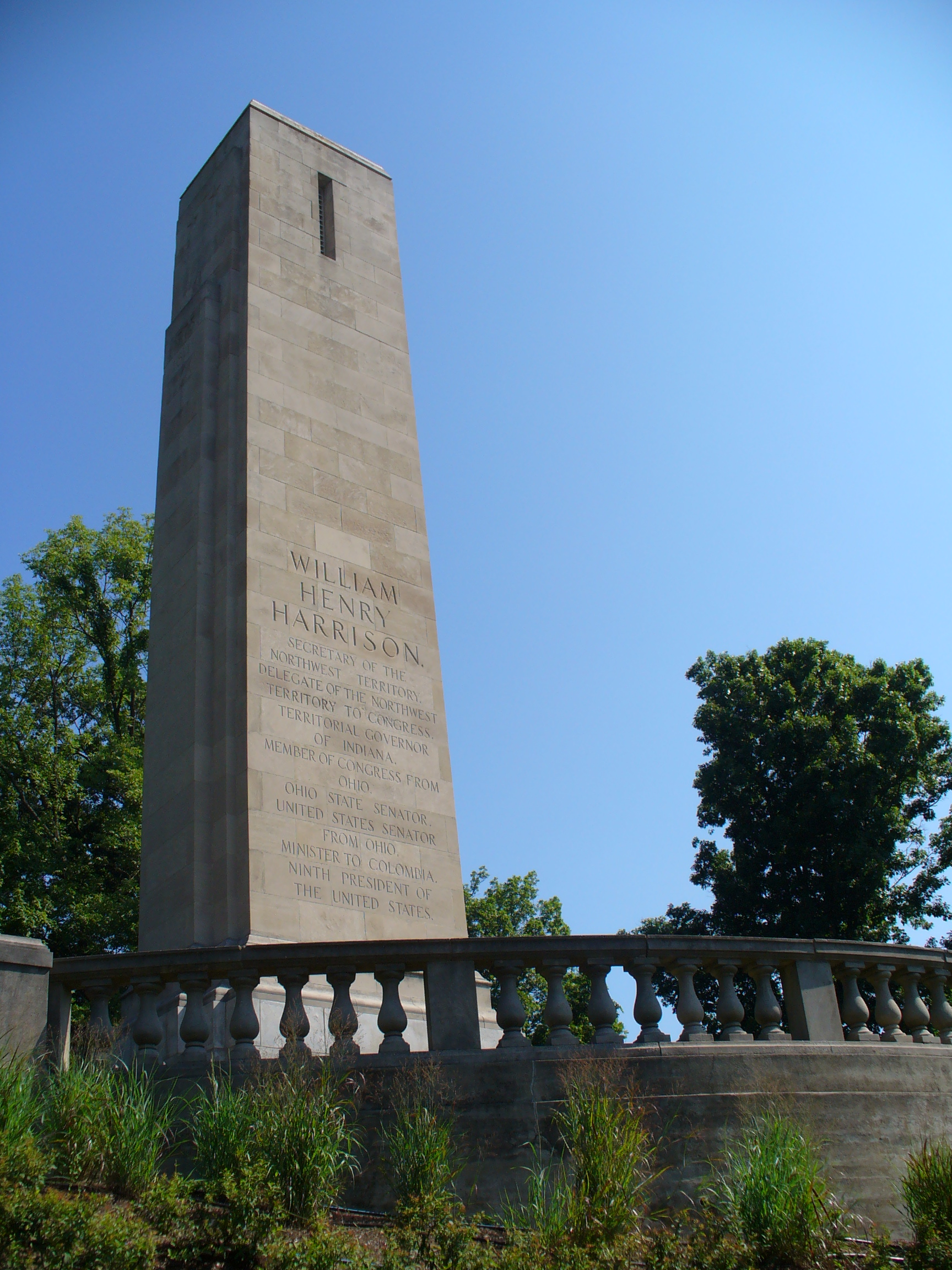
- Harrison's Tomb

- Flag

- Location in Hamilton County and the state of Ohio
- Coordinates: 39°09′02″N 84°44′40″W
- Country: United States
- State: Ohio
- County: Hamilton
- Township: Miami

Government
  - Type: Mayor-council government
  - Mayor: Doug Sammons

Area
  - Total: 1.15 sq mi (2.98 km^{2})
  - Land: 1.09 sq mi (2.83 km^{2})
  - Water: 0.058 sq mi (0.15 km^{2})
- Elevation: 614 ft (187 m)

Population (2020)
  - Total: 835
  - Density: 764.0/sq mi (294.97/km^{2})
- Time zone: UTC-5 (Eastern (EST))
  - Summer (DST): UTC-4 (EDT)
- ZIP code: 45052
- Area code: 513
- FIPS code: 39-56182
- GNIS feature ID: 2399511
- Website: www.northbendohio.org

North Bend is a village in Miami Township, Hamilton County, Ohio, United States, along the Ohio River. It is a part of the Greater Cincinnati area. The population was 835 at the 2020 census.

== History ==
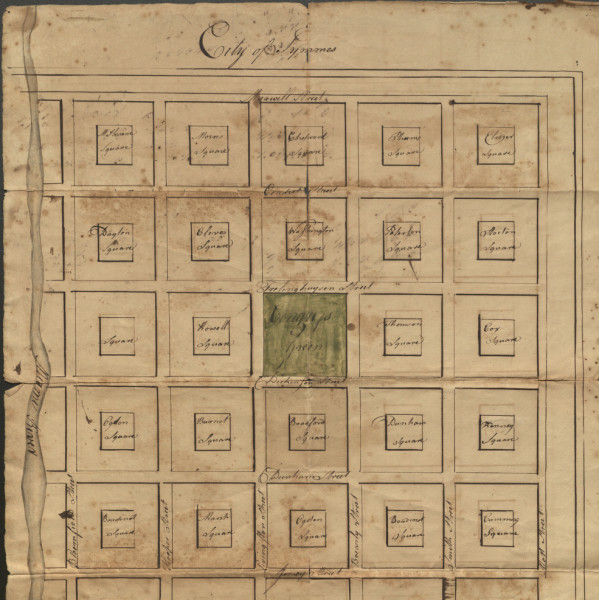
Early map of Symmes City

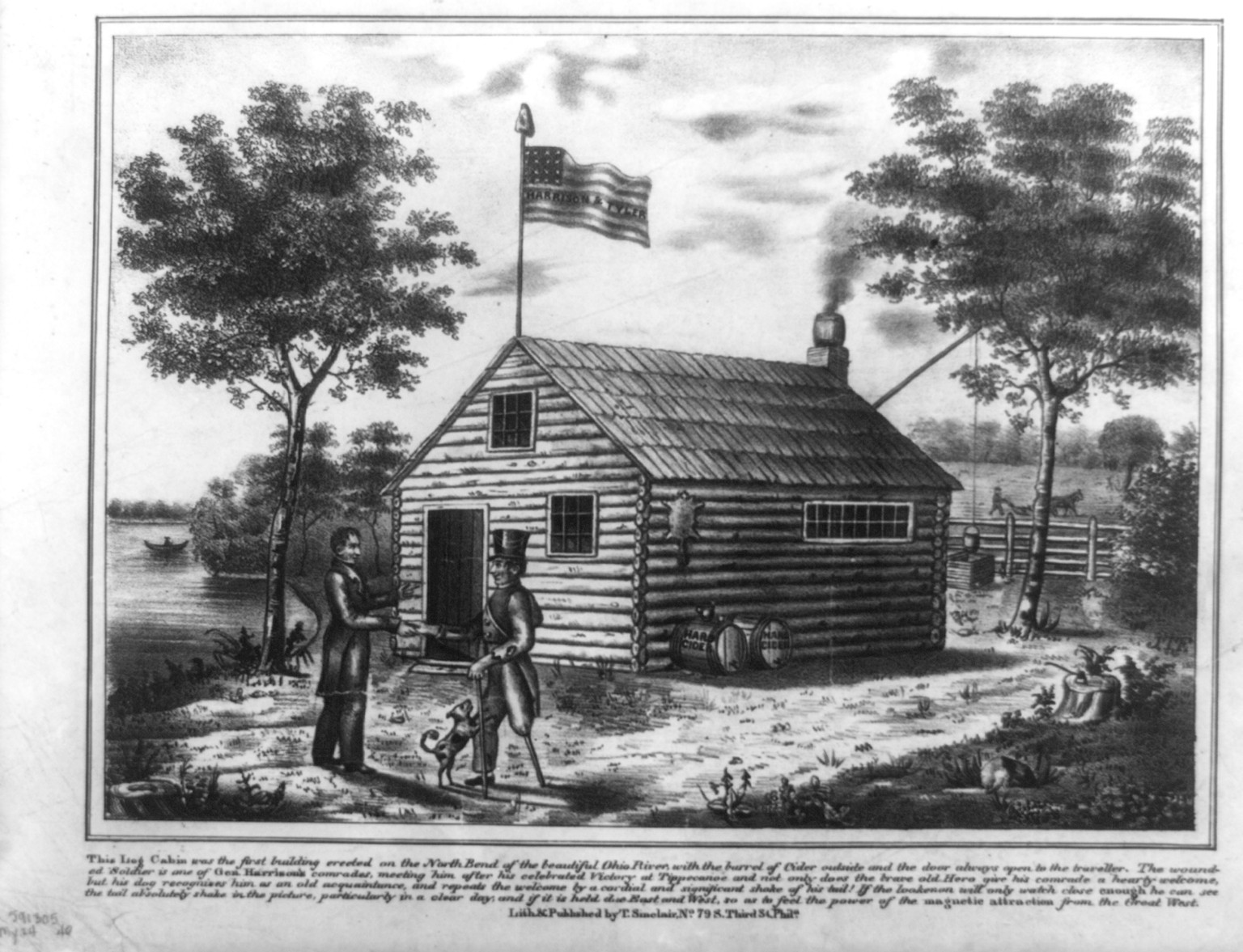
William Henry Harrison greets a visitor at the "First building on North Bend" in an 1840 lithograph

North Bend was founded in 1789. It was platted as Symmes City but ultimately never took that name. Instead, it was incorporated as the village of North Bend in 1845. It is named for its location, where the Ohio River meanders to the north.

President Benjamin Harrison was born in North Bend. It was the home of his grandfather, President William Henry Harrison. North Bend is the location of the grave of John Cleves Symmes at Congress Green Cemetery and of the William Henry Harrison Tomb State Memorial, the grave of William Henry Harrison. John Scott Harrison, the only man in U.S. history to be the son of a president and the father of a president, was born in North Bend and is buried in his father's vault in North Bend. Eliza Hendricks, wife of U.S. Vice President Thomas A. Hendricks, also was born in North Bend.

On May 5, 1865, North Bend was the site of an early hold-up of a railway train.

== Geography ==
According to the United States Census Bureau, the village has a total area of 1.15 square miles (2.98 km^{2}), of which 1.07 square miles (2.77 km^{2}) is land and 0.08 square miles (0.21 km^{2}) is water.

== Demographics ==
Historical population
Census	Pop.	Note	%±
1880	412		—
1900	532		—
1910	560		5.3%
1920	597		6.6%
1930	597		0.0%
1940	679		13.7%
1950	711		4.7%
1960	622		−12.5%
1970	638		2.6%
1980	546		−14.4%
1990	541		−0.9%
2000	603		11.5%
2010	857		42.1%
2020	835		−2.6%
U.S. Decennial Census

=== 2020 census ===
As of the census of 2020, there were 835 people living in the village, for a population density of 763.95 people per square mile (294.97/km^{2}). There were 423 housing units. The racial makeup of the village was 93.4% White, 0.5% Black or African American, 0.8% Native American, 0.0% Asian, 0.0% Pacific Islander, 1.0% from some other race, and 4.3% from two or more races. 0.7% of the population were Hispanic or Latino of any race.

There were 430 households, out of which 28.8% had children under the age of 18 living with them, 62.3% were married couples living together, 9.8% had a male householder with no spouse present, and 25.3% had a female householder with no spouse present. 14.9% of all households were made up of individuals, and 9.8% were someone living alone who was 65 years of age or older. The average household size was 2.46, and the average family size was 2.73.

22.1% of the village's population were under the age of 18, 43.9% were 18 to 64, and 34.0% were 65 years of age or older. The median age was 53.9. For every 100 females, there were 120.0 males.

According to the U.S. Census American Community Survey, for the period 2016-2020 the estimated median annual income for a household in the village was $88,910, and the median income for a family was $103,333. About 11.9% of the population were living below the poverty line, including 26.6% of those under age 18 and 4.2% of those age 65 or over. About 50.6% of the population were employed, and 38.4% had a bachelor's degree or higher.

=== 2010 census ===
As of the census of 2010, there were 857 people, 370 households, and 278 families living in the village. The population density was 800.9 inhabitants per square mile (309.2/km^{2}). There were 412 housing units at an average density of 385.0 per square mile (148.6/km^{2}). The racial makeup of the village was 97.3% White, 0.6% African American, 0.1% Native American, 0.5% Asian, 0.8% from other races, and 0.7% from two or more races. Hispanic or Latino of any race were 1.2% of the population.

There were 370 households, of which 20.8% had children under the age of 18 living with them, 61.9% were married couples living together, 8.9% had a female householder with no husband present, 4.3% had a male householder with no wife present, and 24.9% were non-families. 21.6% of all households were made up of individuals, and 10.6% had someone living alone who was 65 years of age or older. The average household size was 2.32 and the average family size was 2.63.

The median age in the village was 52.7 years. 15.9% of residents were under the age of 18; 7.3% were between the ages of 18 and 24; 15.8% were from 25 to 44; 37.3% were from 45 to 64; and 23.7% were 65 years of age or older. The gender makeup of the village was 50.1% male and 49.9% female.

=== 2000 census ===
As of the census of 2000, there were 603 people, 253 households, and 182 families living in the village. The population density was 560.3 inhabitants per square mile (216.3/km^{2}). There were 290 housing units at an average density of 269.5 per square mile (104.1/km^{2}). The racial makeup of the village was 99.83% White and 0.17% African American.

There were 253 households, out of which 28.1% had children under the age of 18 living with them, 58.1% were married couples living together, 8.7% had a female householder with no husband present, and 27.7% were non-families. 24.1% of all households were made up of individuals, and 11.9% had someone living alone who was 65 years of age or older. The average household size was 2.38 and the average family size was 2.80.

In the village, the population was spread out, with 22.2% under the age of 18, 7.3% from 18 to 24, 23.4% from 25 to 44, 31.2% from 45 to 64, and 15.9% who were 65 years of age or older. The median age was 43 years. For every 100 females, there were 93.3 males. For every 100 females age 18 and over, there were 92.2 males.

The median income for a household in the village was $51,979, and the median income for a family was $60,833. Males had a median income of $45,000 versus $26,563 for females. The per capita income for the village was $28,792. About 4.9% of families and 6.5% of the population were below the poverty line, including 10.1% of those under age 18 and 4.5% of those age 65 or over.

== See also ==
- List of cities and towns along the Ohio River
