= Congress Green Cemetery =

Cemetery in North Bend, Ohio, United States

Coordinates: 39°09′06″N 84°45′07″W

Details
- Closed: 1884
- Location: North Bend, Ohio
- Country: United States
- Type: Military
- Find a Grave: Congress Green Cemetery
- The Political Graveyard: Congress Green Cemetery

Congress Green Cemetery is a historic military cemetery in North Bend, Ohio, near Cincinnati.

The plot was excluded from Symmes Purchase because it was thought to contain mineral deposits. The land was first owned by the family of William Henry Harrison; this is recorded by a historical marker at the cemetery.

Interments include John Cleves Symmes, father-in-law of William Henry Harrison.

The cemetery is located opposite the William Henry Harrison Tomb State Memorial, the resting place of the former president and his wife.

== See also ==
- Pioneer Memorial Cemetery, Cincinnati
