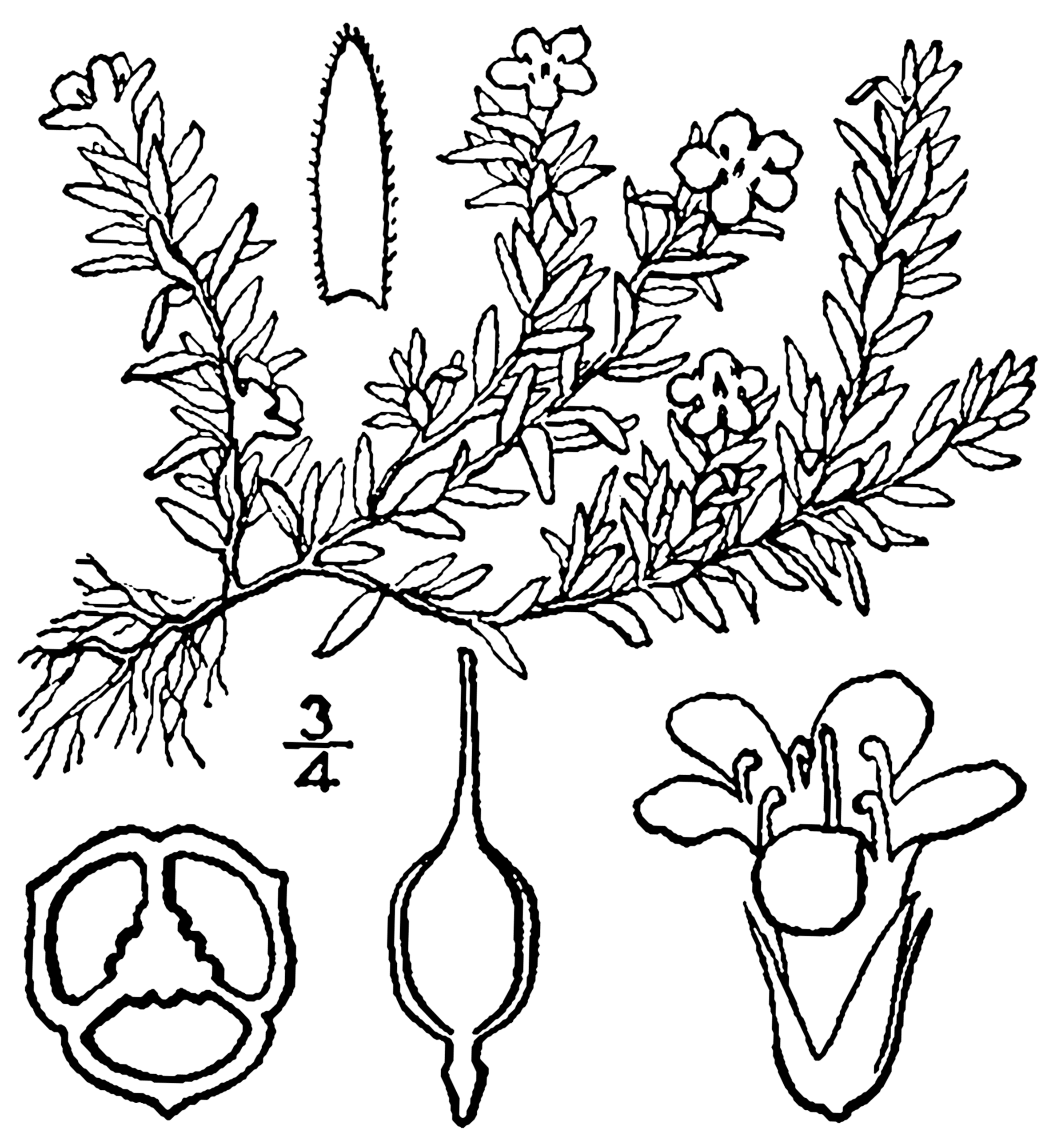
- Pyxidanthera barbulata

Scientific classification
- Kingdom: Plantae
- Clade: Tracheophytes
- Clade: Angiosperms
- Clade: Eudicots
- Clade: Asterids
- Order: Ericales
- Family: Diapensiaceae
- Genus: Pyxidanthera; Michx.

Species
- Pyxidanthera barbulata; Pyxidanthera brevifolia

= Pyxidanthera =

Genus of flowering plants

Pyxidanthera is a genus of flowering plant in the family Diapensiaceae. Though often recognized as two species, Pyxidanthera barbulata and Pyxidanthera brevifolia, these designations are not genetically or morphologically distinct. Furthermore, these two designated species were found to not be reciprocally monophyletic.

Despite these findings, some flora still recognize these two species based on their range, habitat, and leaf morphology (size and pubescence). However, these leaf morphology differences are directly related to habitat and moisture. Despite the species designations being based on habitat and moisture, climatic niche differentiation is not found between the two species. Therefore, these species designations are strictly based on range, despite the overlapping range of the two species. The most widespread species, Pyxidanthera barbulata, is native to the eastern United States, occurring on the coast from Long Island to New Jersey and Virginia to South Carolina. A second species of Pyxidanthera called Pyxidanthera brevifolia, known only from North and South Carolina.
