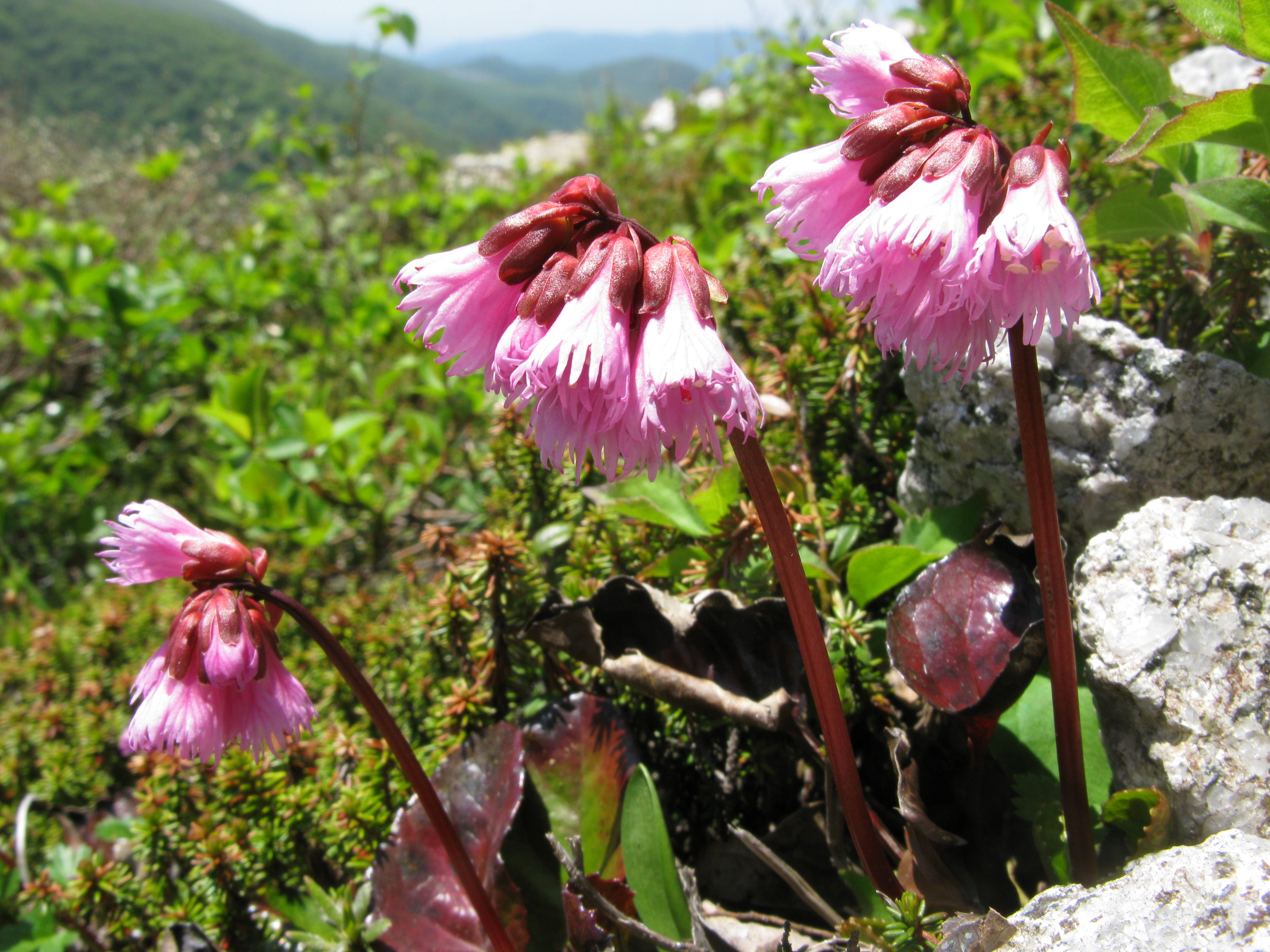
- Schizocodon soldanelloides in Japan

Scientific classification
- Kingdom: Plantae
- Clade: Tracheophytes
- Clade: Angiosperms
- Clade: Eudicots
- Clade: Asterids
- Order: Ericales
- Family: Diapensiaceae
- Genus: Schizocodon; Siebold & Zucc.

= Schizocodon =

Genus of plants

Schizocodon is a genus of flowering plants belonging to the family Diapensiaceae.

Its native range is Southern Central China, Japan.

== Species ==
Species:

- Schizocodon ilicifolius Maxim.
- Schizocodon soldanelloides Siebold & Zucc.
- Schizocodon yunnanensis T.Yamaz.
