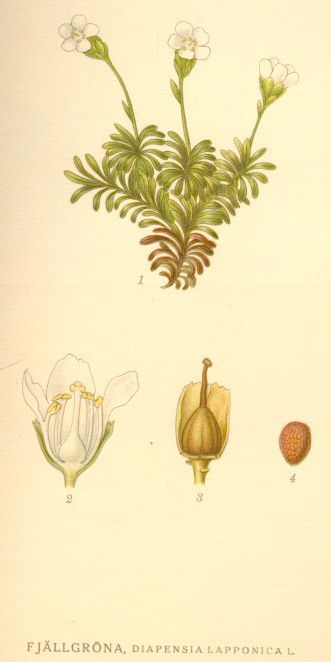
- Botanical illustration of Diapensia lapponica subsp. lapponica

Scientific classification
- Kingdom: Plantae
- Clade: Tracheophytes
- Clade: Angiosperms
- Clade: Eudicots
- Clade: Asterids
- Order: Ericales
- Family: Diapensiaceae
- Genus: Diapensia; L.

Species
- See text

= Diapensia =

Genus of Diapensiaceae plants

Diapensia is a genus of flowering plants of the family Diapensiaceae. Most of the species are found in the Himalayas. Diapensia lapponica has a high Arctic, circumpolar distribution.

== Species ==
The following species are recognised in the genus Diapensia:

- Diapensia albida (W.E.Evans) J.F.Ye
- Diapensia himalaica Hook.f. & Thomson
- Diapensia lapponica L.
- Diapensia obovata (F.Schmidt) Nakai
- Diapensia purpurea Diels
- Diapensia wardii W.E.Evans
