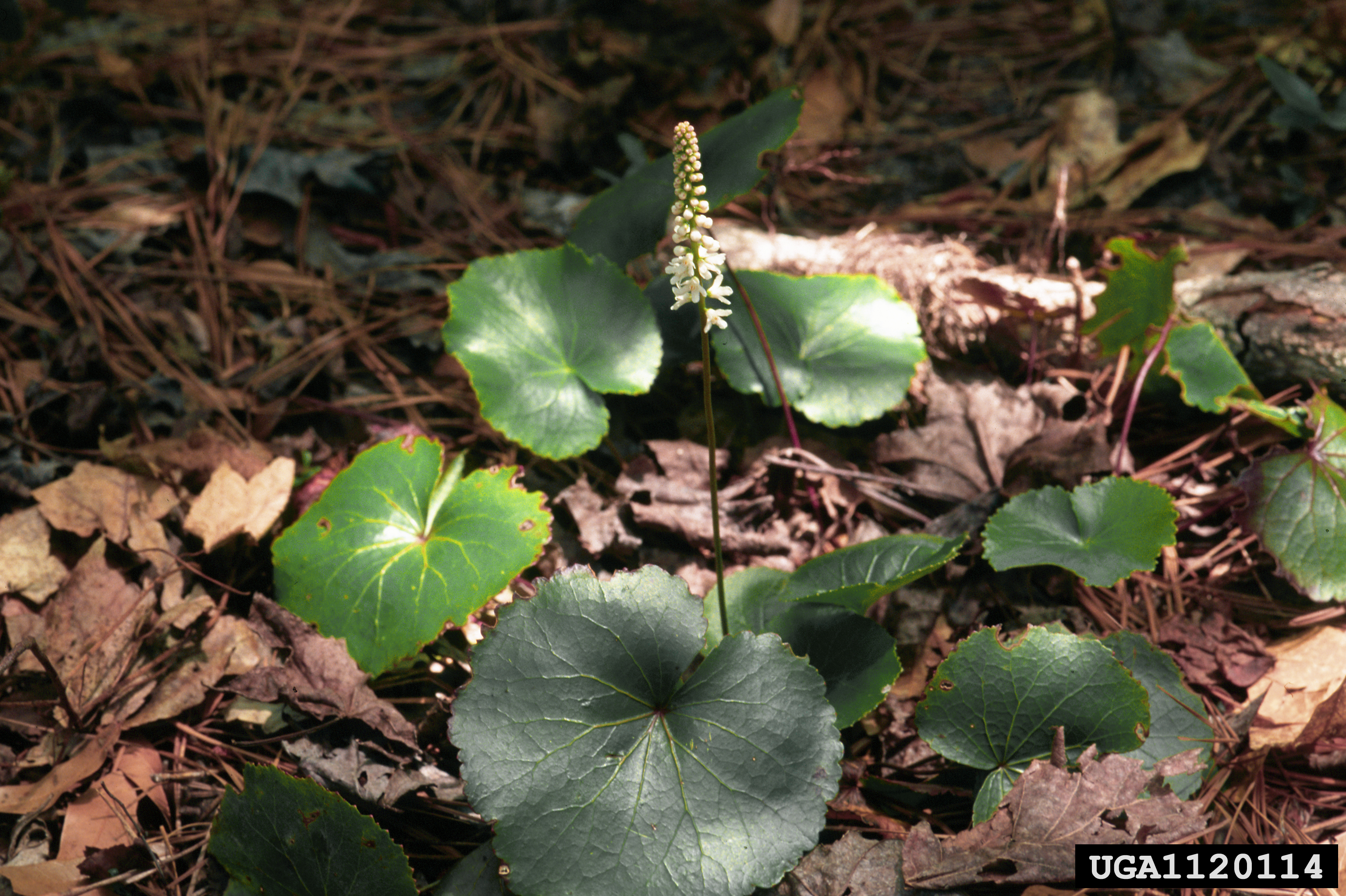

Scientific classification
- Kingdom: Plantae
- Clade: Embryophytes
- Clade: Tracheophytes
- Clade: Angiosperms
- Clade: Eudicots
- Clade: Asterids
- Order: Ericales
- Family: Diapensiaceae
- Genus: Galax; Sims
- Species: G. urceolata

Binomial name
- Galax urceolata (Poir.) Brummit

= Galax =

Genus of flowering plants

Galax, the wandplant, wandflower, or beetleweed, is a genus in the flowering plant family Diapensiaceae, containing a single species, Galax urceolata (syn. G. rotundifolia, G. aphylla). It is native to the southeastern United States from Massachusetts and New York south to northern Alabama, growing mainly in the Appalachian Mountains at altitudes of up to 1,500 m, where it grows in shaded places in forests. Galax urceolata can occur at multiple ploidy levels, an individual may be a diploid (2x), triploid (3x), or autotetraploid (4x) (autopolyploid). The cytotypes are neither morphologically nor geographically distinct, though there are slight climatic differences between the diploid and autotetraploid types. Outcrossing is likely to occur among cytotypes as well.

== Description ==
It is an evergreen herbaceous perennial plant growing to 30–45 cm (rarely 75 cm) tall, with a rosette of leathery leaves, which turn brown during winter. The leaves are a rounded cardioid (heart) shape, 2.5–7.5 cm diameter, rarely up to 15 cm, with a serrated margin with rounded "teeth". The flowers are produced in late spring to early summer, white in color and on a single spike-like raceme 15–25 cm long on top of a 20–50 cm tall stem. Each individual flower has five petals, and is up to 4 mm (5/32 in) in diameter. The fruit is a small capsule containing numerous seeds.

== Taxonomy ==
The genus name Galax comes from the Greek word "gala" which means "milk", describing Galax's white flowers.

Around 1730, Galax was collected by John Clayton, due to his friendship with Mark Catesby, an English naturalist who had just arrived in Virginia. Based on Catesby's recommendation, Clayton ended up sending his specimens to Jan Frederik Gronovius, a Dutch botanist. In 1739, Gronovius published The Flora of Virginia, where "Anonymos or Belvedere" is the plant long known as Galax aphylla. Clayton provided Gronovius with four samples, all which were destroyed in a series of unfortunate events.

Many years later, John Mitchell assumed he had collected Galax aphylla and took a ship to bring the specimen to Carl Linnaeus; however, his boat was attacked by pirates, who took all the specimens as part of their plunder. Prior to the voyage, he had sent descriptions of all the specimens to colleagues in Europe. When he arrived there, he was able to procure one of his descriptions for Linnaeus. Despite Linnaeus never seeing this specimen of “Galax”, he agreed with Mitchell's description; however, the specimen described was, in fact, "Nymophila", thus invalidating the name Galax aphylla with respect to the International Code of Nomenclature of Plants.

Between March 1803 and September 1804, Galax was rediscovered and renamed five times. Any time the new name referred to Mitchell's description, it was invalidated. The name that is considered valid, since it pre-dates all other names and follows the rules of nomenclature, was Pyrola urceolata Poir., named by Jean Louis Marie Poiret. Despite the validity of this name, Pyrola never caught on. Around this time Galax urceolata was cultivated in Europe; many descriptions came from the cultivated line (presumably sent by John Clayton), and the plant referred to as "Galax" was gaining popularity. In 1972, Brummitt argued that the genus name should remain Galax, but the specific epithet should be urceolata; therefore, he renamed it Galax urceolata (Poir.) Brummitt. However, many herbaria still label this specimen with its original invalid name, Galax aphylla.

The type specimen was collected by André Michaux, who had his horses stolen on the journey to collect Galax with John Clayton. Since the prior specimens had been destroyed and the name invalidated, this new specimen would be considered the holotype.

Names assigned between March 1803 and September 1804
Name	Authority	Date	Description
Erythrorhiza rotundifolia	André Michaux	March 1803	Noted as a synonym of Galax aphylla Linn. therefore invalidated.
Pyrola urceolata	Jean Louis Marie Poiret	January 1804	Based on a plant in cultivation in France, in the garden of M. Lemonier.
Blandfordia cordata	Henry C. Andrews	February 1804	Blandfordia was used for a genus in Liliaceae in 12/1804, and the genus name is still conserved. This name is therefore invalidated.
Galax aphylla	John Sims	June 1804	Stated synonymy with Erythrorhiza rotundifolia of Michaux, Blandfordia cordata of Andrews, Belvedere of Clayton & Gronovius, Viticella of Mitchell, and Pyrola from Poiret. - invalidated
Solenandria cordifolia	E. P. Ventenat	September 1804	Pointed out that Belvedere of Clayton & Gronovius and Viticella of Mitchell were not the same plant.

== Uses ==
The leaves are often harvested for the floristry industry; concern has been expressed over excessive exploitation, and collection is now restricted in many areas. It has also been used in herbalism to treat cuts and kidney ailments. It is occasionally grown as an ornamental plant in gardens.

The independent city of Galax, Virginia, is named after this plant.
