= Charles Wilkins Short =

American botanist and physician (1794–1863)

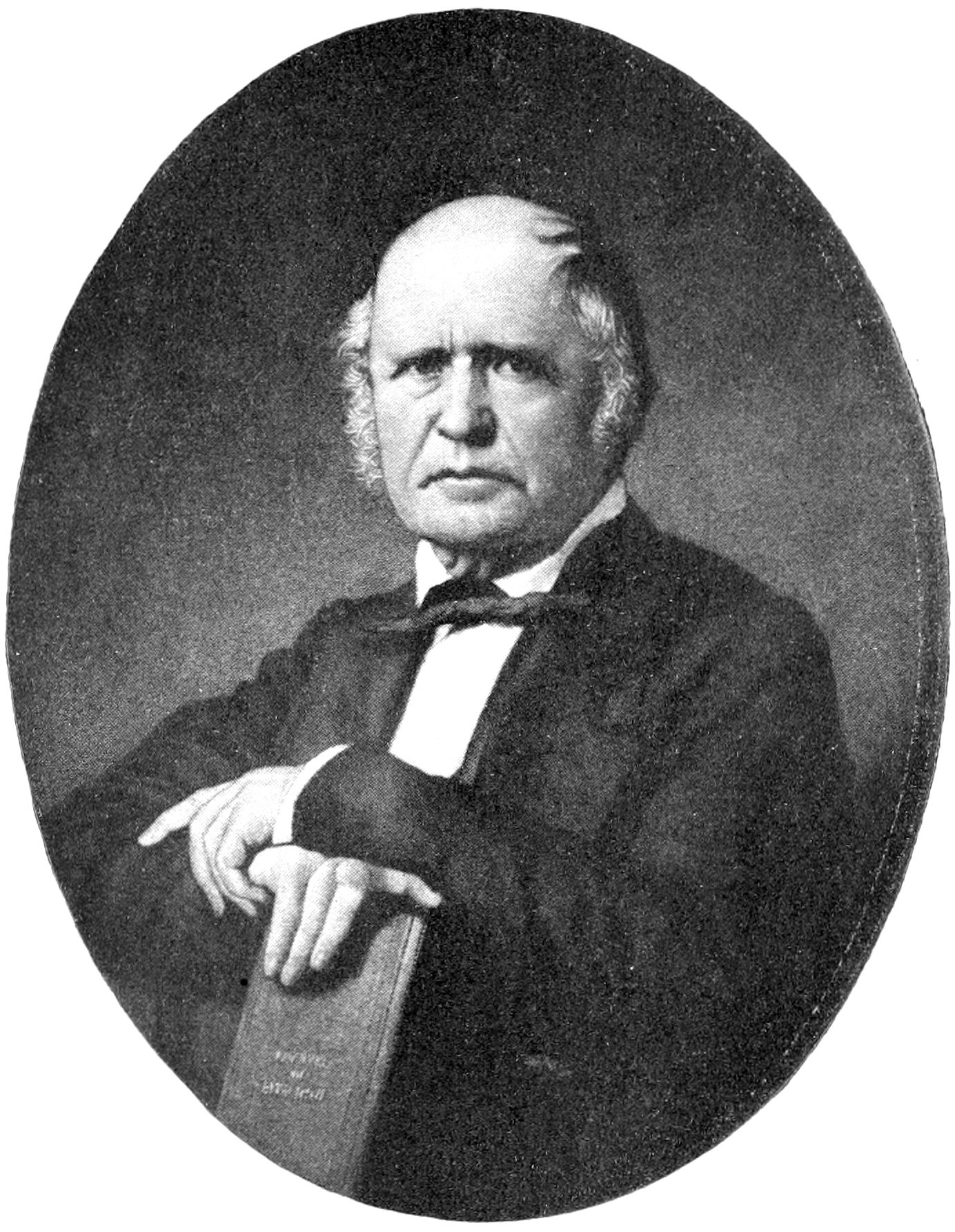
- Born: October 6, 1794; Woodford County, Kentucky, U.S.
- Died: March 7, 1863 (aged 68); Louisville, Kentucky, U.S.
- Education: Primary education with teacher Joshua Fry; studied medicine under Caspar Wistar, 1813
- Alma mater: Transylvania University (B.A., M.A.); University of Pennsylvania (M.D.)
- Occupation: Botanist
- Known for: Five species and one genus of plants are named after him; chair of Materia Medica and Medical Botany at Transylvania University; owner of one of the most complete herbariums in the United States
- Notable work: A Catalog of the Native Phaenogamous Plants and Ferns of Kentucky
- Spouse: Mary Henry Churchill (m. 1815)
- Children: 6+
- Father: Peyton Short
- Relatives: Frederick Ridgely (uncle)

Charles Wilkins Short (October 6, 1794 – March 7, 1863) was an American botanist. He primarily worked in the state of Kentucky. Short discovered several species of plants and has six species of plants named after him. He attended Transylvania University and the University of Pennsylvania. In addition to being a botanist, he practiced medicine and taught materia medica. Short also owned a sizable herbarium. Short retired from teaching in 1849.

== Early life and education ==
Short was born on October 6, 1794, in Woodford County, Kentucky. His parents were Peyton Short and Maria Symmes Short. Short had four siblings and four half-siblings. Two of his grandparents were John Cleves and Anna Tuthill Symmes. He lived on his father's farm during his early life. Short received his primary education from the well-known teacher Joshua Fry.

Short attended Transylvania University and received a Bachelor of Arts in 1810 and a Master of Arts in 1813. In 1813, he studied under Caspar Wistar in Philadelphia. He then attended the University of Pennsylvania and became a Doctor of Medicine in 1815.

== Botanical and medical career ==
Shortly after 1810, Short began practicing medicine under his uncle, Frederick Ridgely. Between 1815 and 1825, Short practiced medicine in Woodford County. Between 1825 and 1837, he was a professor of medical botany.

In 1838, Short helped establish a medical school in the University of Louisville. He was a professor there between 1838 and 1849. Upon retiring, the university's board of trustees named him professor emeritus of Materia Medica and Medical Botany.

Short made a botanical expedition along the Ohio River between March 1845 and April 1845.

Short has a total of five species and one genus of plants named after him. They are the genus Shortia, the species Vesicaria shortii, the species Phaca shortiana, the species Symphyotrichum shortii, the species Solidago shortii, and the species Carex shortiana. Short was considered to be the most well-known botanist west of the Alleghenies during the middle of the 19th century.

In addition, Short discovered a number of species of plants. These include the Kentucky pearlwort (Stellaria fontinalis) and the top-pod water lilly (Ludwigia polycarpia). He also discovered Carex shortiana and Solidago shortii, which are both named after him.

Short's most significant writing related to the field of botany in Kentucky is A Catalog of the Native Phaenogamous Plants and Ferns of Kentucky. The original work was written in 1833, but four additions were written over the next few years. The work describes a total of approximately 1300 species of plant. Short also wrote about plant life specifically in the vicinity of Lexington, Kentucky. This work was written in 1828 and 1829. Another work he wrote was a history of western American botany, in 1836. He had plans to create with Robert Peter and Henry Griswold an illustrated work describing the plant life of Kentucky, but this was never created. He was elected an Associate Fellow of the American Academy of Arts and Sciences in 1855.

== Other work ==
In 1825, Short became chair of Materia Medica and Medical Botany at Transylvania University. In 1837, he took the same position at the University of Louisville.

Short was an associate editor of the Transylvania Journal of Medicine and the Associate Sciences between 1828 and 1839. He also co-founded the journal in 1828. Additionally, Short co-wrote the book Plants of Kentucky.

Short wrote relatively little during his lifetime. All of his writings combined are less than 300 pages.

== Personal life and death ==
In November 1815, Short married Mary Henry Churchill. He returned to Kentucky shortly afterwards. The couple had several children. Six of them were surviving at Short's death in 1863; one son and five daughters.

Short owned a botanical collection with 15,000 plant samples. In his will, he requested that it be donated to the Smithsonian Institution. However, it was given to the Philadelphia Academy of Natural Sciences. An 1865 book said that the botanical collection was one of the most valuable private herbariums in the world. The book also stated that it was one of the most complete herbariums in the United States. Additionally, after retiring, Short owned a garden that spanned several acres.

Short frequently corresponded with his uncle William Short, having written over 500 letters to him by his death. Short was also against slavery. In the late 1820s, he inherited a number of slaves from his uncle. Short attempted to relocate the slaves to Africa, but had difficulty doing so.

Short was a Presbyterian for most of his life; from his early childhood until his death. He retired from medical teaching in 1849 and moved to the community of Hayfield. In that year, he also inherited a considerable fortune from his uncle, William Short. Charles Wilkins Short died of pneumonia and typhoid fever in Louisville, Kentucky on March 7, 1863.

== See also ==
- List of botanists
