= William Carmichael (diplomat) =

American diplomat

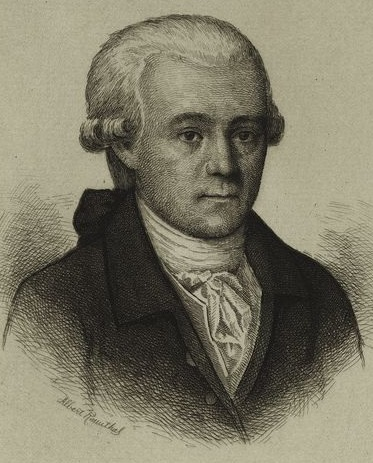

United States Chargé d'Affaires to Spain
- In office February 20, 1783 – September 5, 1794
- President: George Washington
- Preceded by: John Jay
- Succeeded by: William Short

Personal details
- Born: around 1739 Queen Anne's County, Maryland
- Died: February 9, 1795 Madrid, Spain
- Occupation: statesman and diplomat

William Carmichael (c. 1739–1795) was an American statesman and diplomat from Maryland during and after the Revolutionary War. He participated in Benjamin Franklin's mission to Paris in 1776-8, represented Maryland in the Continental Congress in 1778 and 1779 and was the principal diplomat for the United States to Spain from 1782 to 1794.

== Biography ==
=== Early life ===
Carmichael was born sometime around 1739 at the family home (Round Top) in Queen Anne's County, Maryland, on the Chester River just opposite Chestertown. Apparently, he was sent to Europe for his education, at the University of Edinburgh in Scotland. He was living in Chestertown in 1774 and was a member of its Committee of Correspondence during the Chestertown Tea Party. But by the time the Revolutionary War began, he had decamped to London, England, and soon after, in 1776, made his way to Paris, carrying letters to the Continental Congress sewn inside the cover of a pocket dictionary.

=== Early Career (1776–1792) ===
Coat of Arms of William Carmichael

In 1776, Congress named Carmichael as a Secret Agent, first as an assistant to Silas Deane. He is credited with befriending the Marquis de Lafayette and recruiting the teenage aristocrat to the American cause; when Lafayette traveled to America, he carried with him a letter of introduction from Carmichael to George Washington's aide Tench Tilghman, a fellow Marylander from the Eastern Shore. Carmichael later represented American interests at the court of Frederick II of Prussia in Berlin. He returned to America in February 1778 and the Maryland Assembly sent him as a delegate to the Continental Congress. He was elected to the American Philosophical Society in 1780.

Carmichael clashed repeatedly with many of his fellow countrymen, particularly Arthur Lee and John Jay, and his tenure in Congress was a brief and stormy one. His true milieu was the world of European courts and high society, and his principal value to his native country was as an astute and well-informed observer of European political intrigues. In 1779, then, Carmichael returned to the Old World, this time to Madrid as a diplomatic representative to Spain for the United States. At first, he was Secretary to the Legation headed by John Jay. When Jay returned in April 1782 Carmichael became Chargé d'Affaires, remaining in this post at the Spanish royal court until illness forced his replacement in 1794.

=== Late years ===
In 1792, President George Washington appointed Carmichael a commissioner plenipotentiary (together with William Short) to negotiate a treaty with Spain protecting American navigation rights to the Mississippi River. The treaty was concluded shortly after Carmichael's death and became known as the Treaty of San Lorenzo or Pinckney's Treaty, Thomas Pinckney having stepped in to complete the negotiations. Carmichael was also involved in negotiations to free American mariners who had been taken captive by the Dey of Algiers, a situation that later led to the Barbary Wars.

William Carmichael died in Madrid, Spain on February 9, 1795, and is buried in the Protestant cemetery there. He left a Spanish wife and daughter, who returned to the Eastern Shore of Maryland and were eventually compensated by the U.S. Congress for Carmichael's services. His great-nephew was Richard Bennett Carmichael, a pro-Confederate judge and politician.

Diplomatic posts
Preceded by John Jay	United States Chargé d'Affaires to Spain; 1783–1794	Succeeded by William Short
