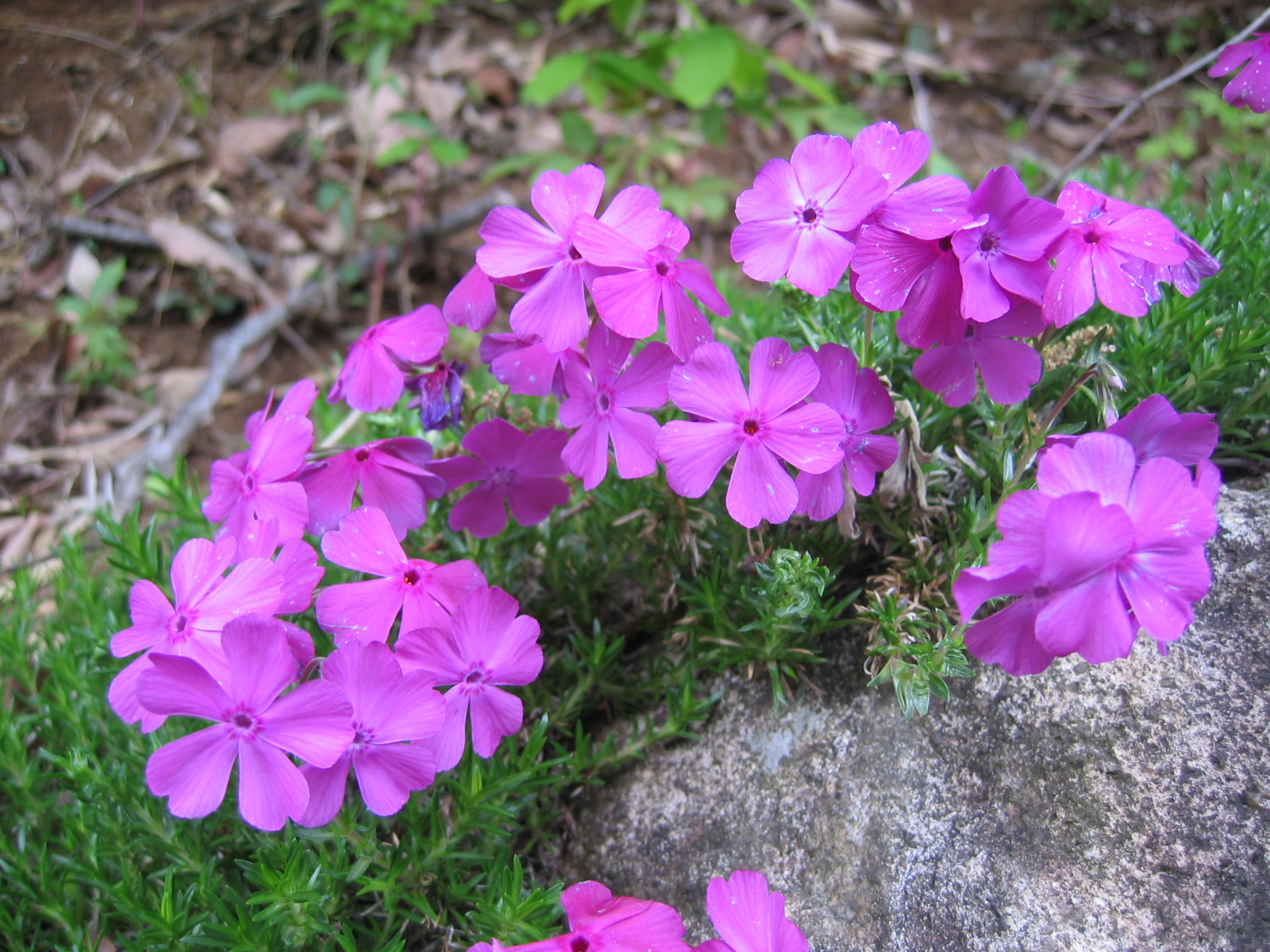

Scientific classification
- Kingdom: Plantae
- Clade: Tracheophytes
- Clade: Angiosperms
- Clade: Eudicots
- Clade: Asterids
- Order: Ericales
- Family: Polemoniaceae
- Genus: Phlox
- Species: P. subulata

Binomial name
- Phlox subulata L.

= Phlox subulata =

Species of flowering plant

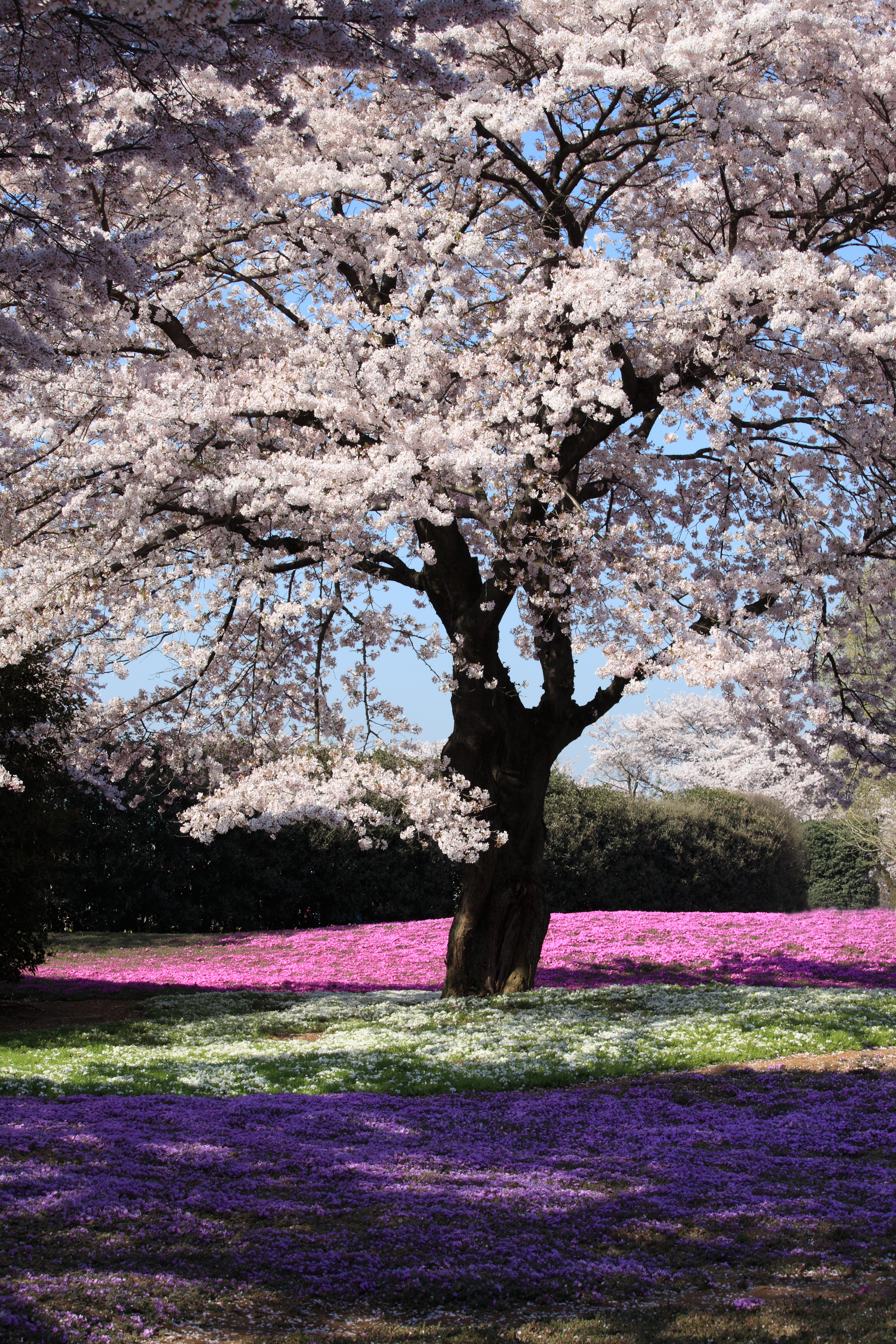
Phlox subulata in an ornamental planting beneath a cherry tree at Yachounomori Garden in Annaka, Gunma

Phlox subulata the creeping phlox, moss phlox, moss pink or mountain phlox, is a species of flowering plant in the family Polemoniaceae, native to the eastern and central United States, and widely cultivated.

The odor given off by the plants may be mistaken for that of marijuana.

== Description ==
Growing to about 13 cm (5 in) high at most and covering a 50 cm (20 in) wide area, it is an evergreen perennial forming mats or cushions of hairy, linear leaves. The small, five-petaled flowers bloom in rose, mauve, blue, white, or pink in late spring to early summer. Its habitats include rocky ledges, slopes and clearings.

== Taxonomy ==
The Latin specific epithet subulata means awl- or needle-shaped which refers to its leaves.

== Cultivation ==
The plant is cultivated as a front-of-border or groundcover plant. Requiring full sun and well-drained soil, it is very hardy, tolerating temperatures down to −20 °C (−4 °F), and is suitable for hardiness zones USDA 3 to 9. It grows in sandy or gravelly soil. It only requires light watering. In winter it's recommended to occasionally feed with liquid fertilizer before its season of flowering.

=== Cultivars ===
The following cultivars have received the Royal Horticultural Society's Award of Garden Merit:

- 'Kelly's Eye' (pink)
- 'McDaniel's Cushion' (deep pink)
- 'Red Wings' (carmine red)

== See also ==
Phlox stolonifera
