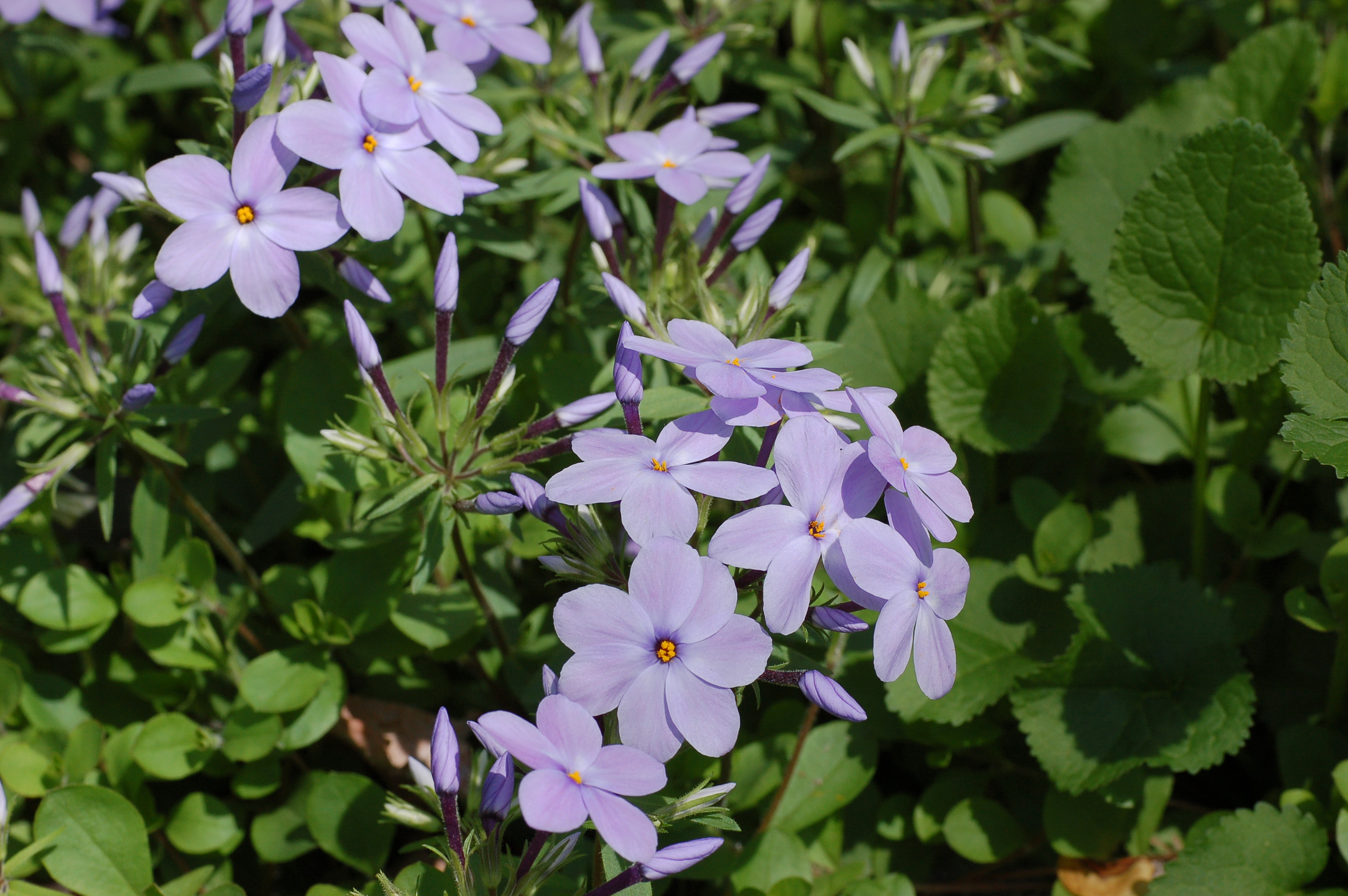

Scientific classification
- Kingdom: Plantae
- Clade: Tracheophytes
- Clade: Angiosperms
- Clade: Eudicots
- Clade: Asterids
- Order: Ericales
- Family: Polemoniaceae
- Genus: Phlox
- Species: P. stolonifera

Binomial name
- Phlox stolonifera Sims 1802

= Phlox stolonifera =

Species of flowering plant

Phlox stolonifera (creeping phlox or moss phlox) is a species of flowering plant in the family Polemoniaceae. It is a perennial herbaceous plant that is native to the eastern United States. It occurs in woodlands and stream banks in the vicinity of the Appalachian Mountains from Pennsylvania south to northern Georgia. Naturalized populations occur as far north as Québec, Canada.

Its flowers are pale purple, pink, or white, 2–2.5 cm (0.79–0.98 in) in diameter, with a five-lobed corolla and yellow stamens, which are borne on stems that are 15–25 cm (6–10 in) tall. They lack the central band of color that is present in the flowers of the related Phlox subulata.

The leaves are ovate. Those on creeping stems are 3–4.5 cm (1.2–1.8 in) long and 1.8 cm (0.71 in) broad, while those on the erect flowering stems are smaller, 2 cm (1 in) long.

The Latin specific epithet stolonifera means having stolons or rooting runners.

== Characteristics ==
The creeping phlox flowers typically have 5 petals, but there could also be 6 or 7 petals. They range from pale blue and violet to purple and vibrant.

== Uses ==
Creeping Phlox is widely used as a groundcover. Its trailing growth habit and dense mat-like foliage help suppress weed growth and prevent soil erosion on slopes or in areas where grass may not thrive.

== Gallery ==
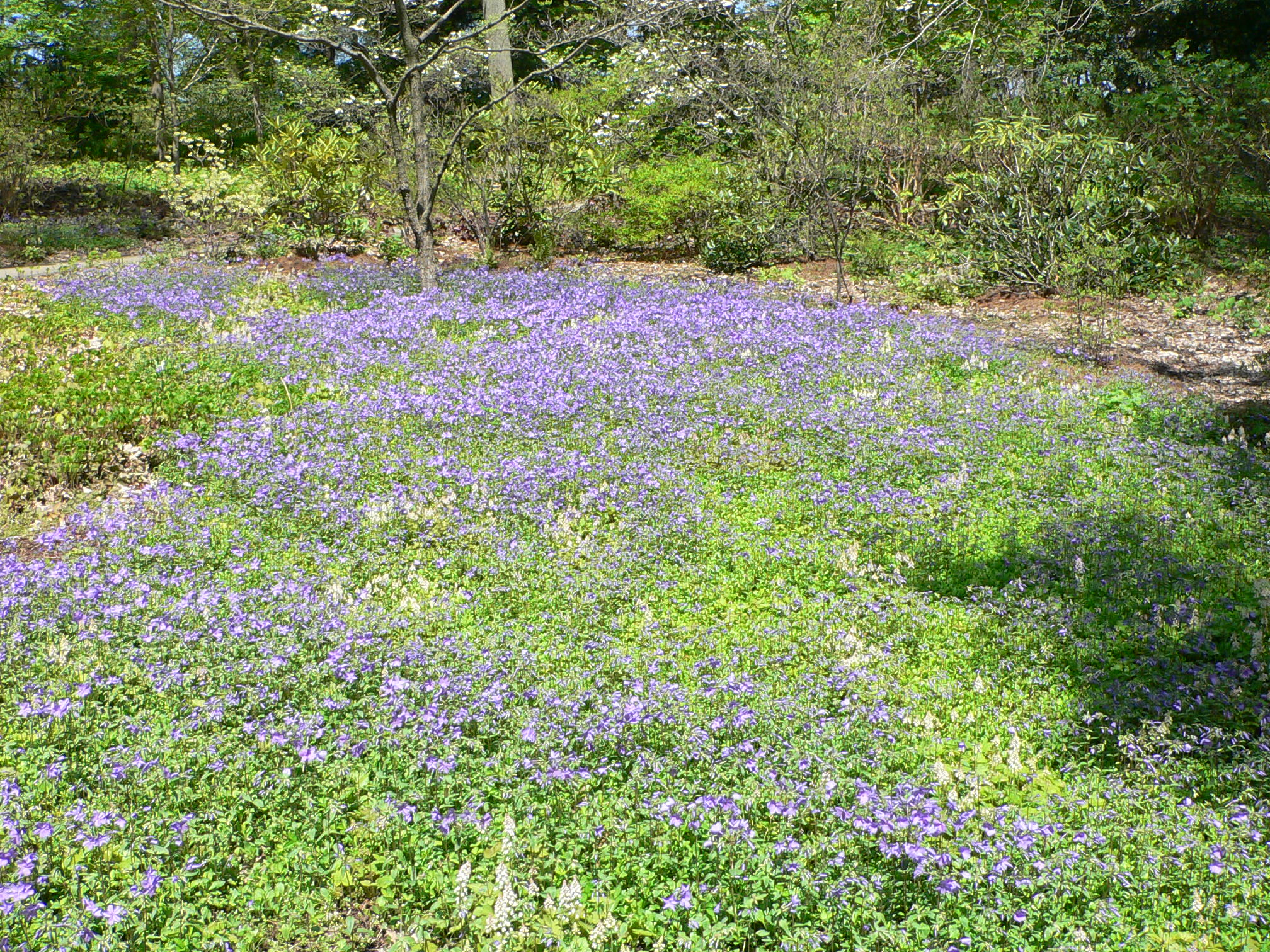
Large patch of phlox

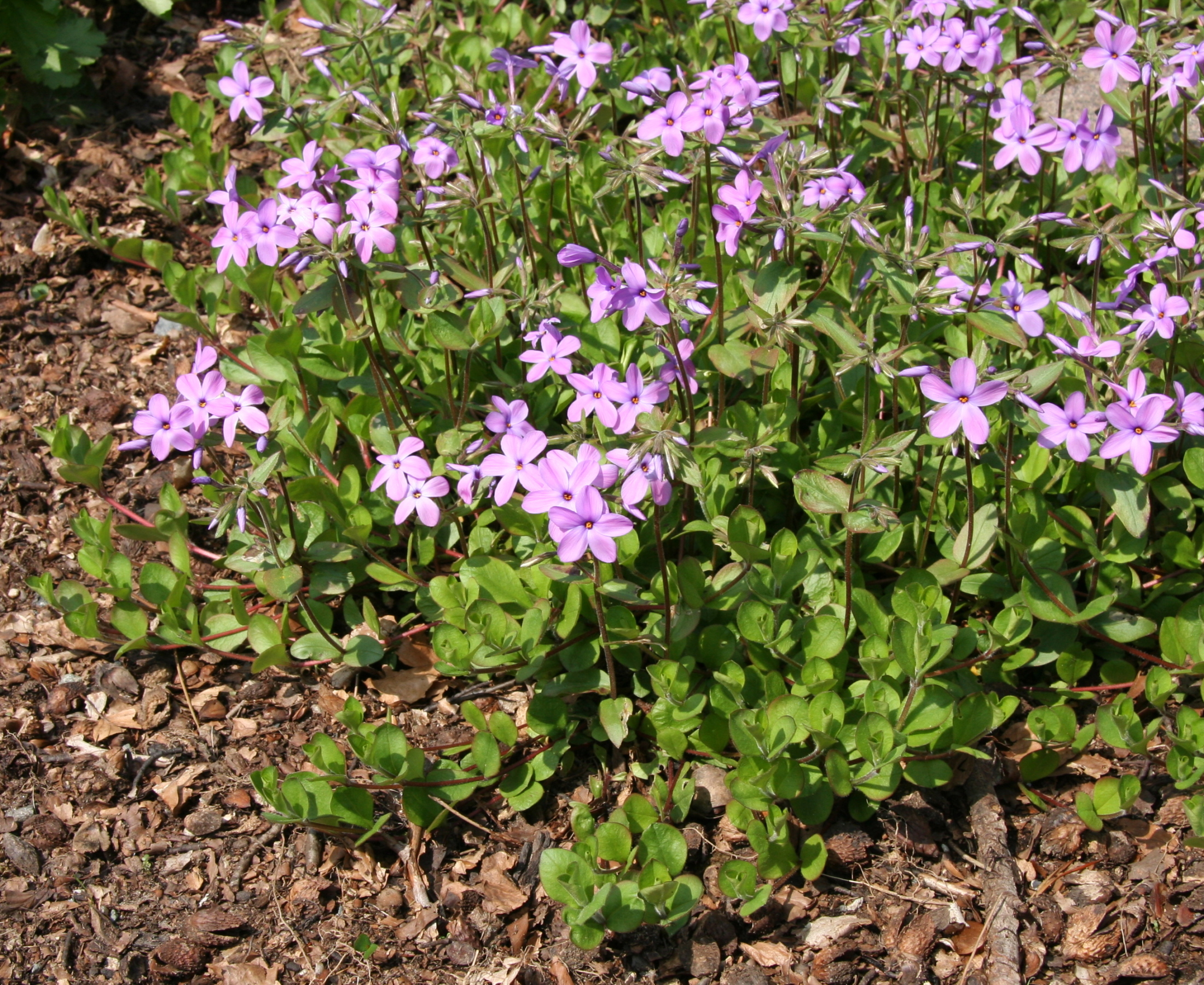
Creeping stems at edge of patch

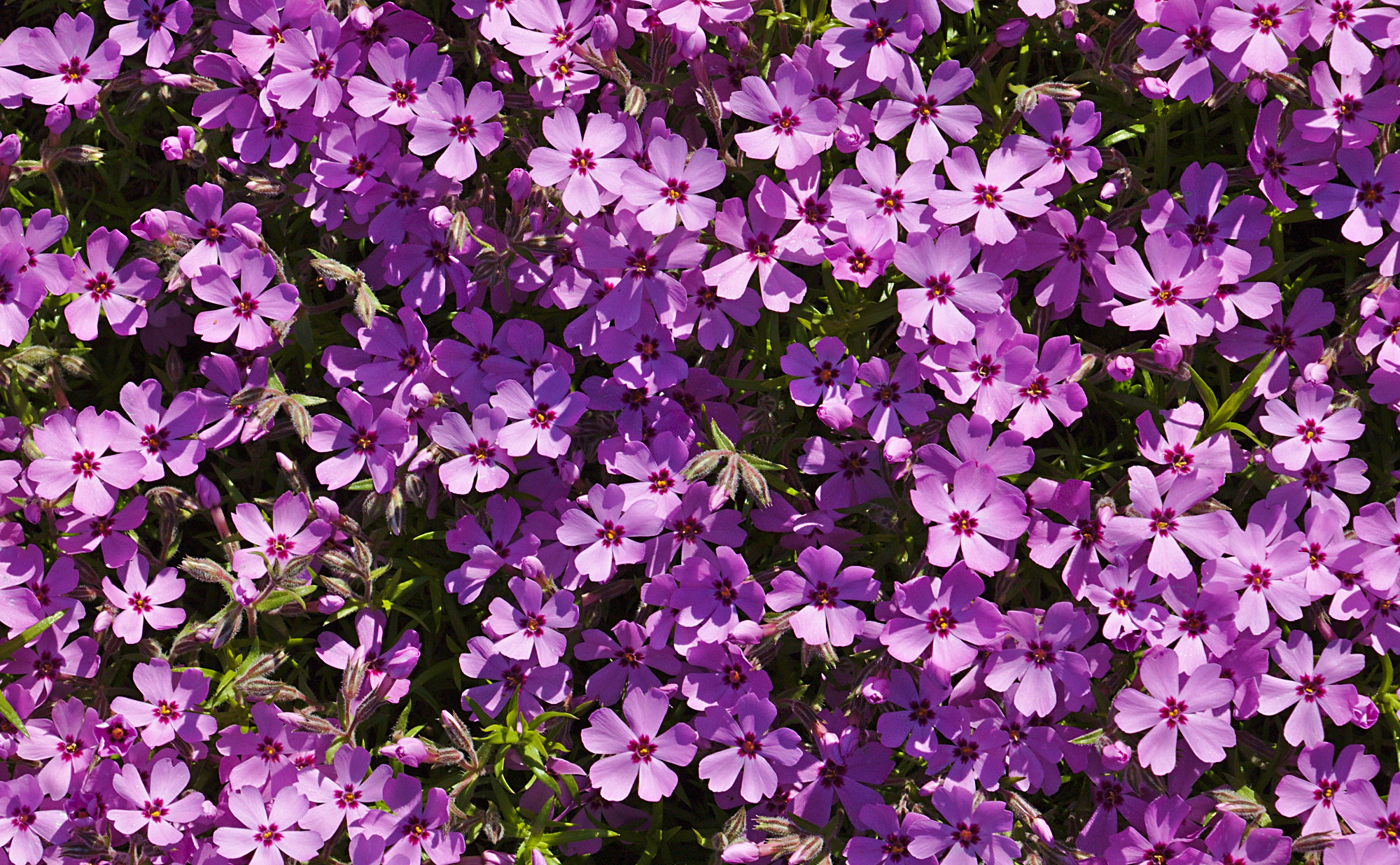
Patch of Creeping phlox
