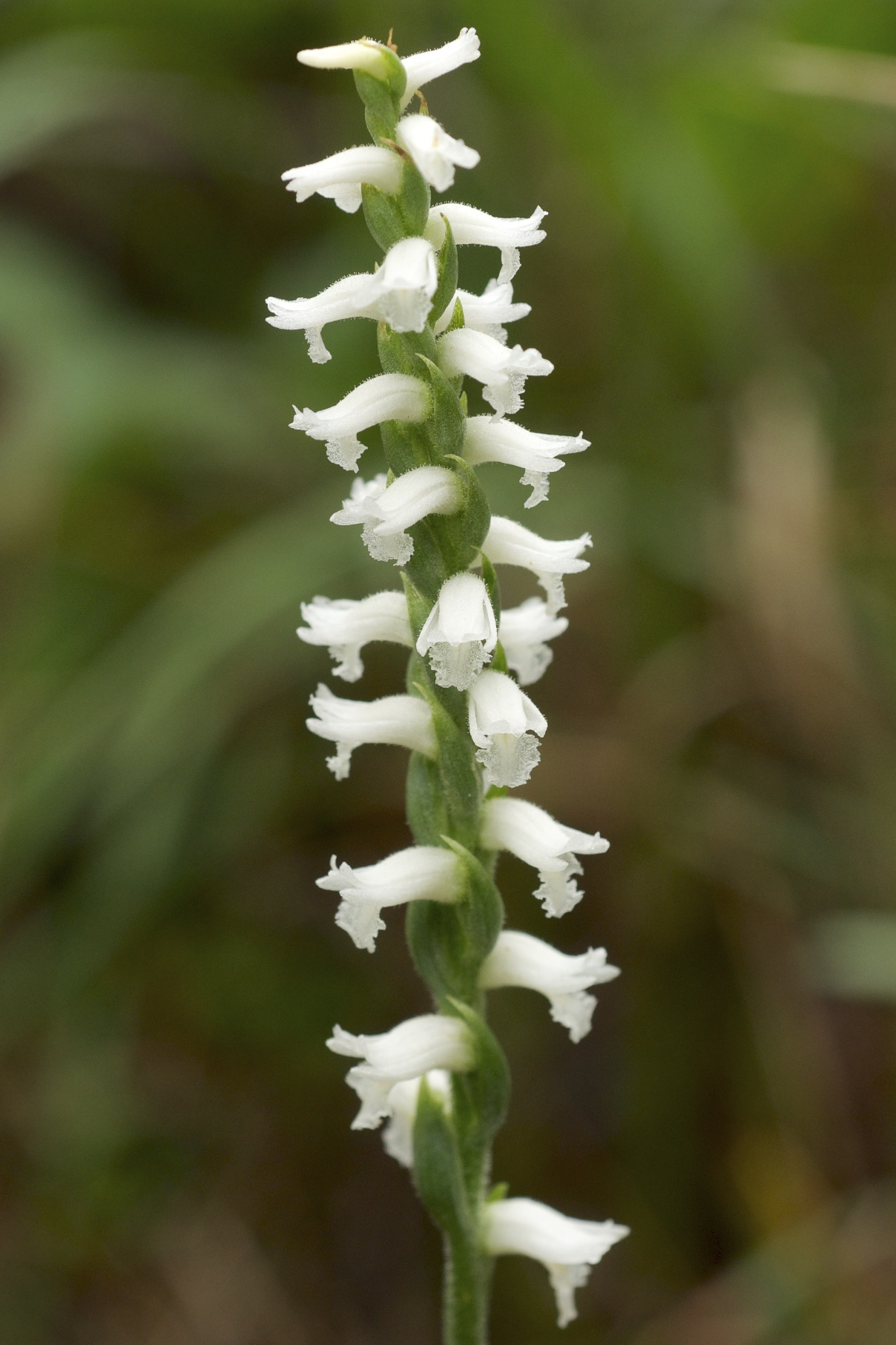

Conservation status
- Secure (NatureServe)

Scientific classification
- Kingdom: Plantae
- Clade: Tracheophytes
- Clade: Angiosperms
- Clade: Monocots
- Order: Asparagales
- Family: Orchidaceae
- Subfamily: Orchidoideae
- Tribe: Cranichideae
- Genus: Spiranthes
- Species: S. cernua

Binomial name
- Spiranthes cernua (L.) Rich.

Synonyms
- Ophrys cernua L. (basionym); Limodorum autumnale Walter; Spiranthes annua Lesq. ex Brandeger & Coville; Neottia cernua (L.) Sw.; Gyrostachys cernua (L.) Kuntze; Gyrostachys constricta Small; Spiranthes constricta (Small) K.Schum.; Ibidium cernuum (L.) Bouse; Triorchis cernua (L.) Nieuwl.

= Spiranthes cernua =

Species of orchid

Spiranthes cernua, commonly called nodding lady's tresses, or nodding ladies' tresses, is a species of orchid occurring from Maritime Canada to the eastern and southern United States. As the common name suggests cernua means "nodding", or "bowed" in Latin.

== Description ==
Spiranthes cernua plants grow to 50 centimetres (20 in) tall. They have 1 to 5 narrow, basal, upright leaves, 2.6 centimetres (1.0 in) long and 2 centimetres (0.8 in) wide. The leaves are present during flowering but wilt afterwards. The white flowers are arranged in a spiral around the stem. Each flower is 6–12 millimetres (0.2–0.5 in) long and consists of 3 sepals and 3 petals, all curved forward to give the flower a long bell shape. Flowers are slightly to strongly nodding (hence the name), with older flowers usually nodding more than new ones. The dorsal sepal (the one at the top) is convex and recurved upwards towards the tip. The lip (bottom petal) curves strongly downwards towards its tip.

== Etymology ==
The genus name, Spiranthes, originated from the Greek words speira (coil) and anthos (flower), describing the spiral flowers common to the orchids in this group. Cernua is from the Greek word cernuus and refers to the drooping or bowing flowers.

== Distribution and habitat ==
The species is native in central and eastern North America, from Ontario and Quebec to the north, Nebraska to the west, Texas to the south, and Nova Scotia to the east. Spiranthes cernua grows in wet meadows, mossy seeps, maritime dune swallows, Sphagnum areas around pond and lake edges and along roadsides.

== Ecology ==
The orchid blooms in autumn, from August to November. Native bees, including bumblebees, feed on the nectar and pollinate the plant.

== Species complex ==
Before more recent identification of several separate species Spiranthes cernua had long been described as a species complex, exhibiting different morphologies throughout its range. Charles Sheviak, now retired curator of the New York State Museum Herbarium, explored this diversity in great detail, eventually describing Spiranthes magnicamporum to represent large, later-flowering individuals with tuberous roots from the Midwest. More recently, molecular and morphological work has recognized additional cryptic species in need of description; these newly recognized species are sometimes not closely related to S. cernua.

Broadly, the Spiranthes cernua species complex includes:

- Spiranthes arcisepala (split off as its own species in 2017)
- Spiranthes bightensis (split off as its own species in 2021)
- Spiranthes casei (described in 1975)
- Spiranthes cernua sensu stricto (the original species, described in 1817)
- Spiranthes incurva (re-established as separate species in 2017, ancient hybrid between S. cernua s.s. and S. magnicamporum)
- Spiranthes igniorchis (first described in 2017)
- Spiranthes longilabris (described in 1840)
- Spiranthes magnicamporum (split off in 1973)
- Spiranthes niklasii (described in 2017, ancient hybrid between S. cernua and S. ovalis)
- Spiranthes ochroleuca (described in 1932)
- Spiranthes ovalis (described in 1840)
- Spiranthes parksii (described in 1947, in genetic studies revealed to similar to S. cernua. Added to the endangered species list in 1982)
- Spiranthes sheviakii (described in 2021)
- Spiranthes triloba (re-described in 2016)
- Spiranthes × kapnosperia (hybrid between S. cernua and S. ochroleuca)

Spiranthes odorata was also formerly included in the cernua species complex but newer research shows it belonging to a different clade containing most of the remaining Eastern North American Spiranthes species.

== Cultivation ==
A commonly cultivated variety is Spiranthes cernua 'Chadds Ford', grown because of its larger flowers, ease of cultivation, and other merits. This cultivar is also often labelled as Spiranthes odorata however botanically it is neither but a third species called Spiranthes bightensis.
