= Logan's raid =

1791 mass killing of Indians by Kentucky militia in Ohio

Logan's Raid
- Part of the Northwest Indian War
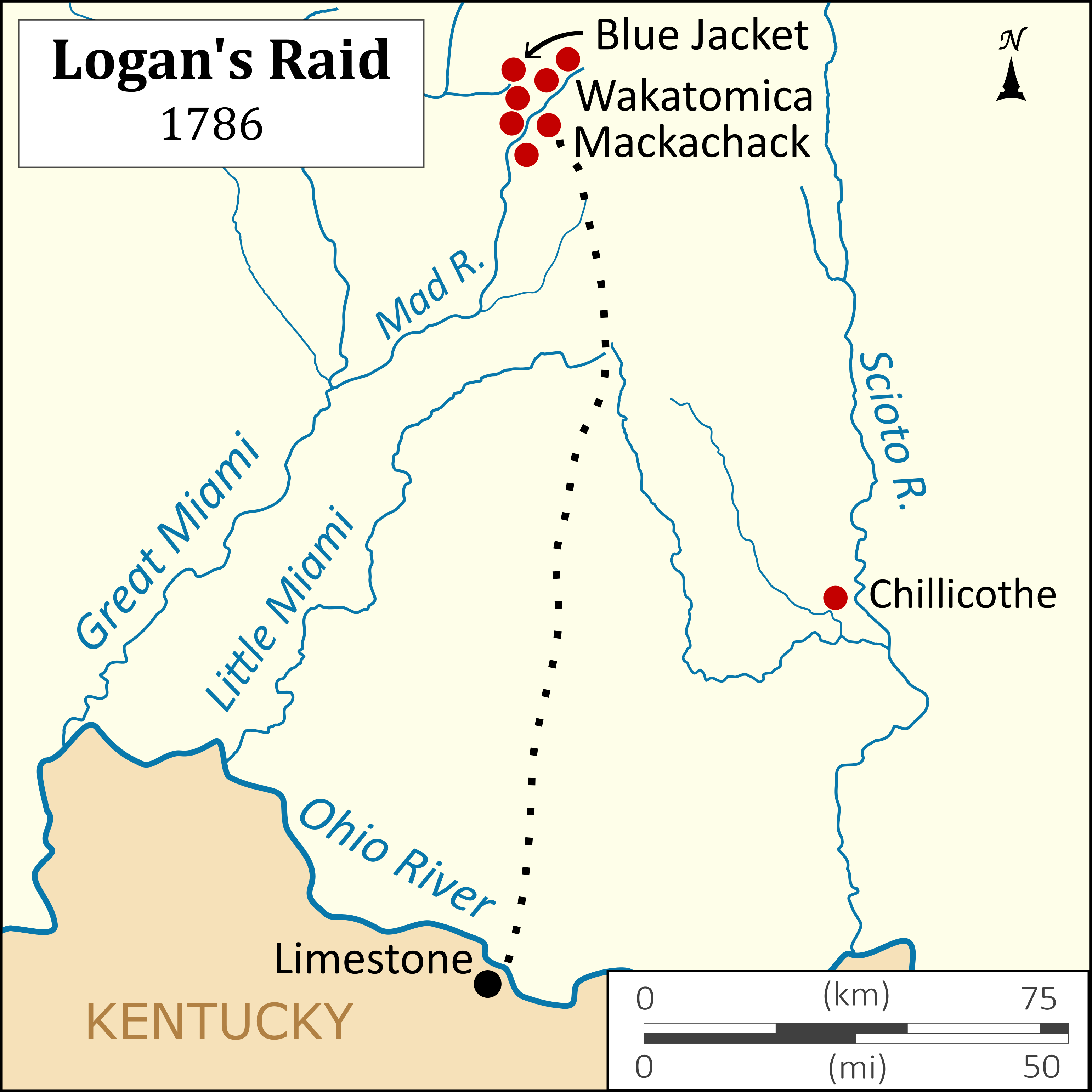
- Date: Oct. 12, 1786
- Attack type: Mass killing
- Deaths: 11 killed
- Perpetrator: Kentucky militia force under Colonel Benjamin Logan

Logan's raid was a military expedition held in October, 1786 by a Kentucky militia force under Colonel Benjamin Logan against several Shawnee settlements along the Little Miami and Mad Rivers in the Ohio Country. The villages were occupied primarily by noncombatants, since most warriors had left to defend the villages of Chief Little Turtle from a separate force moving up the Wabash River under the command of General George Rogers Clark. Logan seized and burned thirteen villages (full of mostly women and children), destroying the food supplies and killing or capturing many, including the aged Chief Moluntha who was soon murdered by one of Logan's men, reportedly in retaliation for the Battle of Blue Licks in the American Revolutionary War.

Moluntha had recently signed the Treaty of Fort Finney at the beginning of the year, and had raised an American flag over his lodge. When Logan's force attacked, he had calmly surrendered himself and his family, holding a copy of the treaty as a testament to his peaceful relationship with the United States. Militia Colonel Hugh McGary had participated in the Battle of Blue Licks in August 1782, and when the weak resistance offered by the Shawnee villagers had ended, he approached the elderly chief and asked if he had been present at the battle. "Moluntha had not been there, but he misunderstood the question and seemed to indicate otherwise. McGary, a hotheaded soldier whose irresponsibility had been a cause of that defeat, angrily felled the old chief with a hatchet and, as he tried to regain his feet, killed him with a second blow and scalped him." Logan found none but old men, women and children in the towns; they made no resistance; the men were litteraly murdered. (Ensign Ebenezer Denna, First American Regiment.)

Logan's raid and the death of their chief angered the Shawnees, who retaliated by further increasing their attacks on the whites, escalating the war.
