= Nonhelema =

Shawnee leader and sister of Cornstalk (c. 1718–1786)

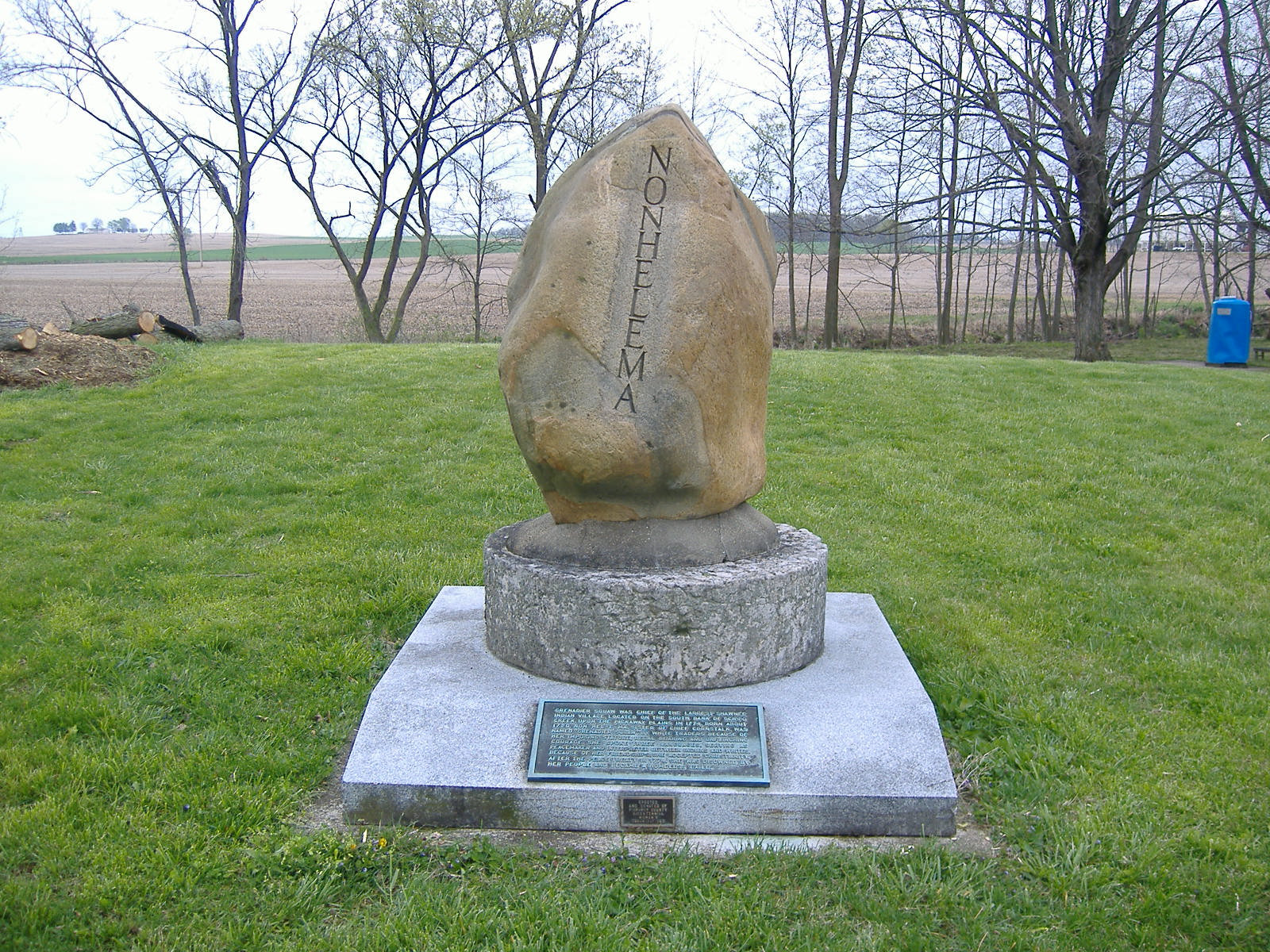
- Nonhelema monument

Shawnee leader

Personal details
- Born: 1718
- Died: December 1786 (aged 67–68)
- Spouse(s): Moluntha, others
- Relations: Sister of Cornstalk
- Children: 2, Thomas McKee and "Captain Butler" (or Tamanatha)
- Parent(s): Okowellos; Katee
- Nickname: "The Grenadier" or "The Grenadier Squaw"

Military service
- Battles/wars: Bushy Run

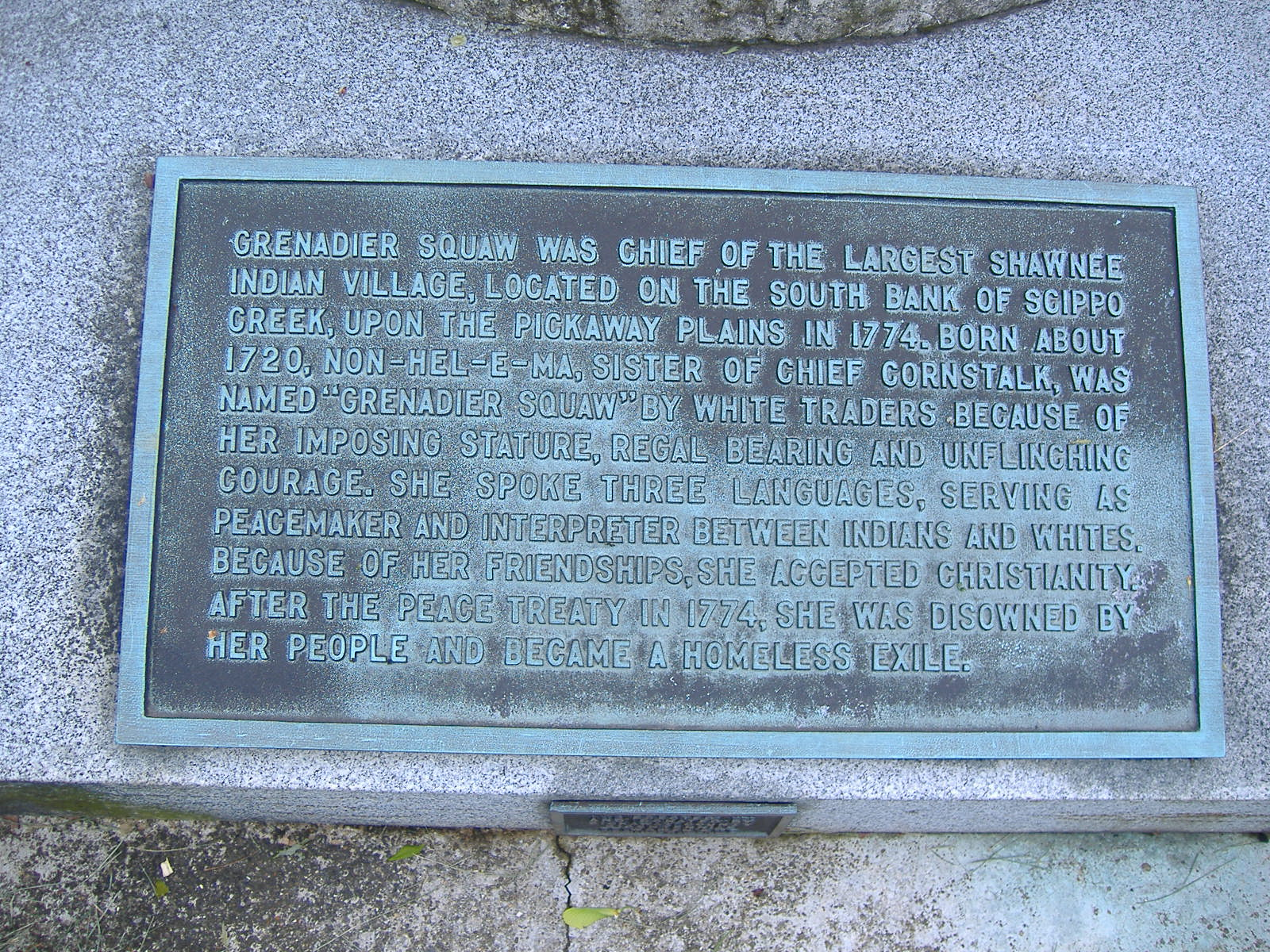
Nonhelema monument

Nonhelema Hokolesqua (c. 1718–1786) was an 18th-century Shawnee leader and sister of Cornstalk. She was a participant in Pontiac's War and advocated Shawnee neutrality during the American Revolutionary War. Following the war, and despite her support for the United States, Nonhelema's village was attacked. Her husband, Shawnee Chief Moluntha, was killed, and Nonhelema was captured and gravely injured. She died later that year.

== Life ==
Born in 1718 into the Chalakatha (Chilliothe) division of the Shawnee nation, she spent her early youth in Pennsylvania. Her brother Cornstalk, and her Métis mother Katee accompanied her father Okowellos to the Alabama country in 1725. Their family returned to Pennsylvania within five years. In 1734 she married her first husband, a Chalakatha chief. By 1750 Nonhelema was a Shawnee chief, having significant influence within the Shawnee settlement in Kentucky known as Lower Shawneetown.

Nonhelema had three husbands. The first was a Shawnee man. The third was Shawnee Chief Moluntha. She had a son, Thomas McKee, through her relationship with Indian agent Colonel Alexander McKee and another son, Captain Butler/Tamanatha, through her relationship with Colonel Richard Butler.

Nonhelema, known as a warrior, stood nearly six feet, six inches (198 cm). Some called her "The Grenadier" or "The Grenadier Squaw", due to the large height of 18th-century grenadiers. She was present at the Battle of Bushy Run in 1763. Nonhelema and Cornstalk supported neutrality when their land became the Western theater of the American Revolutionary War. In Summer 1777, Nonhelema warned Americans that parts of the Shawnee nation had traveled to Fort Detroit to join the British.

Despite Cornstalk's 1777 murder at Fort Randolph, Nonhelema continued to support the United States, warning both Fort Randolph and Fort Donnally of impending attacks. She dressed Phillip Hamman and John Pryor as natives so they could go the 160 miles to Fort Donnally to give warning. In retribution, her herds of cattle were destroyed. Nonhelema led her followers to the Coshocton area, near Lenape Chief White Eyes. In 1780, Nonhelema served as a guide and translator for Augustin de La Balme in his campaign to the Illinois country.

In 1785, Nonhelema petitioned Congress for a 1,000-acre grant in Ohio, as compensation for her services during the American Revolutionary War. Congress instead granted her a pension of daily rations, and an annual allotment of blankets and clothing.

Nonhelema and Moluntha were captured by General Benjamin Logan in 1786. Moluntha was killed by an American soldier, and Nonhelema was detained at Fort Pitt. While there, she helped compile a dictionary of Shawnee words. She was later released, but died in December 1786.

== Fictional depictions ==
Nonhelema is the subject of Warrior Woman, a 2003 novel authored by James Alexander Thom and Dark Rain Thom. She is portrayed by Karina Lombard in the November 2016 episode "Stranded" of the NBC TV series Timeless.
