= Blue Licks Battlefield State Resort Park =

State park in Kentucky, United States

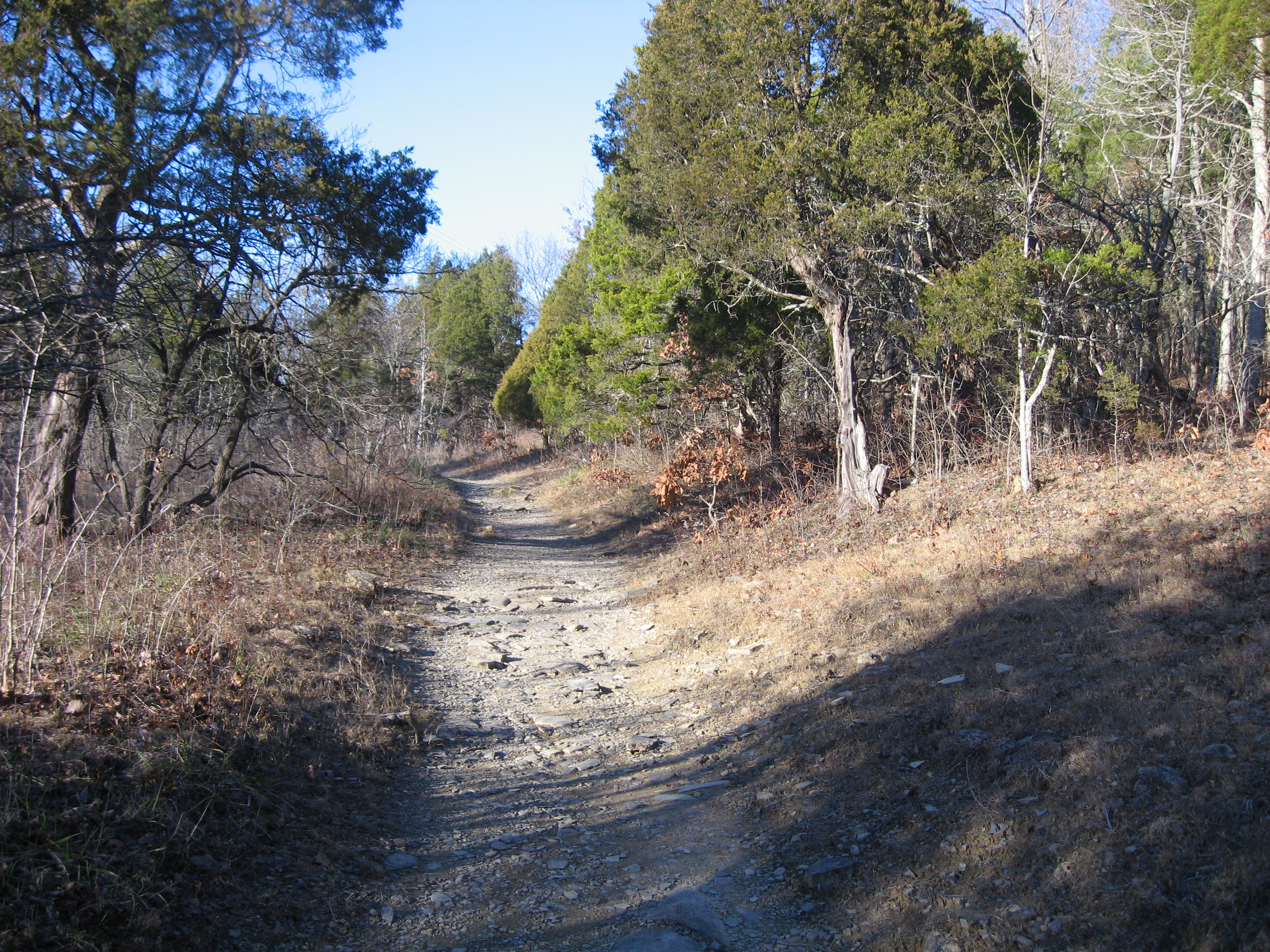
- An ancient Bison trail through one of the Blue Licks cedar glades

- Location within Kentucky Location within the United States
- Type: Kentucky State Park
- Coordinates: 38°25′42″N 83°59′41″W
- Area: 148 acres (60 ha)
- Elevation: 640 feet (200 m)
- Created: 1927
- Operator: Kentucky Department of Parks and the Kentucky State Nature Preserves Commission
- Open: Year-round
- Website: Official website

Blue Licks Battlefield State Resort Park is a park located near Mount Olivet, Kentucky in Robertson and Nicholas counties. The park encompasses 148 acres (60 ha) and features a monument commemorating the August 19, 1782 Battle of Blue Licks. The battle was regarded as the final battle of the American Revolutionary War.

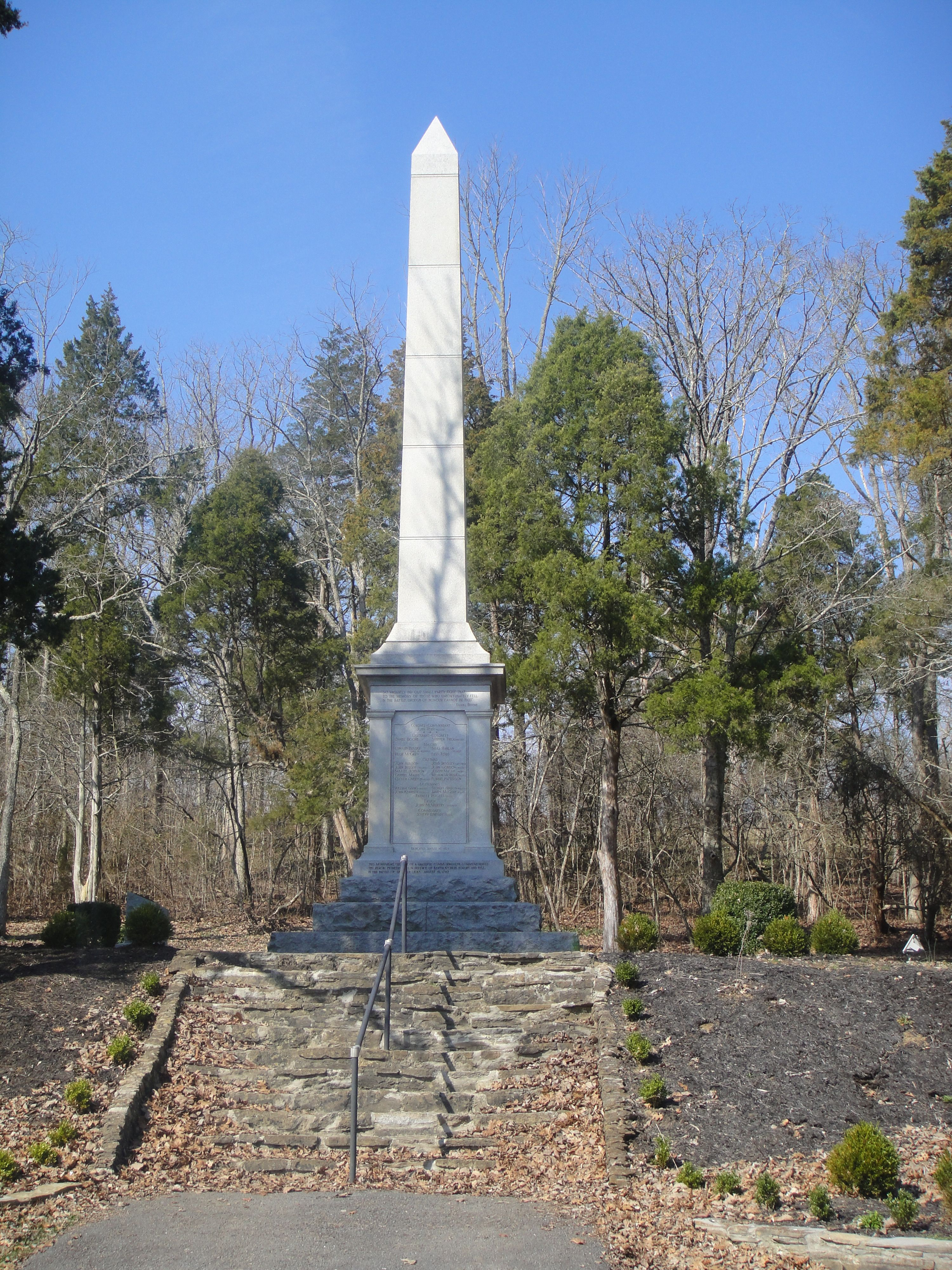
Monument at the Blue Licks Battlefield

== History ==
The earliest accounts of Blue Licks describe it as a place where animals gathered to lick the salt deposits flowing from the springs in the area. The Reverend James Smith provides this account in his 1795–97 diary:

As you approach the Licks, at the distance of 4 or 5 miles from it, you begin to perceive the change. The earth seems to be worn away; the roots of the trees lie naked and bare; the rocks, forsaken of the earth that once covered them, lie naked on the neighboring hills, and roads of an amazing size, in all directions, unite at the Licks, as their common center. Here immense herds of buffalo used formerly to meet and with their fighting, scraping etc., have worn away the ground to what it is at present.

In 1782, British Captain William Caldwell led a force of Indians against the small Kentucky settlement of Bryan's Station. Caldwell met stiff resistance, and after two days, retreated toward the Ohio River. The pioneers – Daniel Boone among them – were inclined to wait for reinforcements before pursuing the enemy, and although under the general leadership of Major John Todd, Major Hugh McGary of the Lincoln County contingent made a brash and fateful decision to pursue immediately (after an insult for being timid from Todd), engaging Caldwell at Blue Licks. In the battle that followed, 60 of the 176 men who followed McGary were killed, Boone's son Israel among them. Another 7 were captured. The survivors fled back to Bryan's Station and Lexington. Reinforcements under [Benjamin Logan] eventually arrived and buried the dead militiamen.

By the mid-19th century, the Blue Licks area had become a health resort, due in large part to the nearby saltwater springs that had been used for "salt making" since the 1770s. The mineral water found in the springs was rumored to cure everything from asthma to gout. By 1896, however, the area's last spring had gone dry. Efforts to locate another spring unearthed several geological and historical artifacts. A more extensive excavation of the area was conducted in 1945.

The battlefield was once on the National Register of Historic Places, but the National Park Service American Battlefield Protection Program determined in the 1990s that the site's integrity was too destroyed, causing the removal of the battlefield from the Register. However, a team from Morehead State University is to search the battlefield using modern equipment to explore for artifacts relating to the battlefields. Enough success in this endeavor could mean the return of the battlefield to the Register.

== Activities and amenities ==
The park is located along the Licking River, and offers canoeing and fishing. The Licking River Trail offers a one-mile (1.6 km) hike along the riverbank. Overnight stays are accommodated at the 32-room lodge or the 51-site campground.

=== State Nature Preserve ===
The park also features a 15-acre (6.1 ha) nature preserve containing a cedar glade, managed by the Office of Kentucky Nature Preserves. This glade was previously maintained as an open area by the large numbers of herbivores, such as bison, elk, and woolly mammoths who frequented the area. Today much of the glade has transitioned into forest, but the remnant areas are being maintained by controlled burns and removal of Eastern redcedar. These remnants are home to the federally endangered Short's goldenrod and the state threatened Great Plains Ladies'-tresses.

=== Pioneer Museum ===
The Pioneer Museum is the park's major attraction. It houses a variety of artifacts, from a mastodon tooth found during an excavation of the site to relics from the American Civil War. Exhibits focus on the area's natural and cultural history, including prehistoric animals and fossils, area Native Americans and 18th century pioneers, as well as a diorama of the battle. The museum was dedicated in 1931, saw renovations completed in 2007, and was closed for restoration as of 2014.

=== Events ===
The Battle of Blue Licks celebration is held annually in mid-August and features a re-enactment of the Battle of Blue Licks.

The Short's Goldenrod Festival—a celebration of one of the rarest plants in Kentucky and the United States—saw its 30th anniversary in 2006. It was held annually in the last week of September until 2008.
