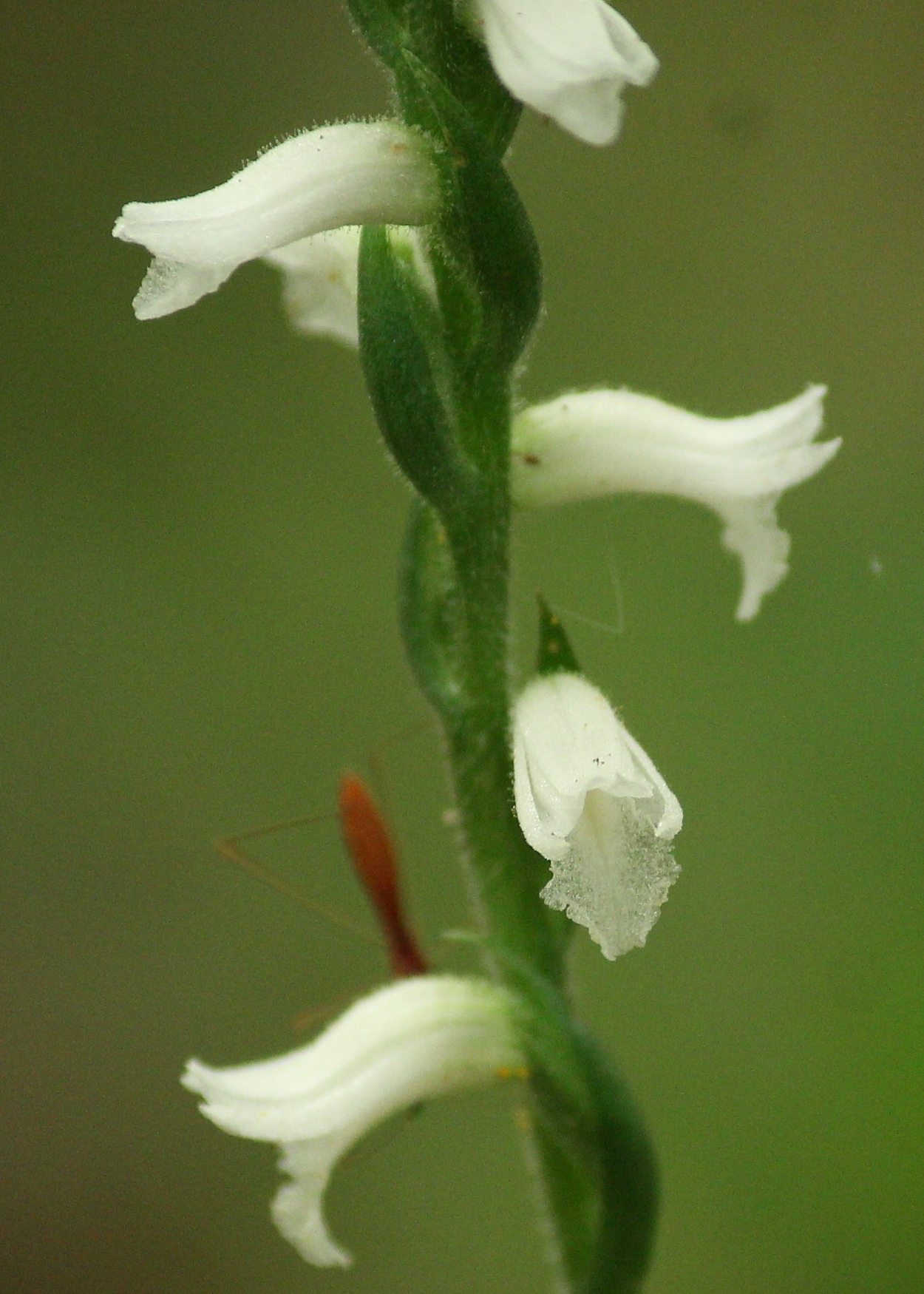

Conservation status
- Vulnerable (NatureServe)

Scientific classification
- Kingdom: Plantae
- Clade: Tracheophytes
- Clade: Angiosperms
- Clade: Monocots
- Order: Asparagales
- Family: Orchidaceae
- Subfamily: Orchidoideae
- Tribe: Cranichideae
- Genus: Spiranthes
- Species: S. niklasii

Binomial name
- Spiranthes niklasii M. C. Pace

= Spiranthes niklasii =

Species of orchid

Spiranthes niklasii, also known by the common name Niklas' ladies' tresses, is a terrestrial orchid nearly endemic to the Ouachita Mountains in Arkansas and Oklahoma with a few other known populations.

== Description ==
Spiranthes niklasii plants look very similar to Spiranthes cernua and an ancient hybrid origin between that and Spiranthes ovalis seems likely. They can grow to a height of up to 41 cm and have one or two basal leaves. Unlike either of the two parent species leaves usually wilt away by the time it has flowers. Another difference is that the labellum of each flower has a small patch of papillae (small protrusions) along its center.

== Distribution and habitat ==
The only known populations are in Arkansas and Oklahoma, mainly in the Ouachita Mountains. They grow in xeric graminoid clearings and forest edges.

== Taxonomy ==
Spiranthes niklasii was described as a new species by M. C. Pace in 2017. The name was chosen in honor of botanist Karl J. Niklas.
