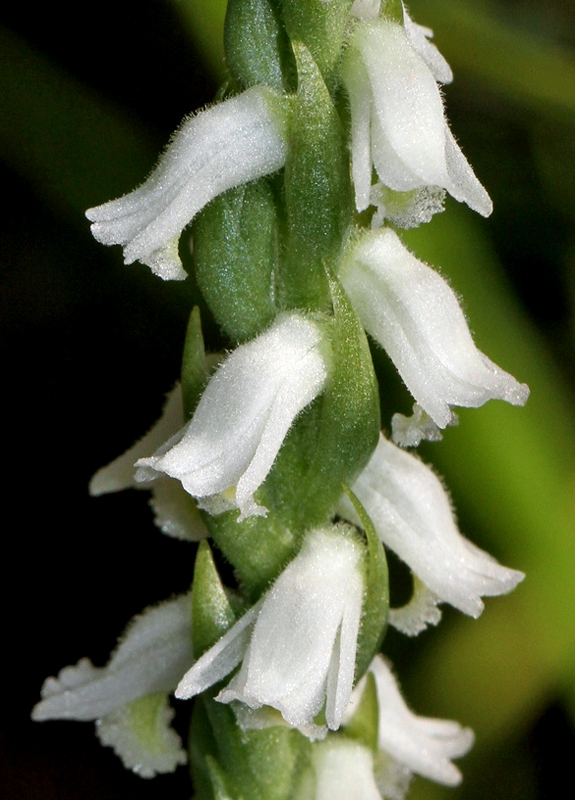
- Inflorescence

Scientific classification
- Kingdom: Plantae
- Clade: Tracheophytes
- Clade: Angiosperms
- Clade: Monocots
- Order: Asparagales
- Family: Orchidaceae
- Subfamily: Orchidoideae
- Tribe: Cranichideae
- Genus: Spiranthes
- Species: S. triloba

Binomial name
- Spiranthes triloba (Small) K. Schum.

Synonyms
- Gyrostachys triloba Small (basionym); Triorchis trilobus (Small) House; Spiranthes itchetuckneensis P.M.Br.

= Spiranthes triloba =

Panther ladies' tresses

Species of orchid

Spiranthes triloba, the panther ladies' tresses (previously sometimes green-lipped Spiranthes odorata) is a terrestrial orchid endemic to Florida.

== Description ==
Spiranthes triloba plants have up to 5 basal leaves that can sometimes be wilted by the time they are flowering. The flowers are white and fragrant and arranged in a spiral around the stem. The lip of each flower is green for newly opened flowers and changes to yellow over time. Bloom time is during winter, from October to February.

They look similar to Spiranthes odorata and Spiranthes cernua but the lip changing in color from green to yellow clearly distinguishes them from either. In fact locals in Florida long knew that there were Spiranthes odorata plants with this difference in appearance and called them green-lipped Spiranthes odorata.

The common name panther ladies' tresses is an homage to the Florida panther which is also endemic to Florida and lives in the same habitat as these flowers.

== Distribution and habitat ==
Spiranthes triloba is endemic to Florida and prefers frequently burned prairies. This habitat is distinct from that of Spiranthes odorata which prefers flooded forests.

== Taxonomy ==
The Spiranthes triloba plants were first described by John Kunkel Small in 1898 as Gyrostachys triloba and transferred to Spiranthes triloba by Karl Moritz Schumann in the same year. However, for the next 118 years Spiranthes triloba was rarely considered a separate species and included as a variation of Spiranthes cernua or Spiranthes odorata (which itself was often considered a variation of Spiranthes cernua). M. C. Pace conducted a phylogenetic and morphological study in 2016 and reinstantiated it as a separate species under Schumann's original name.
