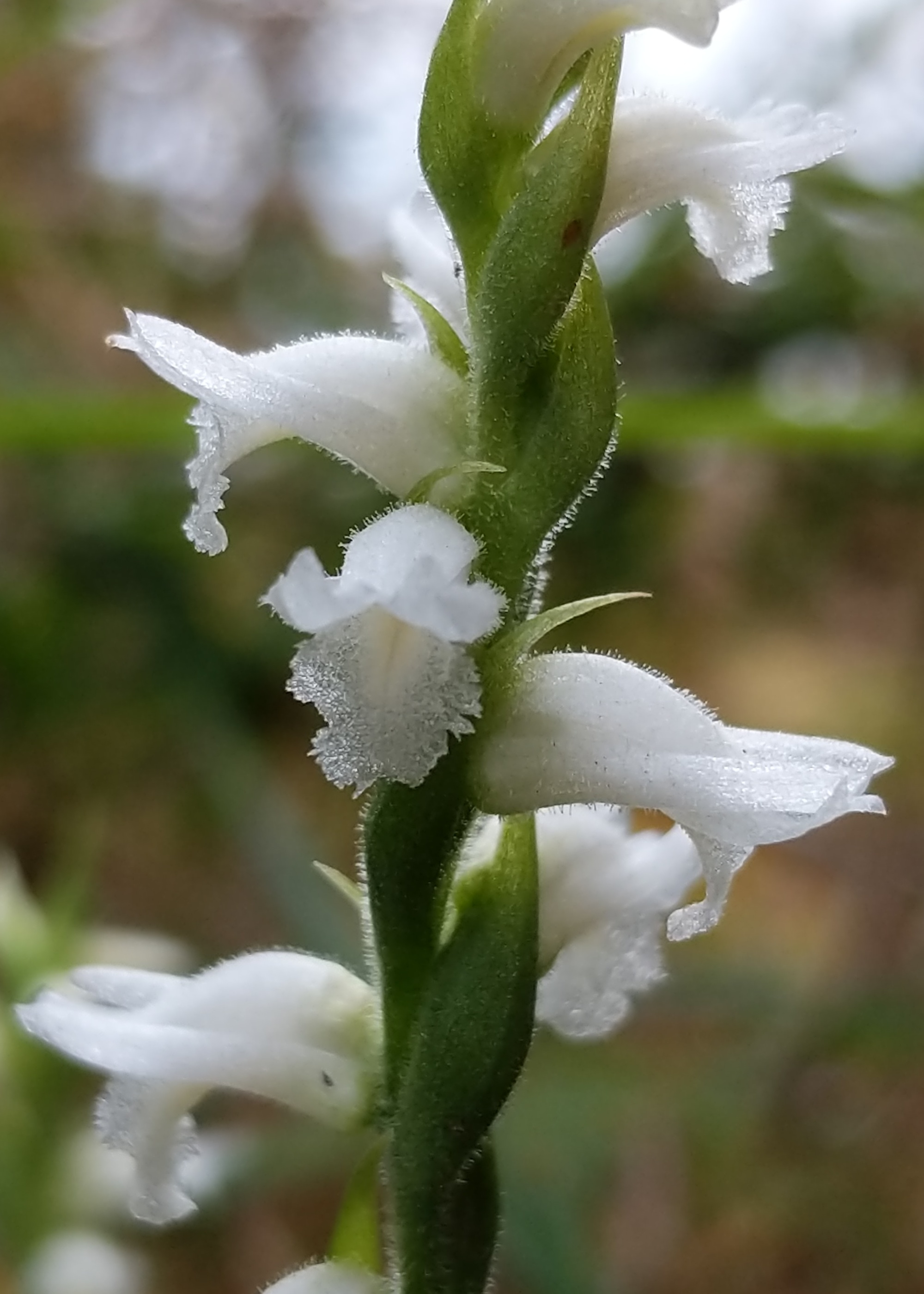

Scientific classification
- Kingdom: Plantae
- Clade: Tracheophytes
- Clade: Angiosperms
- Clade: Monocots
- Order: Asparagales
- Family: Orchidaceae
- Subfamily: Orchidoideae
- Tribe: Cranichideae
- Genus: Spiranthes
- Species: S. sheviakii

Binomial name
- Spiranthes sheviakii M.Hough & M.A.Young

= Spiranthes sheviakii =

Old field ladies' tresses

Species of orchid

Spiranthes sheviakii, the old field ladies' tresses, is a species of orchid growing in North America.

== Description ==
Spiranthes sheviakii reaches a height of 50cm. They have 1–4 leaves that usually persist through flowering (but may then soon start to wilt). The leaf shape is linear-lanceolate to oblanceolate, rarely obovate, 7–23 cm long and 1–2 cm wide. Flowers are arranged in a tight spiral around the stem and strongly nodding, with 3–4 flowers per cycle. Like all spiranthes each flower head has 3 sepals (with the dorsal sepal at the top) and 3 petals (with the labellum at the bottom). The sepals and petals are white to ivory with the labellum centrally yellowish. The tips of the lateral sepals are typically incurved over the top of the dorsal sepal and side petals.

They flower mid September to early October in the northern portion of their range and late September to late October in the southern portion.

Spiranthes sheviakii look similar to several other spiranthes species, in particular S. cernua and S. ochroleuca. The flowers of S. sheviakii appear more ivory than white compared to S. cernua though (hard to see in the field, but when compared side-by-side) and the labellum is more yellow. Under a hand lens the labellum of S. sheviakii also will reveal spherical glands on the underside while S. cernua has conical or flattened glands. Compared to S. ochroleuca the lateral sepals look different – they are straight with inward curved tips in S. sheviakii but falcate and not incurved in S. ochroleuca.

== Distribution and habitat ==
Spiranthes sheviakii have been found in New York, Ohio, Pennsylvania, Ontario, Michigan, Indiana and Illinois and likely also occur in Kentucky, Tennessee and Arkansas.

They prefer acidic, dry to mesic successional habitats, open barrens and old fields. They are also found in thickets undergoing succession to oak-hickory or mixed hardwood-pine forests.

== Taxonomy ==
Spiranthes sheviakii was first identified by Charles Sheviak (who it is named after) as his "old field ecotype" of S. cernua. In 2021 Michael Hough and M.A. Young described it as a new species and as a likely ancient hybrid of S. cernua and S. ochroleuca. This led to differing views among botanists as to whether the description as a new species makes sense, or whether it should be seen as a synonym to the modern hybrid with the same parents, Spiranthes × kapnosperia.
