= Hugh Wilson (American botanist) =

American botanist and plant taxonomist (1943–2018)

Hugh Daniel Wilson (August 15, 1943 – November 5, 2018) was an American botanist and plant taxonomist. He was a professor at Texas A&M University and was named a fellow of the American Association for the Advancement of Science.

== Biography ==
Wilson attended Alliance High School in Alliance, Ohio, where he ran track and played football. He attended college after serving for four years in the United States Air Force during the Vietnam War. He earned a bachelor's degree in biology and a master's degree in botany, both from Kent State University. He completed a Ph.D. in botany and anthropology from Indiana University Bloomington. He joined the faculty at Texas A&M University in 1977.

In 1980, he received the Edmund H. Fulling Award for the best oral presentation by an early-career scientist at the annual meeting of the Society for Economic Botany. By 1983, Wilson was studying the conditions that allow for the survival of Spiranthes parksii (Navasota lady's tresses), which was one of 12 endangered plants in Texas. Only 100 to 150 of these orchids had been identified, and they grew in southern Brazos County, Texas.

In 1994, when Upjohn was seeking approval for a type of genetically engineered squash, Wilson raised concern that the new disease-resistant squash might be able to crossbreed with other types of squash and produce superweeds.

Wilson was interested in the digitization of botanical data. With two colleagues in the late 1990s, he designed a website with photos and descriptions of East Texas flowers. The website was named a Coolest Science Site by the National Academy Press.

Wilson was named a fellow of the American Association for the Advancement of Science in 1990. He retired from Texas A&M in 2011 and died in 2018.
