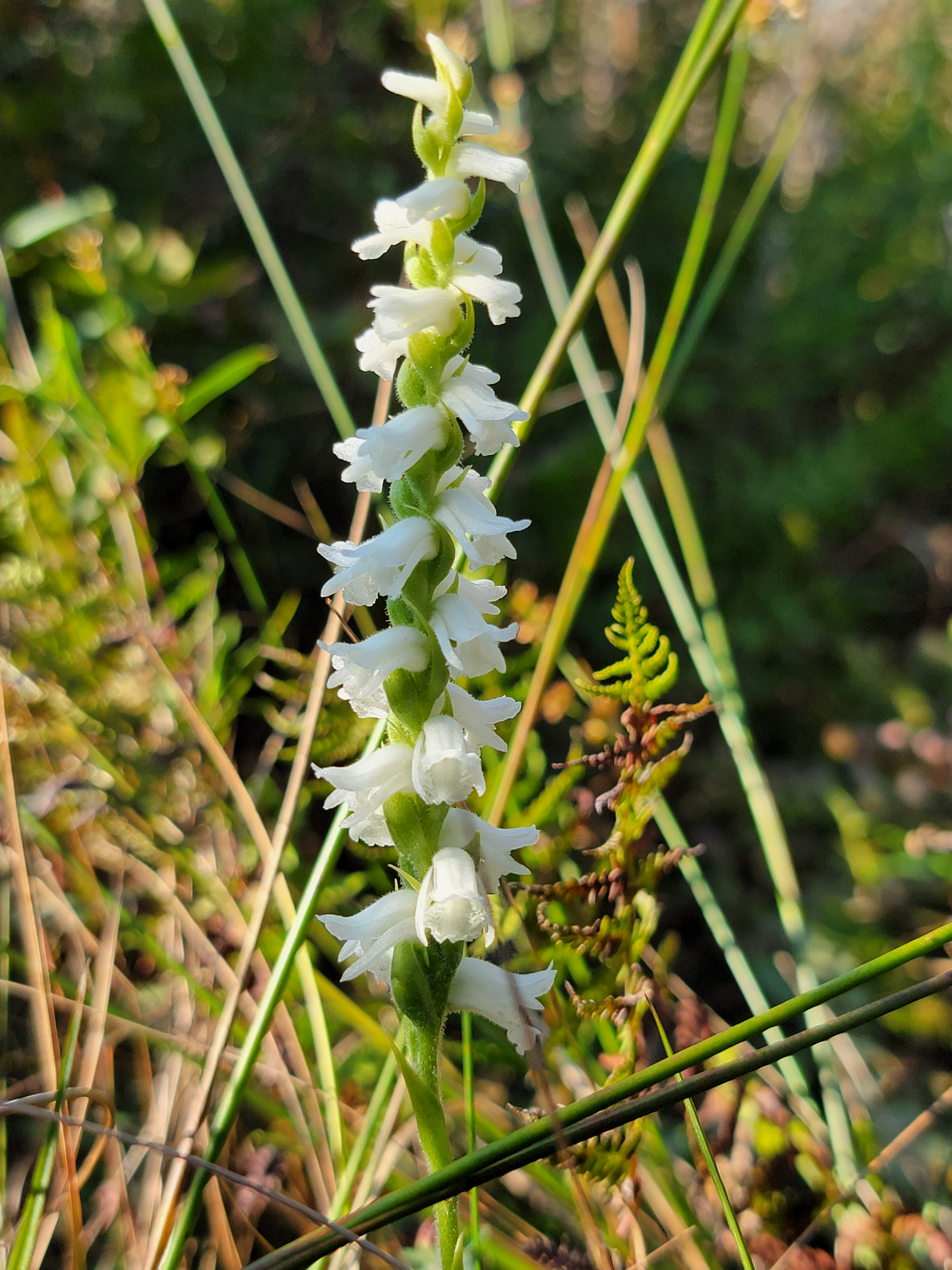

Scientific classification
- Kingdom: Plantae
- Clade: Tracheophytes
- Clade: Angiosperms
- Clade: Monocots
- Order: Asparagales
- Family: Orchidaceae
- Subfamily: Orchidoideae
- Tribe: Cranichideae
- Genus: Spiranthes
- Species: S. arcisepala

Binomial name
- Spiranthes arcisepala M.C.Pace

= Spiranthes arcisepala =

Species of orchid

Spiranthes arcisepala, the Appalachian ladies' tresses, is a species of flowering plant in the family Orchidaceae. This orchid is native to eastern North America. Long treated as part of Spiranthes cernua the species complex was reevaluated and Spiranthes arcisepala established as a separate species in 2017.

== Description ==
Spiranthes arcisepala is a terrestrial, perennial, deciduous herb. Like many other spiranthes orchids, it is acaulescent with one to four basal leaves persisting through anthesis (flowering). Flowers are arranged in a spike forming a spiral around the central stem with the plant reaching a height of up to 46 cm (18 in). Like all orchids the flowers have three petals and three sepals. The petals and sepals are both white and roughly 10 mm (0.4 in) long and, except for the lower petal or lip, less than 3 mm (0.1 in) wide. The flowers look very similar to Spiranthes incurva but the lateral sepals are bent downward with their tips often lower than the tip of the lip. This feature also gives them their scientific name "arcisepala" from Latin "arcus" (arching) and "sepalorum" (sepals) referring to the downward arching sepals.

== Distribution ==
Spiranthes arcisepala is primarily found across the Appalachian Mountains, from Nova Scotia south to western Virginia, with an extension into northern Ohio, Indiana, and southern Michigan.

== Habitat ==
Appalachian ladies' tresses are found in wet habitats like fens, bogs and seeps.
