= James Alexander Thom =

American author (1933–2023)

- Born: May 26, 1933
- Died: January 30, 2023 (aged 89)
- Education: Butler University (BA)
- Occupation: Author
- Spouse: Cody Sweet (m. 1975, divorced) Mari Silveus (m. 1984, divorced) Dark Rain (m. 1990)
- Writing career
- Genre: Western
- Website: www.jamesalexanderthom.com

James Alexander Craig Thom (May 26, 1933 – January 30, 2023) was an American author, best known for his works in the Western genre and colonial American history which are noted for their historical accuracy borne of his painstaking research. Thom graduated from Butler University in 1960 with a BA in Journalism after serving in the United States Marine Corps in the Korean War. He taught a course in journalism at Indiana University, and was a contributor to The Saturday Evening Post. His best known book is Follow the River, based on the Draper's Meadow massacre of 1755.

== Biography ==
James Thom was born May 28, 1933, in Gosport, Indiana, to Jay Webb and Julia Thom, both doctors. He is one of four siblings. He attended Arsenal Tech High School in Indianapolis, and was in the U.S. Marine Corps for three years (1953–1956) during the Korean War, becoming a sergeant. After the war he attended Butler University where he studied English and journalism, earning a BA degree in 1960. He was business editor of the Indianapolis Star (1960–1967), senior editor of the Saturday Evening Post (1967–1994), and was lecturer at Indiana University (1977–1981). In addition he contributed pieces to Reader's Digest, National Geographic, and Country Gentleman. He was an editor and contributing writer to Nuggets magazine.

He became a free-lance magazine writer and novelist in 1973. He wrote 11 unpublished novels before Spectator Sport, a novel about the tragic events of the 1973 Indianapolis 500, was finally accepted for publication in 1978. He then published his second novel Long Knife, a historical novel about George Rogers Clark, and it became a bestseller, cementing his career as a novelist. Thom's best known book is his third published novel, Follow the River (1981), about the 18th-century escape and journey of Mary Ingles, who had been captured by the Shawnee. It was by far his most successful, selling over 1 million copies and making the New York Times bestseller list. In all he wrote 10 novels, known for their historical accuracy. For example, he ate bugs, worms, bark and roots to understand how Mary Ingles in Follow the River survived. He wanted to immerse himself in the environment of the stories he wrote about. In the early 1980s, Thom restored a 1845 log cabin, where he would live for the rest of his life. He purchased the cabin from a widower and dismantled and rebuilt it at a new location using early 19th century hand tools. "Everything you do is research," he said. "The more you live and learn, the better you can write."

He spent years with a tribe of Shawnee to learn about Tecumseh for his novel Panther in the Sky. It was through this that he would come to meet his future wife, Dark Rain. They were married in 1990, she is co-author with Thom of Warrior Woman, and The Shawnee: Kohkumthena's Grandchildren. His website describes her as the Water Panther Clan Mother of the East of the River Shawnee of Ohio. He was previously married to Cody Sweet (an international platform lecturer), May 16, 1975; and Mari Silveus (a writer), May 28, 1984.

Thom admired Kurt Vonnegut, and took up correspondence with him soon before Vonnegut's death. Both men were Indiana natives and war vets. In 2013, Thom was made an honorary board member of the Kurt Vonnegut Memorial Library in Indianapolis.

Thom won a Golden Spur Award from the Western Writers of America in 1989. He won a number of awards from the Indianapolis Public Library Foundation, including the Lifetime Achievement, and National Indiana Authors Award.

Thom died on January 30, 2023, at the age of 89. His archives are held at Indiana University.

== Works ==
=== Nonfiction ===
- Let the Sunshine In (a collection of essays) (Gibson Publishing, 1976)
- The Spirit of the Place: Indiana Hill Country, photographs by Darryl L. Jones, Indiana University Press (Bloomington, IN), 1995.
- Indiana II, Graphic Arts Center (Portland, OR), 1996.
- The Art and Craft of Writing Historical Fiction (Writer’s Digest Books, 2010)

=== Fiction ===
- Spectator Sport (a novel about the tragic events of the 1973 Indianapolis 500 auto race) (1978)
- Long Knife (a novelized biography of General George Rogers Clark, victor of the Battle of Fort Sackville in Vincennes, Indiana, and conqueror of the Northwest Territory) (Avon, 1979)
- Follow the River (based on the Draper's Meadow massacre of 1755) (Ballantine Books, 1981)
- From Sea to Shining Sea (a novelized biography based on the lives of the John and Ann Rogers Clark family, their 10 children which included brothers General George Rogers Clark and Captain William Clark of the Lewis and Clark Expedition to the Pacific) (Villard Books, 1984)
- Staying Out of Hell (Ballantine Books, 1985)
- Panther in the Sky (a novelized biography of Tecumseh, the Shawnee Indian chieftain) (Ballantine Books, 1989)
- The Children of First Man (a novelization of the Welsh prince Madoc and the genesis and the demise of the Mandan Indian Tribe) (Fawcett, 1994)
- Red Heart (a novelization of the abduction and life of Frances Slocum in 1778) (Random House, 1997)
- Sign Talker (a novelized biography of George Drouillard, who was with Lewis and Clark and the Corps of Discovery expedition) (Ballantine Books, 2000)
- Warrior Woman (with Dark Rain Thom, a novel about the life of Shawnee peace chief Nonhelema, born ca. 1720) (Random House, 2003)
- St. Patrick's Battalion (a novel about Saint Patrick's Battalion in the Mexican–American War of 1846) (Ballantine Books, 2006)
- Fire in the Water (Blue River Press, 2016)

== Film adaptations ==
- Follow the River (1995), TV-movie based on the novel (ABC / Signboard Hill Productions)
- Tecumseh: The Last Warrior (1995), TV-movie based on Panther in the Sky (TNT / American Zoetrope)
