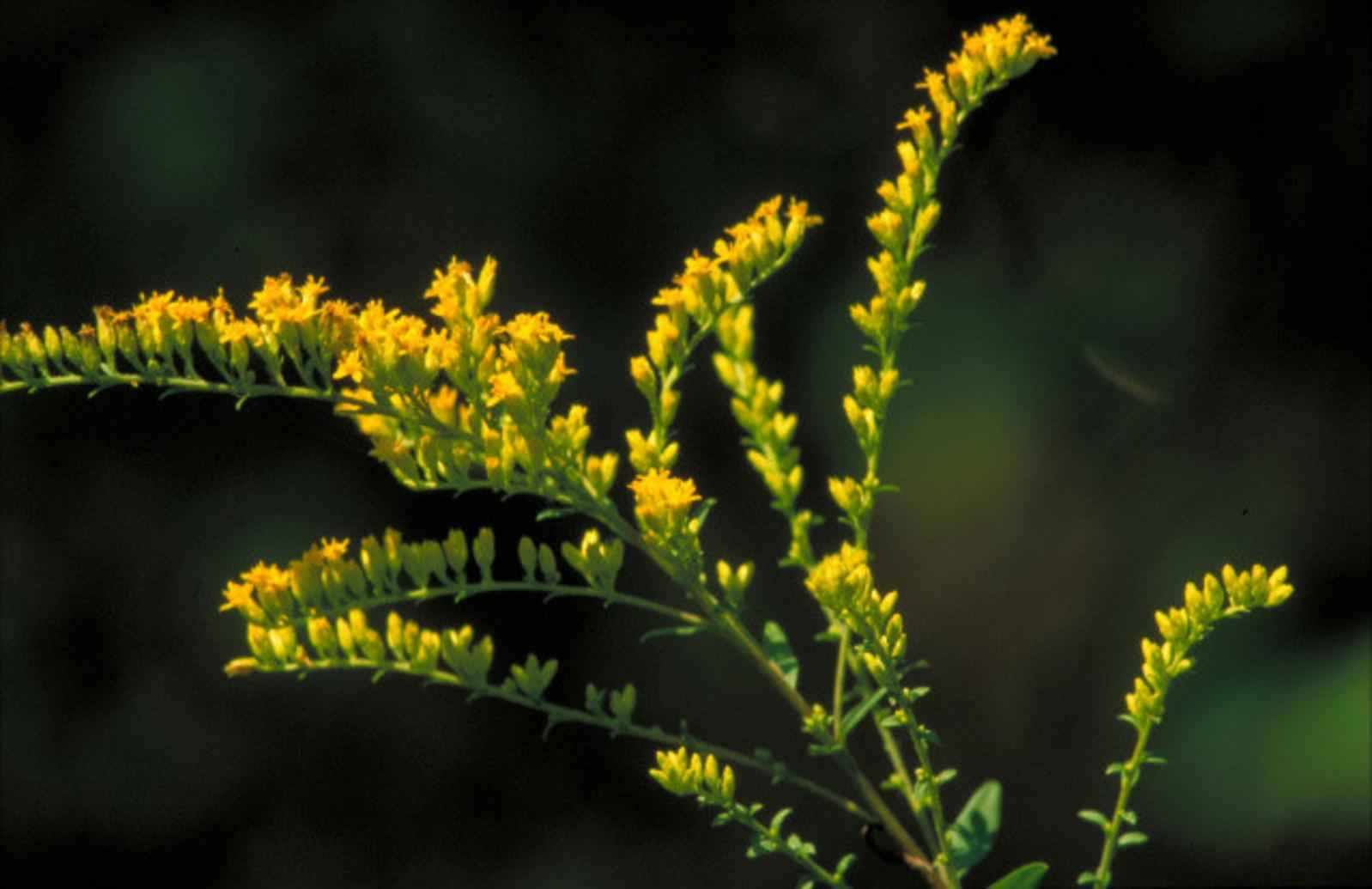

Conservation status
- Critically Imperiled (NatureServe)

Scientific classification
- Kingdom: Plantae
- Clade: Tracheophytes
- Clade: Angiosperms
- Clade: Eudicots
- Clade: Asterids
- Order: Asterales
- Family: Asteraceae
- Genus: Solidago
- Species: S. shortii

Binomial name
- Solidago shortii Torr. & Gray

Synonyms
- Aster rafinesquii Kuntze

= Solidago shortii =

Short's goldenrod

Species of flowering plant

Solidago shortii, commonly known as Short's goldenrod, is a species of goldenrod in the family Asteraceae. The only known populations of Short's goldenrod occur around the Blue Licks Battlefield State Park area of Kentucky and Harrison-Crawford State Forest in Indiana. It was listed on the Federal Register of Endangered Species on September 5, 1985, and was given a global rank of G1 (critically endangered) on February 29, 2000.

== Description ==
Short's goldenrod is a rhizomatous perennial. It reaches heights of 60–75 cm (1.97–2.46 ft) and has leaves measuring 5–10 cm (2.0–3.9 in) long and 5–12 mm (0.20–0.47 in) wide. It produces yellow flowers from mid-August to November, releasing seeds from late September to late November.

Short's goldenrod reproduces vegetatively by rhizomes and sexually by seeds. Plants are incapable of self-pollination and because the vegetatively produced clones spread out, it is difficult to exactly estimate the number of true individuals in a population. The goldenrod soldier beetle plays an important role in cross pollination, and bison may have been important in distributing seeds at one time. Unlike other goldenrod species, Short's goldenrod does not appear to spread via wind distribution of seeds.

Short's goldenrod differs from the more common goldenrod Solidago altissima by being shorter and spreading more slowly (whether vegetatively or by seed). However, where it is established, Short's goldenrod is more drought-tolerant. A number of sites have existed for at least 50 years.

Plants are upright to ascending, growing 60 to 130 cm tall with single stems or as clumps with 10 or more stems. They are produced from short, somewhat woody rhizomes. Plants produce basal leaves early in the growing season that wither away before flowering, and many mid- and distally produced stem leaves. Typically the lower third of the cauline or stem leaves wither away also before flowering. The short, firm cauline leaves are subsessile or obscurely petiolated with narrowly elliptic to lanceolate blades, with three nerves and distally serrate margins. Plants flower in August and October with 50 to 150 heads of flowers per flowering branch. The inflorescences are paniculiformly shaped with recurved branches on short sparsely strigose peduncles, 0.5–3 mm long. The bracteoles are very small and linear in shape. The flower involucres are narrowly campanulate in shape and 4–5 mm long. Phyllaries are unequal, in 3–4 series, both lanceolate to linear lanceolate in shape. Each flower head has 5 to 8 ray florets and 5 to 9 disc florets; the ray florets have laminae 2–3 mm long and 0.75 mm wide, and the disc florets have corollas 3–3.5 mm long. The seeds are produced in fruits called cypselae which are 2 mm long and have moderately short-strigose hairs. The fruits are topped with silky hair-like pappi 2–3 mm long.

== Habitat ==
Short's goldenrod grows best in shallow, clay soils with full sun or partial shade. Ideal areas include pastures, rock ledges, limestone and cedar glades, and openings in woods and forests such as those created by power line rights-of-way. Such openings are most likely to occur naturally as the result of vegetative disturbances such as fires or heavy animal grazing. Ideal growing conditions exist in populations of more than 300 healthy plants spread over 10 or more acres with buffering vegetation for at least 1.6 km (0.99 mi).

Significant areas of potential habitat for the plant were destroyed in the 1970s by construction of a new campground at Blue Licks Battlefield State Park. On December 16, 1981, a 6 ha (15 acre) tract of land was donated to the Kentucky State Nature Preserves Commission to create Blue Licks State Nature Preserve, an area dedicated to preserving Short's goldenrod. Additional tracts were dedicated on June 16, 1998, and March 7, 2000, respectively, bringing the total area of the preserve to 21 ha (53 acres). Today, the preserve hosts the Short's Goldenrod Festival; all proceeds from the festival fund efforts to preserve the plant.

== History ==
Short's goldenrod was first described by John Torrey and Samuel Frederick Gray in 1842. It was named for Dr. Charles Wilkins Short of Louisville, Kentucky, who discovered it growing on a limestone outcrop known as Rock Island in the Falls of the Ohio in 1840. It was last collected from that location in 1860, but might have continued to grow there had it not been for the alteration of the island effected by the construction of McAlpine Locks and Dam on the falls in the early 1900s. The species was considered extinct until ecologist E. Lucy Braun discovered a population near Blue Lick Springs in Kentucky in 1939. Later that year, numerous populations of Short's goldenrod were reported growing on rocky slopes and pastures in the area, but only three of those still exist.

In 1995, ecologists attempted to re-establish the species in Falls of the Ohio State Park by planting seven clumps of the goldenrod. Those clumps were wiped out by flooding within a year. Six years later, three of those ecologists discovered a wild population of the plant while conducting a botanical inventory of the Blue River watershed in Indiana. Prior to this, there were only five known natural populations of the plant; all were near the junction of Robertson, Nicholas, and Fleming counties in Kentucky, within a 2-mile (3.2 km) radius of Blue Licks Battlefield State Park. In 1989, the number of above-ground stems was listed at 73,620.
