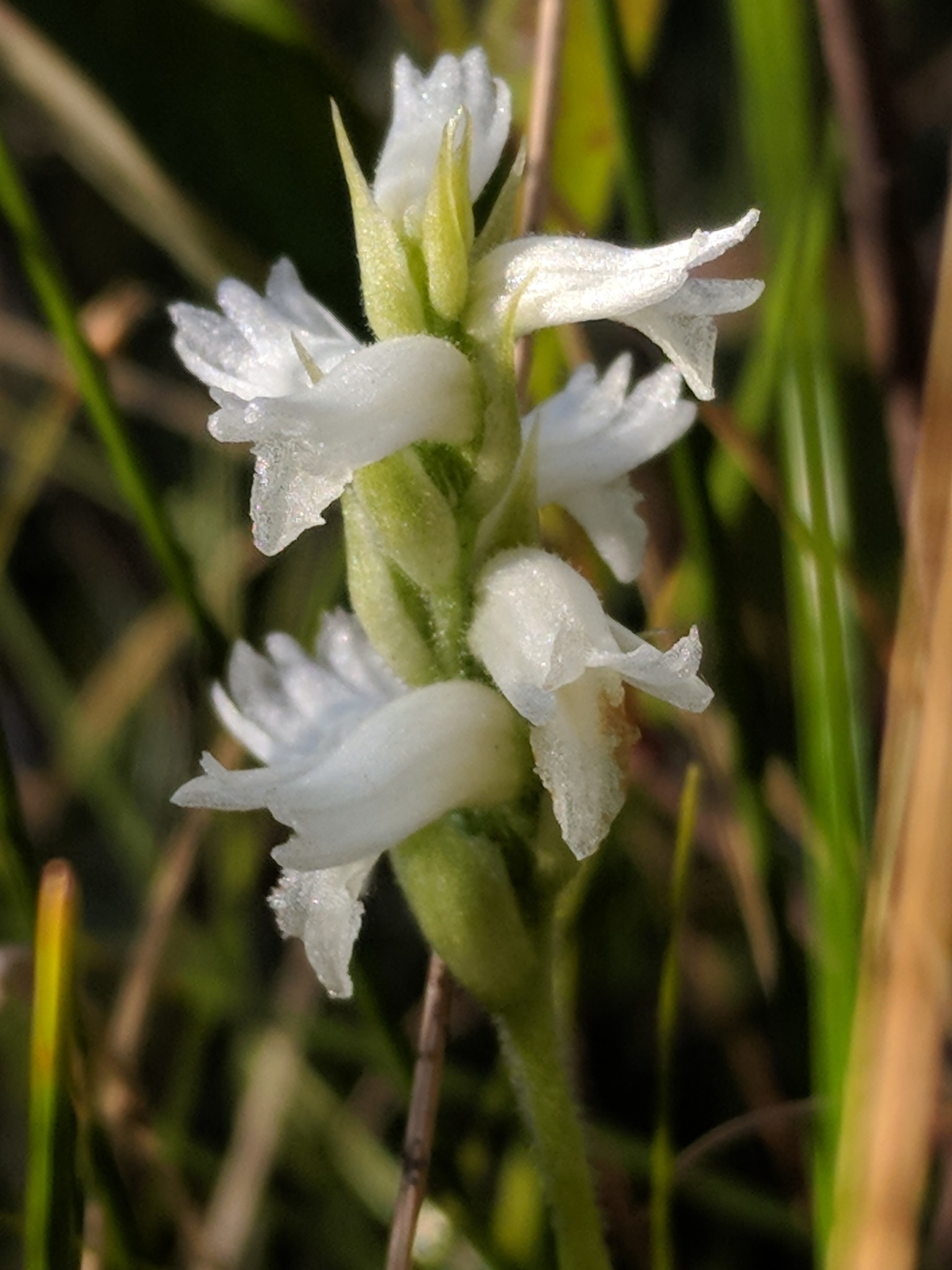
- In Schoolcraft County, Michigan

Scientific classification
- Kingdom: Plantae
- Clade: Embryophytes
- Clade: Tracheophytes
- Clade: Angiosperms
- Clade: Monocots
- Order: Asparagales
- Family: Orchidaceae
- Subfamily: Orchidoideae
- Tribe: Cranichideae
- Genus: Spiranthes
- Species: S. incurva

Binomial name
- Spiranthes incurva (Jenn.) M.C.Pace

Synonyms
- Ibidium incurvum Jenn.

= Spiranthes incurva =

Species of orchid

Spiranthes incurva, the Sphinx ladies' tresses, is a species of flowering plant in the family Orchidaceae. This orchid is native to the upper Midwest and Great Lakes Basin of North America. The species was originally described as Ibidium incurvum Jenn. in 1906. Long treated as part of a sensu lato Spiranthes cernua, the species complex was reevaluated and Spiranthes incurva reestablished as a separate species in 2017. Spiranthes incurva is an ancient natural hybrid of S. cernua sensu stricto and S. magnicamporum.
