= Battle of Blue Licks =

Battle in the American Revolutionary War

- Part of the American Revolutionary War
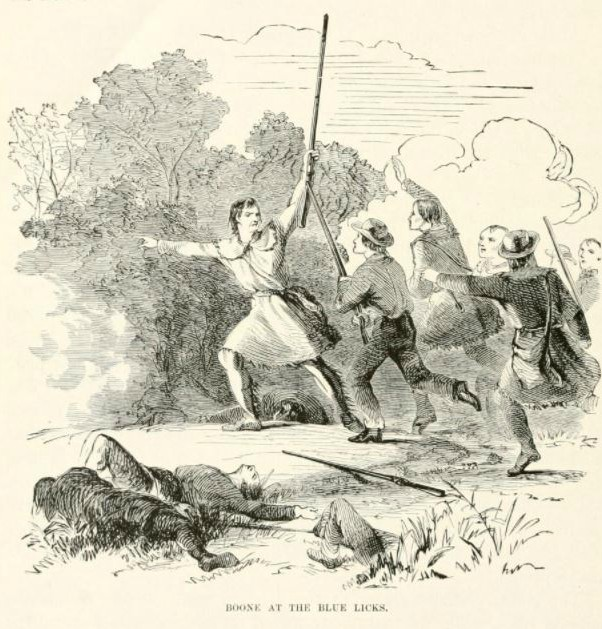
- Daniel Boone rallying his men during the battle
Date	August 19, 1782
Location	Kentucky County, Virginia 38°25′42.2682″N 83°59′40.73″W
Result	British-Indigenous victory

Belligerents
Great Britain; Shawnee; Mingo; Wyandot; Miami; Odawa; Ojibwe; Potawatomi	United States

Commanders and leaders
William Caldwell; Alexander McKee; Simon Girty	John Todd †; Stephen Trigg †; Daniel Boone; Hugh McGary

Strength
300 Indigenous; 50 provincials	182 militia

Casualties and losses
11 killed 14 wounded	77 killed 6 captured
- Location within Kentucky

The Battle of Blue Licks, fought on August 19, 1782, was one of the last battles of the American Revolutionary War. The battle occurred ten months after Lord Cornwallis's surrender at Yorktown, which had effectively ended the war in the east. On a hill next to the Licking River in what is now Robertson County, Kentucky (then Fayette County, Virginia), a force of 50 Butler's Rangers and 300 Indigenous warriors ambushed and routed 182 Kentucky militia, who were partially led by Daniel Boone, the famed frontiersman.

== Background ==
=== Caldwell's expedition ===
Although the Franco-American victory at the siege of Yorktown in October 1781 had ended major combat operations on the Eastern Seaboard, fighting on the western frontier continued. Aided by the British from Fort Detroit, Indigenous tribes living north of the Ohio River redoubled their efforts to drive American settlers out of Kentucky County, Virginia.

In July 1782, British Indian Department officials met with their Indigenous allies at the Shawnee village of Wakatomika near the headwaters of the Mad River. Members of the Shawnee, Mingo, Wyandot, Miami, Odawa, Ojibwe and Potawatomi tribes were in attendance. As a result, several hundred warriors and a company of Butler's Rangers led by Captain William Caldwell set out to attack Wheeling on the upper Ohio River. The expedition was called off two days later, when scouts reported that a force under George Rogers Clark, whom the Indigenous auxiliaries feared more than any other commander, was about to invade the Ohio Country. Caldwell's force returned to the Mad River to oppose the invasion, but the attack never came.

=== Bryan Station ===
A month later, Caldwell with his company of rangers crossed the Ohio River into Kentucky. With him were Alexander McKee and Simon Girty from the British Indian Department, and roughly 300 Indigenous warriors. Their intent was to surprise and destroy the settlement of Bryan Station near Lexington. The settlers, however, had been forewarned and took shelter within their stockade. Caldwell laid siege to Bryan Station beginning at dawn on August 15. Without artillery, he knew that taking the fort was unlikely, however, the crops around the stockade were destroyed, outlying buildings burned, and livestock slaughtered. Caldwell withdrew early on August 17, when he learned that reinforcements from the Kentucky militia were nearby.

The militia arrived at Bryan Station in the afternoon of August 18. The force included about 47 men from Fayette County and another 135 from Lincoln County. The highest-ranking officer, Colonel John Todd of Fayette County, was in overall command, assisted by Lieutenant Colonel Daniel Boone. Lieutenant Colonel Stephen Trigg and Major Hugh McGary led the Lincoln County contingent. Benjamin Logan, the colonel of the Lincoln militia, was still gathering men and had yet to arrive. The militia debated whether they should pursue the raiders immediately or wait for Logan to arrive with reinforcements. Boone advised waiting for Logan, who was only a day away, but others including Todd urged immediate action. Boone felt compelled to go along. The following morning the Kentucky militia set out in pursuit.

== Battle ==
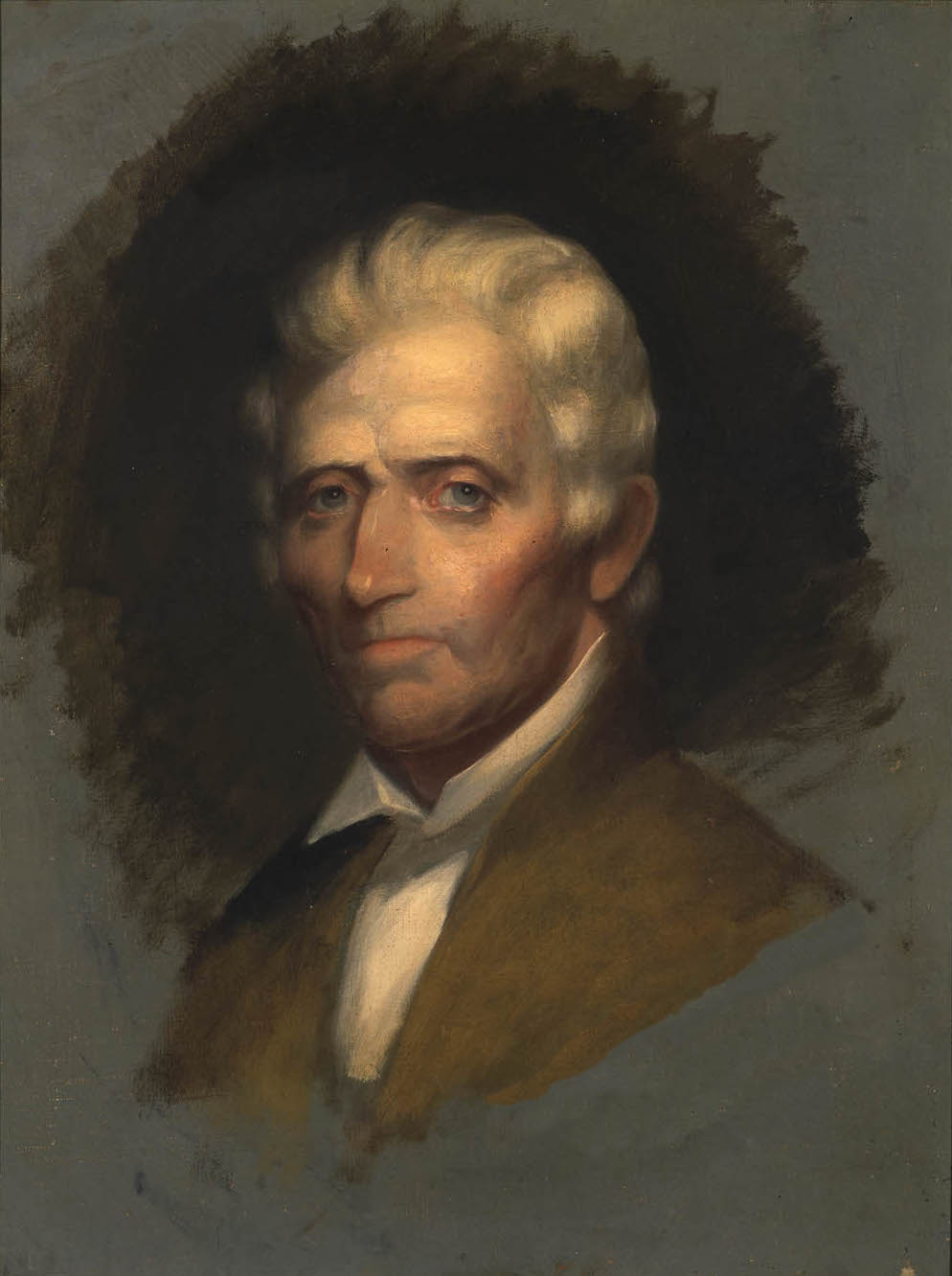
This 1820 oil painting by Chester Harding is the only portrait of Daniel Boone made from life.

On the morning of August 19, the Kentuckians reached a ford on the Licking River, near a spring and salt lick known as the Lower Blue Licks (today located in Nicholas County). A few Indigenous scouts were seen watching them from across the river. Behind the scouts was a hill around which the river looped. Todd called a council and asked Boone, the most experienced woodsman, what he thought. Boone said he was suspicious because of the obvious trail that had been left and signs that the warriors were attempting to conceal their numbers. He felt that the enemy was trying to lure them into an ambush. Hugh McGary, known as both a fierce fighter and an unstable hothead, urged immediate attack. When no one listened, he mounted his horse and rode across the ford, calling out, "Them that ain't cowards, follow me." The men immediately followed McGary, as did the officers, who hoped to restore order. Boone remarked, "We are all slaughtered men," and crossed the river.

The militia dismounted and formed a line of battle several rows deep. They advanced up the hill, Todd and McGary in the center, Trigg on the right, and Boone on the left. As Boone had suspected, the enemy was lying in wait, concealed in ravines. When the Kentuckians reached the summit, the warriors and rangers opened fire with devastating accuracy. Within five minutes, the center and right of the Kentuckians' line began to fall back. Only Boone's men on the left managed to push forward. Todd and Trigg, easy targets on horseback, were shot dead. The Kentuckians began to flee down the hill, fighting hand-to-hand with the warriors who had flanked them. McGary rode up to Boone and informed him that everyone was retreating and that Boone was in danger of being surrounded. Boone ordered his men to retreat. He grabbed a riderless horse and told his 23-year-old son, Israel Boone, to mount it. Israel suddenly fell to the ground, shot through the neck. Boone realized his son was dead, mounted the horse and joined in the retreat.

British and Indigenous casualties were negligible. One ranger and 10 warriors were killed with another 14 wounded. The Kentucky militia suffered 77 killed and 6 captured.

== Aftermath ==
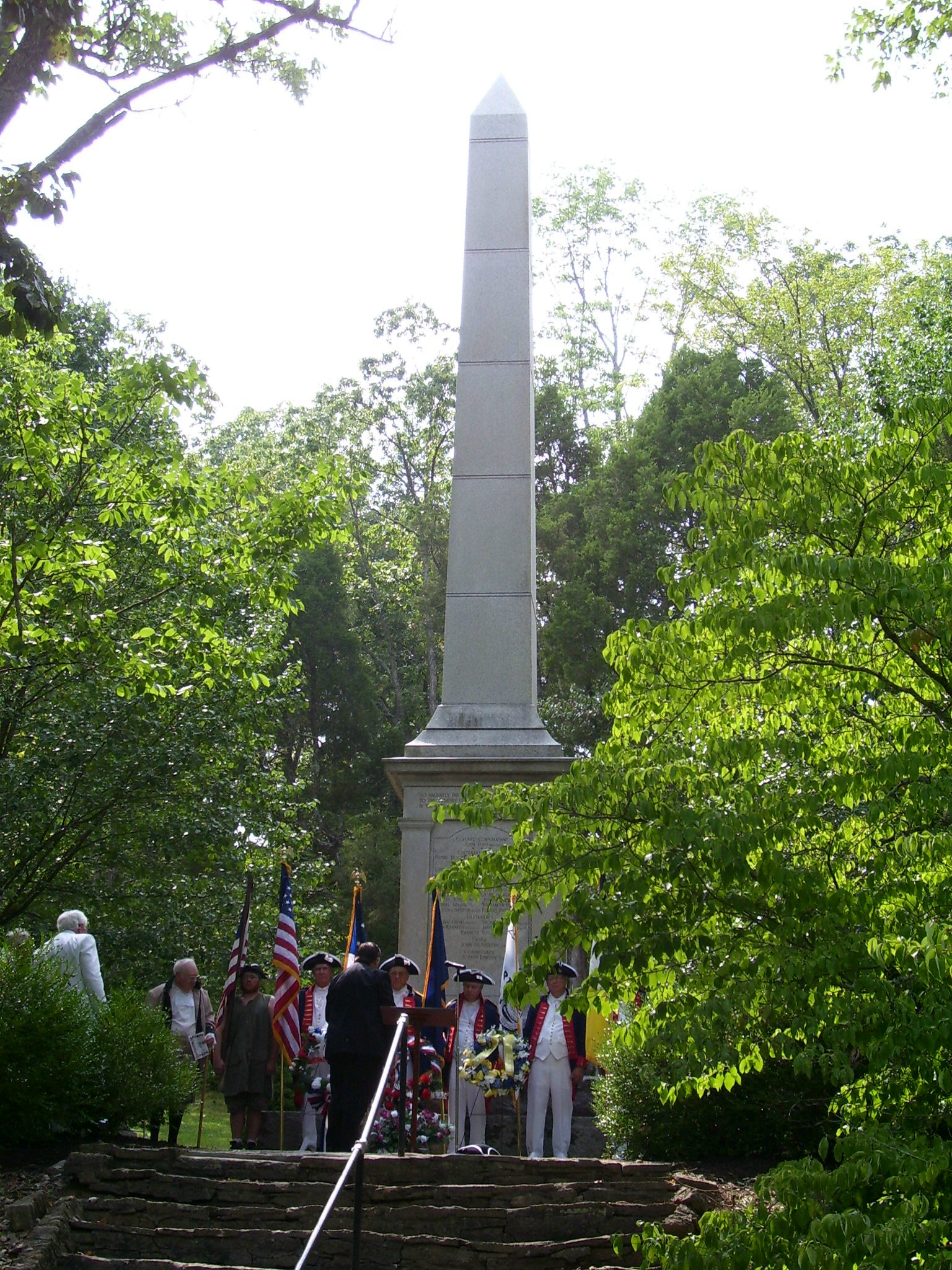
Monument at the Blue Licks Battlefield State Park, photographed in 2006 during a memorial service marking the 224th anniversary of the battle.

Simon Girty has been widely but erroneously credited with leading the Indigenous warriors at the Battle of Blue Licks. Girty, however, was subordinate to McKee, while Caldwell was in overall command.

Although he had not taken part in the battle, George Rogers Clark, as senior commander, was criticized for allowing the British-Indigenous force to penetrate so deeply into Kentucky. In response, Clark launched a retaliatory raid in November. His force consisted of more than 1,000 men, including Benjamin Logan and Daniel Boone. The Kentuckians destroyed five unoccupied Shawnee villages on the Great Miami River in the last major offensive of the American Revolution. Only minor skirmishing took place since the Shawnees refused to stand and fell back to their villages on the Mad River. In a letter dated November 27, 1782, Clark reported the Indigenous warriors had ten killed with seven captured and two whites retaken. His own loses were one killed and one wounded.

Four years later, the Indigenous villages on the Mad River would be destroyed by Logan at the outset of the Northwest Indian War. McGary, who accompanied Logan, confronted the Shawnee chief Moluntha and asked if he had been at Blue Licks. Moluntha misunderstood the question and nodded his head, and McGary killed him with a tomahawk. Moluntha had voluntarily surrendered when the Americans appeared, had hoisted an American flag, and held a copy of the peace treaty he had signed earlier that year in the belief that these actions would protect him. Logan immediately relieved McGary of his command and ordered him court-martialled for killing a prisoner. McGary was stripped of his commission for a year but otherwise went unpunished.

== Legacy ==
The Blue Licks battle site is commemorated at Blue Licks Battlefield State Resort Park, on U.S. Route 68 north of Carlisle, Kentucky. The site features a pioneer museum, the Worthington Lodge, the Hidden Waters Restaurant, and a 45-foot (13.7 metre) granite obelisk erected in 1928. Every year, on the third weekend of August, a reenactment and memorial service is held.

== See also ==
- List of battles fought in Kentucky
- American Revolutionary War § Stalemate in the North. Places the Battle of Blue Licks in overall sequence and strategic context.
- Station (frontier defensive structure)
