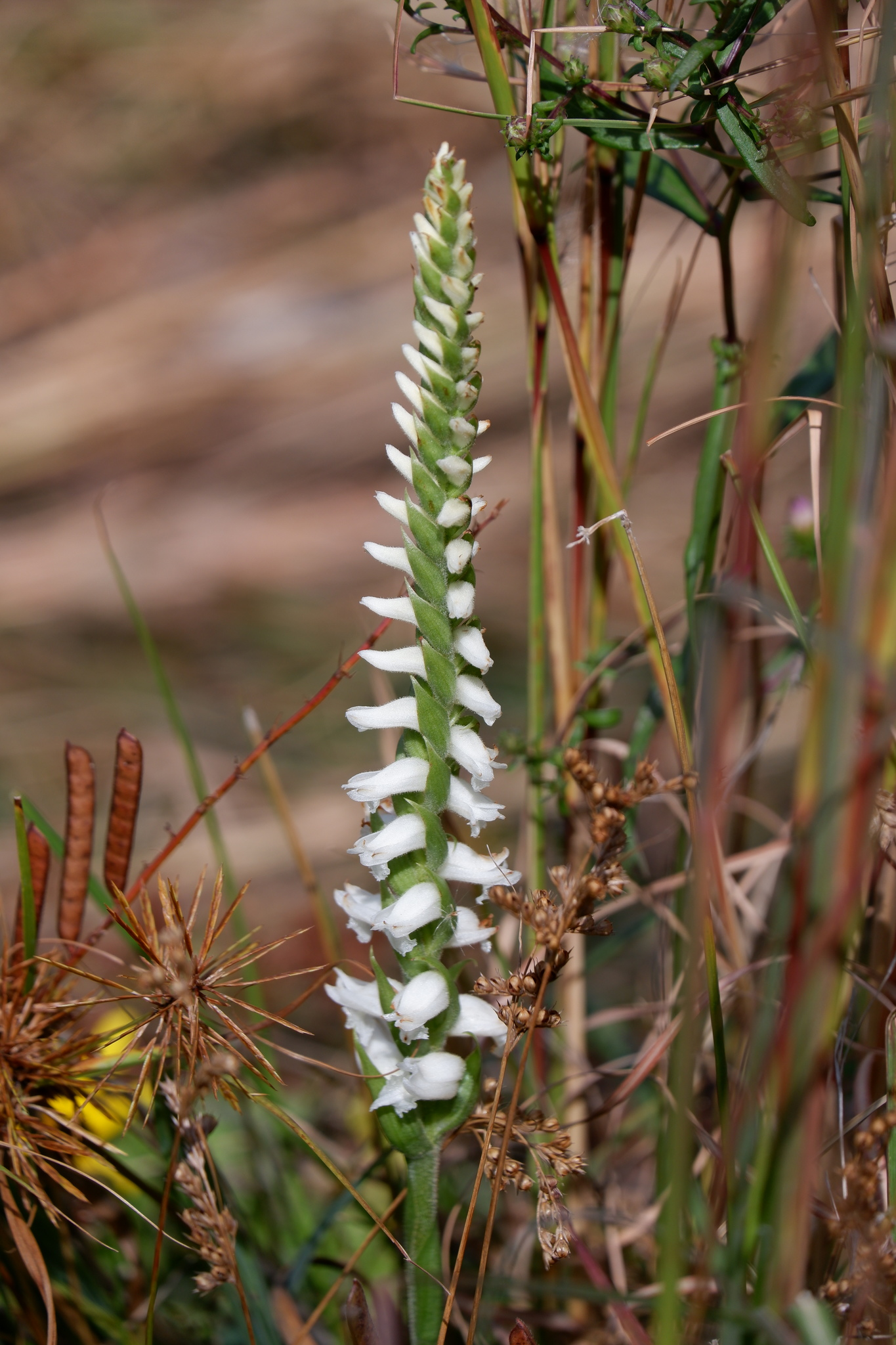

Scientific classification
- Kingdom: Plantae
- Clade: Tracheophytes
- Clade: Angiosperms
- Clade: Monocots
- Order: Asparagales
- Family: Orchidaceae
- Subfamily: Orchidoideae
- Tribe: Cranichideae
- Genus: Spiranthes
- Species: S. bightensis

Binomial name
- Spiranthes bightensis M. C. Pace

= Spiranthes bightensis =

Atlantic ladies tresses

Species of orchid

Spiranthes bightensis, the Atlantic ladies tresses, is a terrestrial orchid native to coasts of the north-eastern United States.

== Description ==
Spiranthes bightensis plants look similar to Spiranthes cernua and Spiranthes odorata. They are tall (up to 100 cm), with 1-5 basal leaves present at flowering time, and wider than those of Spiranthes cernua. The white flowers are arranged in a spiral around the stem. Spiranthes bightensis flowers are usually fragrant, while Spiranthes cernua ones are not.

== Distribution and habitat ==
Spiranthes bightensis is endemic to the eastern US Mid-Atlantic shoreline and the New York Bight. The species name bightensis derives from this bight. It occurs in Delaware, Maryland, New Jersey, New York and Virginia.

It prefers wet to moist meadows, coastal dune swales and sphagnum areas around water edges.

The southernmost edge of the range of Spiranthes bightensis is north of the range of Spiranthes odorata and the two ranges do not overlap. The range of Spiranthes bightensis does overlap that of Spiranthes cernua however plants do not normally co-occur at the same location.

A small population have turned up in Belgium, it is presumed they have escaped from cultivation.

== Taxonomy ==
Spiranthes bightensis is believed to be an ancient hybrid between Spiranthes cernua and Spiranthes odorata. M. C. Pace first described and published the plants in 2021. C. F. Austin collected several specimens in the 1800s and labelled them S. cernua var. gigantea but never published that name and later botanists who collected the plants usually labelled them as S. cernua.

== Cultivation ==
The Chadds Ford spiranthes cultivar, often sold as "Spiranthes cernua 'Chadds Ford'" or "Spiranthes cernua var. odorata 'Chadds Ford'" which had long been identified as belonging to Spiranthes cernua or Spiranthes odorata is actually neither of those and instead a cultivated version of Spiranthes bightensis.
