= Oregon, Kentucky =

Unincorporated community in Kentucky, US

- Unincorporated community
- Location within Kentucky Location within the United States
- Coordinates: 37°54′44″N 84°49′25″W
- Country: United States
- State: Kentucky
- County: Mercer
- Elevation: 522 ft (159 m)
- Time zone: UTC-5 (Eastern (EST))
  - Summer (DST): UTC-4 (EDT)
- GNIS feature ID: 499992

Oregon is an unincorporated community in Mercer County, Kentucky, in the United States. The community was originally founded as McGary's Station, named after Hugh McGary. Oregon was considered one of the area's centers of the hog trade by 1846.
