= Hugh McGary =

Kentucky frontiersman

Hugh McGary (1744 – 1806) was an Irish-born American military officer and landowner who was the founder of McGary Station in present-day Oregon, Kentucky.

== Early life ==
Hugh McGary was born in 1744 to John McGary and his wife Sarah in Ireland. The McGary family came to the British colonies in present-day America as indentured servants in 1750.

== McGary pioneers into Kentucky ==
In 1772, Hugh McGary, Samuel Tate, Benjamin Cutbeard, Daniel Boone, and two North Carolinians scout out land in Kentucky.

In August 1775, Hugh McGary, along with his new wife, the widow Mary Buntin Ray, and her sons William, James, and John Ray Jr., move to Kentucky with the twenty or thirty families that came with Daniel Boone on his second expedition to Boonesborough through the Cumberland Gap. Mary Buntin brought the first Bible into Kentucky. Hugh McGary was known for his fierce temper, which was an asset in battle, but being "void of humane and gentle qualities", McGary was "a quarrelsome and unpleasant man in civil life". Mary Buntin, however, was an equally strong-minded woman who "could manage McGary where a whole army couldn't."

While traveling north into the heartland of Kentucky, Daniel Boone's party traveled to Broadhead on the Dix River. While at Broadhead, Boone's party "bore a more northerly direction for Boonesboro while the McGary party went down to Dick's River. The party, consisting of the families of Hugh McGary, Richard Hogan, and Thomas Denton became hopelessly lost after leaving Boone's group."

Hugh McGary finally settles himself and his new family permanently around Fort Harrod in September 1775.

== McGary avenges his stepson's death ==
On March 6, 1777, while working in a field at Boonesborough, an African-American slave was murdered by Native Americans, and his owner was wounded. On the same day, near Harrodsburg, while William and James Ray, Thomas Shores, and William Coomes were clearing land and making maple sugar, they were attacked at Shawnee Springs in present-day Mercer County, Kentucky. 14 year old William Ray, McGary's stepson, was killed, but James Ray, the swiftest runner in the settlement, after killing the Shawnee native who killed his brother, ran to Fort Harrod for help. Coomes saved himself by hiding underneath a log. Hugh McGary was one of the members of a search party for the maple sugar makers, and he came across the mutilated body of William Ray, which was scalped by the Shawnee. Later, when Shawnee warriors were burning the cabins outside the Harrodsburg stockade, McGary rushed outside to drive them off. After a fierce fight, McGary and another man was wounded, but when McGary saw that one of the Shawnee natives was wearing the same hunting shirt his stepson owned, McGary killed that warrior, cut the Shawnee's body up, and then fed the bloody pieces to his dogs.

After William Ray was killed, Mary Buntin-Ray-McGary retired to her bed until she died in the spring of 1780. Mary was 39 years old. Mary was buried at the cemetery on the hill above Shawnee Springs in Mercer County, Kentucky.

== Hugh McGary Jr. is born ==
In 1778, Mary Buntin births him a son, whom they named Hugh McGary Jr. at McGary Station. Hugh McGary Jr. would eventually found Evansville, Indiana.

In 1780, after Mary Buntin dies, Hugh McGary remarries Catharine "Caty" Yocum, the daughter of Matthias Yocum. McGary yelled and fought with his new wife and with her brother.

In 1781, Hugh McGary is charged with the crime of "giving and accepting bets on popular Sunday horse races" in Mercer County, where he was found guilty and proclaimed by the court to be an "infamous gambler" and wasn't permitted to be eligible to serve any office "of trust or honor" in State of Virginia.

== Battle of Blue Licks ==
Hugh McGary was a Major with the Kentucky militia during the Battle of Blue Licks, fought on August 19, 1782, 10 months after the surrender of Lord Cornwallis at the Battle of Yorktown.

On a hill next to the Licking River in what is now Robertson County, Kentucky (but was then Kentucky County, Virginia), a force of about 50 British loyalists and Canadians, headed by Simon Girty, Alexander McKee, Matthew Elliot, and William Caldwell, along with 300 American Indians, made up of assorted Shawnees, Delawares, Mingos, Wyandots, Miamis, Ottawas, Ojibwas, and Potawatomis, ambushed and routed 182 Kentucky militiamen. The Kentucky militia had been following the British, Canadian, and Native American force following from their siege on Bryan's Station, when Daniel Boone grew increasingly suspicious of the obvious trail the Indians left. Boone suspected that the Indians were trying to lead them into an ambush.

Hugh McGary, known as a fierce Indian fighter, had urged immediate attack, feeling provoked after being overruled and called timid earlier by Colonel Todd. When no one listened to McGary, he mounted his horse and rode across the ford, calling out, "Them that ain't damned cowards, follow me, and I'll show you the Indians." The Kentuckians immediately followed Hugh McGary, as did the officers, who hoped to restore order. Boone remarked, "We are all slaughtered men," and crossed the river anyway.

== McGary acquires 1,280 acres of land ==
On January 13, 1783, Hugh McGary obtained 1,280 acres on Station Camp Creek. The large spring on that land was named McGary's Spring.

== McGary assassinates Moluntha ==
Moluntha had become the grand sachem of the Shawnee after Chief Cornstalk had been assassinated at Fort Randolph in 1777.

On October 6, 1786, Benjamin Logan and his 700 Kentucky militiamen arrived at Wakatomica. When the Kentucky militia arrived, old man Moluntha had the 13-striped American flag raised above his house, and he came out greeting Logan and his men while wearing a tri-corner "patriot hat" and holding the Treaty of Fort Finney in his hand. An earlier Shawnee runner had warned Moluntha of the invading army, and many in the village fled prior to Logan's army arriving, but since the signing of the Treaty of Fort Finney, Moluntha was not worried. Moluntha had been working with the Americans for months, which is why Benjamin Logan ordered his men not to lay a hand on Moluntha. At first, the Kentucky militiamen, which included Simon Kenton and Daniel Boone, were awed by the supreme confidence of Moluntha. As Hugh McGary walked towards Moluntha, Benjamin Logan ordered him to not "molest any of the prisoners". As McGary walked up to Moluntha and his wife, he asked, "Were you at the battle of Blue Licks?" Moluntha was nonchalantly cutting up a tobacco leaf in the palm of his hand, preparing to smoke a peace pipe with the Kentucky invaders, and he merely repeated the word, "Blue Licks!"

Moluntha's answer infuriated Hugh McGary, and McGary shouted, "I'll show you squaw play!", and swung a small "squaw hatchet" at Moluntha. In spite of General William Lytle attempting to stop Hugh McGary, the squaw hatchet buried into Moluntha's forehead, right between his eyes, with the first swing, dropping and killing Moluntha instantly. McGary cut Moluntha's head in two with the second swing. Hugh McGary then swung the "squaw hatchet" at Moluntha's wife, Nonhelema, cutting 3 of her fingers off.

General Lytle drew a knife in order to stab McGary, when Lytle was arrested by his men. Simon Kenton also had to be restrained to keep him from killing McGary too.

Hugh McGary was fired from his military command, court martialed, found guilty of murdering Moluntha, and was suspended for a year of "conduct unbecoming to the character of an officer and a gentlemen"

Tecumseh listed the assassination of Moluntha as one of the many broken promises by the United States.

== Hugh and Andrew Jackson ==
Hugh McGary gave testimony that he observed Andrew Jackson "bedding together" with Rachel Donelson-Robards in July 1790. Rachel had married Captain Lewis Robards of Harrodsburg, Kentucky without divorcing him. Jackson and Donelson would marry each other in 1794. Andrew Jackson's marriage to Donelson became a campaign issue in the presidential election of 1828.

Also in 1790, as a court record from Sumner County, Tennessee shows, a bill of sale was exchanged from Hugh McGary to Kasper Mansker for an African-American male slave.

== Later life ==
In 1797, Hugh McGary and his son Hugh McGary Jr. operate an inn, tannery, and a tavern together. In 1801, Hugh McGary gives Hugh McGary Jr. 222 acres of land in Hopkins County, Kentucky.

In 1804, Hugh McGary Sr. is living in Princeton, Indiana. His adjacent neighbor was General Robert Morgan Evans.

== Death and will ==
In 1806, Hugh McGary died. In May 1806, Hugh McGary's will was executed in Probate Court. Hugh divides his land between his 3 sons. Pertaining to his slaves, McGary writes: "...I also desire that my two Negro women, Tenar and Poll, bound to me by indenture, shall be the Slaves of my Wife Mary Ann during the term of seven years to assist in Supporting my young Family and at the Expiration of said term of seven years I desire that they shall be free, and their indentures given up to them, But if my Wife Mary Ann should not continue to hold possession of the land above mentioned and Support my young Family on the same, it is my will that she shall be deprived of all the benefits arising from, or interest in, said land, also of the two Negro Women Tenar and Poll, but the same shall be left to the discretion of my Executor."
