= Kentucky militia =

The Kentucky militia was a militia of what is now the U.S. state of Kentucky. It was formed in 1775 during the American Revolution. It mostly consisted of hunters and farmers. Members of the militia had a role in the formation of Kentucky as a state and the militia was maintained after statehood in 1792.

The Kentucky Militia fought in the Battle of Blue Licks on August 19, 1782, and lost 72 men in the battle.
