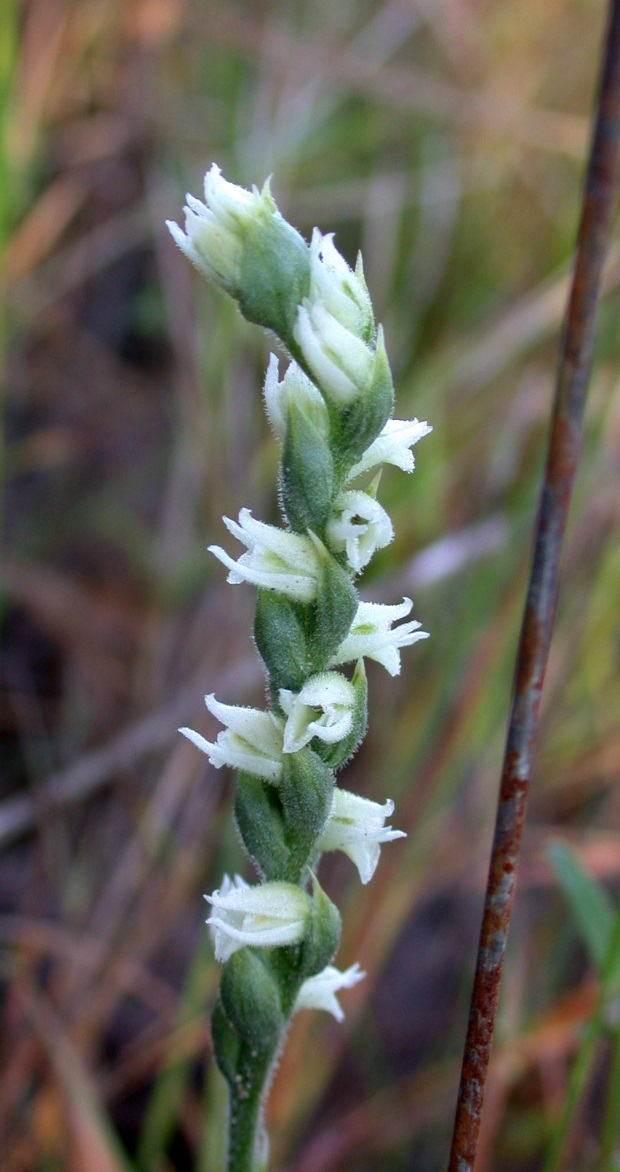

Conservation status
- Vulnerable (NatureServe)

Scientific classification
- Kingdom: Plantae
- Clade: Embryophytes
- Clade: Tracheophytes
- Clade: Spermatophytes
- Clade: Angiosperms
- Clade: Monocots
- Order: Asparagales
- Family: Orchidaceae
- Subfamily: Orchidoideae
- Tribe: Cranichideae
- Genus: Spiranthes
- Species: S. parksii

Binomial name
- Spiranthes parksii Correll
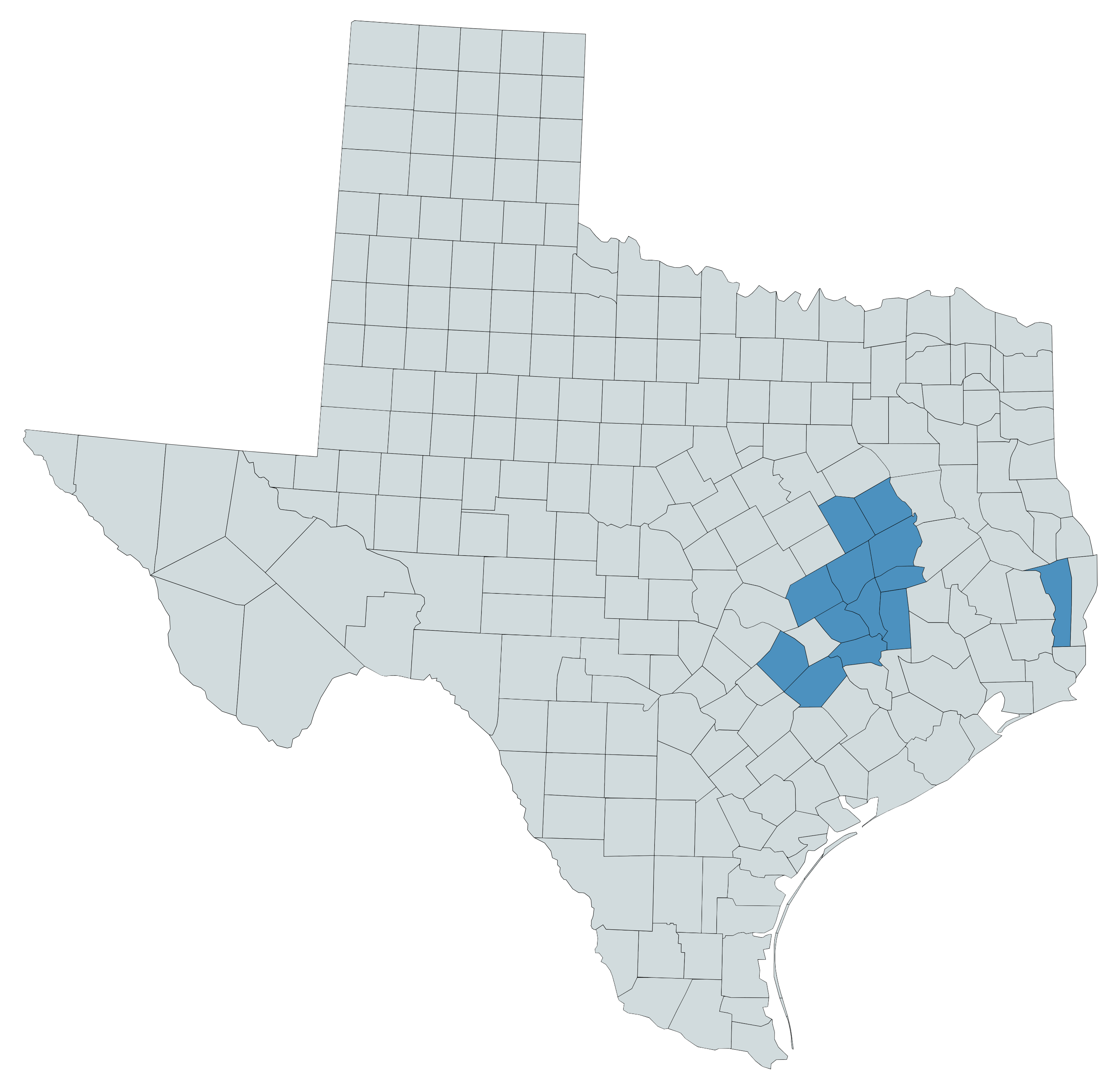
- Range of Spiranthes parksii

= Spiranthes parksii =

Species of orchid

Spiranthes parksii, the Navasota ladies' tresses, is a species of orchid that is endemic to Texas, United States. The flower was first discovered in 1945 and was first described by Donovan Stewart Correll in his 1950 book, Native Orchids of North America North of Mexico.

== Description ==
Spiranthes parksii is a slender-stemmed perennial, 8–15 inches (200–380 mm) tall. Leaves are long and thin and found mostly near the ground level, but usually disappear when the flower buds. Flowers petals are round or oval and off-white in color. The flowers typically spiral up the stem. Conspicuously white-tipped bracts occur underneath each 1/4-inch-long (6.4 mm) flower. The side petals have a green central stripe, and the lip (bottom petal) is distinctly ragged. It differs in appearance from the similar looking Spiranthes cernua with its white-tipped bracts near the flowers when in bloom.

== Habitat and range ==
Navasota ladies' tresses is primarily found in the East Central Texas forests, usually along creeks in the Brazos and Navasota River watersheds. In 1982, when the species was listed as endangered, only two populations were believed to exist, both in Brazos County. Since then, biologists have identified the species in Bastrop, Burleson, Fayette, Freestone, Grimes, Jasper, Leon, Madison, Milam, Robertson, and Washington Counties. The population in Jasper County is disjunct and the only one that occurs in the Piney Woods.

== Ecology ==
The orchid is most recognizable in bloom between October and December. It produces basal rosettes between September and May. The rosettes usually disappear by mid-May and they will survive underground as tuberous roots with no aboveground leaves, stems, or flowers.

== Scientific and Regulatory History ==
Two other ladies'-tresses are similar to Navasota ladies’-tresses and occur in an overlapping habitat, slender ladies’-tresses (Spiranthes lacera) and the nodding ladies’-tresses (Spiranthes cernua). Both of these species are secure in their abundance. In 2007 a genetic study found little genetic difference between S. cernua and S. parksii. However, Texas Parks and Wildlife found that although there are a lot of genetic similarities between the two, that S. parksii differs in morphological characteristics and is considered a derivative of the more widely distributed S. cernua complex. Therefore, the United States Fish and Wildlife Services elected to keep S. parksii on the endangered species list. Further research into the S. cernua complex also suggested evidence for more genetic differences, but testing is limited due to the vulnerable nature of S. parksii.

== Conservation ==
Navasota ladies' tresses was listed as an endangered species by the United States Fish and Wildlife Service (USFWS) in May 1982. The decline of the plant is mostly due to loss of habitat from human encroachment and activity.
