= Moluntha =

Moluntha, also spelled Molunthe, Melonthe, and Malunthy (d. 1786), was a prominent civil chief of the Shawnee people in the 1780s. He was murdered by a Kentucky soldier at the outset of the Northwest Indian War (1785–1795).

Moluntha belonged to the Mekoche division of the Shawnee tribe. In Moluntha's era, the Shawnee lived in autonomous villages with no central government, but in the 1760s, they began appointing a ceremonial leader from the Mekoche division to speak for them in negotiations with Europeans and Americans, who often mistook this leader as the Shawnee "principal chief" or "king." The first such ceremonial leader was Kisinoutha (also known as Hard Man or Kishshinottisthee). After Kisinoutha's death in 1780, Moluntha succeeded him as the Shawnee "principal chief" or ceremonial leader.

After the American Revolutionary War (1775–1783), the United States claimed the lands north of the Ohio River by right of conquest. In January 1786, Moluntha and other Mekoche leaders reluctantly signed the Treaty of Fort Finney, which surrendered most of Ohio to the Americans. The treaty failed to end the hostilities between the United States and the Natives of the Ohio Country, and most Shawnees rejected the treaty. After the treaty, Moluntha and other Shawnees sent a message to the British, their allies in the Revolutionary War, asking for help. "We have been cheated by the Americans, who are still striving to work our destruction, and without your assistance they may be able to accomplish their ends."

In October 1786, General Benjamin Logan led Kentucky militiamen on an expedition into Shawnee territory. On October 6, the Kentuckians attacked and burned seven Shawnee villages; killed 10 warriors; and took 32 prisoners, mostly women and children. Among the prisoners was the elderly Moluntha, who was flying an American flag and holding a copy of the Treaty of Fort Finney as proof of his friendship to the United States. Hugh McGary, a Kentucky soldier who was still bitter about the defeat at the Battle of Blue Licks in the Revolutionary War four years earlier, asked Moluntha if he had been at that battle. Moluntha had not been there but apparently misunderstood the question and answered in the affirmative. McGary immediately killed Moluntha with a tomahawk and scalped him. McGary was later court-martialed, found guilty of murdering Moluntha, and suspended from the militia for one year.

According to the historian Colin G. Calloway, "Any hope of real peace between the Shawnees and the Americans died with Moluntha." In 1810, Tecumseh cited Moluntha's death as an example of why the Shawnees could not trust the United States.
