= Benjamin Logan =

American politician

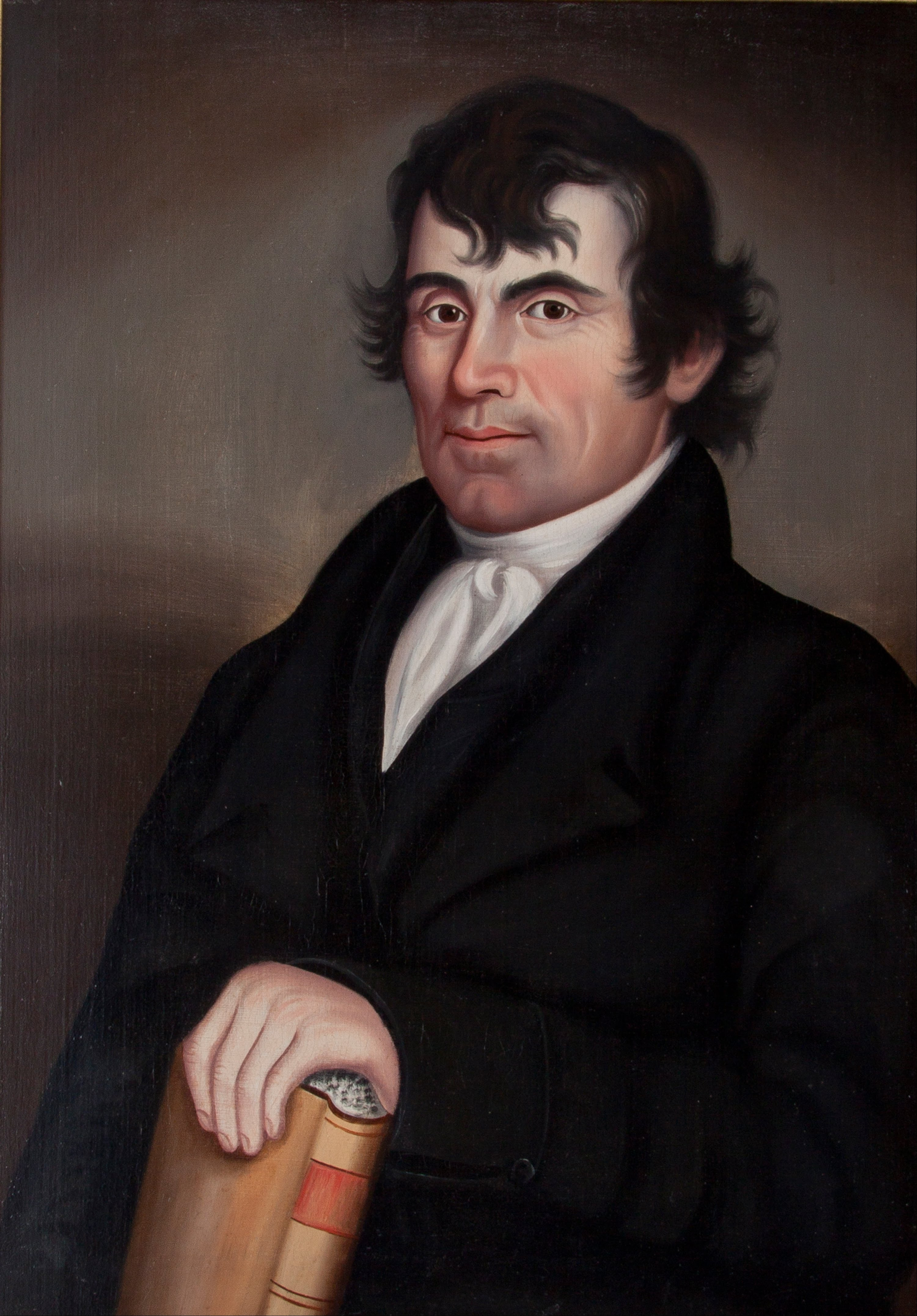

Member of the Kentucky House of Representatives from Shelby County
- In office 1792–1795

Member of the Virginia House of Delegates from Lincoln County
- In office October 17, 1785 – October 14, 1787 Serving with John Edwards, John Jouett
- Preceded by: John Logan
- Succeeded by: Baker Ewing
- In office May 7, 1781 – April 1782 Serving with John Edwards
- Preceded by: position created
- Succeeded by: Isaac Hite

Personal details
- Born: May 1, 1743 Augusta County, Colony of Virginia
- Died: December 11, 1802 (aged 59) Shelbyville, Kentucky

Military service
- Branch/service: Virginia Militia; Kentucky Militia
- Years of service: 1764-1788
- Rank: General
- Battles/wars: Lord Dunmore's War; American Revolutionary War; Northwest Indian War; Logan's Raid

Benjamin Logan (May 1, 1743 – December 11, 1802) was an American pioneer, soldier, and politician from Virginia, then Shelby County, Kentucky. As colonel of the Kentucky County, Virginia militia during the American Revolutionary War, he was second-in-command of all the trans-Appalachian Virginia. He became a politician and helped secure statehood for Kentucky. His brother, John Logan, who at times served under him in the militia and replaced him as delegate, became the first state treasurer of Kentucky.

== Early and family life ==
Benjamin Logan was born in then-vast Augusta County, Virginia, the eldest son of Scottish immigrants David and Jane (McKinley) Logan. He had seven siblings by the time his father died, when Benjamin Logan was 15. By primogeniture, Benjamin inherited the family's 860 acre (3.5 km^{2}) farm, but would sell it when he reached legal age, then split the proceeds with his siblings and move across the Appalachian Mountains to the Holston River, where he purchased land and began to farm. He married Ann Montgomery in 1772; they had eight children.

== Militia Officer ==
Logan served in the Virginia militia during Henry Bouquet's 1764 campaign against the Shawnee. A decade later, he served as a lieutenant in Lord Dunmore's War against the same Indian nation. In 1775, Logan joined a party of settlers led by Daniel Boone who traveled to Kentucky, then the westernmost portion of Virginia. He left the group in what would become Lincoln County. With the help of his brother John and others, he built a stockade known as Logan's Fort which eventually would grow into the town of St. Asaph's near Stanford. In 1776, Logan brought his family from Virginia to join him, but initially settled them at Harrod's Fort, as less exposed to Native raids, but in 1777 they joined him at Logan's Fort. However, beginning on May 20, 1777, the fort was besieged by a hundred native warriors. When the garrison's provisions and ammunition ran low, Logan and two companions left during the night and traveled 150 miles to the Holston settlement. Logan returned as fast as he could with powder and lead; his companions followed with a relief party under Col. John Bowman, which caused the besiegers to scatter.

Logan was appointed sheriff of the county and a justice of the peace. During the American Revolution, he was the second ranking officer in the Virginia militia for Kentucky County, taking part in the defense of the settlements against attacks made by British-led Indians. In July 1779, under Co. Bowman, Logan as second-in-command led 300 men in an expedition across the Ohio River to the native settlement at Chillicothe. He also joined in campaigns against hostile Indians north of the Ohio River, serving under George Rogers Clark. However, Logan and Clark frequently disagreed over strategy.

After American independence, Logan became active in the campaign to establish Kentucky as a separate state. He served as Kentucky's representative in the Virginia House of Delegates from 1781 until 1787 when he began arguing for statehood.

In October 1786, Logan led a force of Kentucky mounted militiamen against the Shawnee towns in the Ohio Country along the Little Miami River and Mad River (Logan's Raid). These were lightly defended since most warriors had left to defend the villages of Chief Little Turtle from a separate force moving up the Wabash River under the command of General George Rogers Clark. Logan seized and burned thirteen villages, taking prisoner women and children, destroying the food supplies and killing or capturing many, including the aged Chief Moluntha who surrendered under a U.S. flag outside his wegiwa while displaying the Shawnee copy of the Treaty of Fort Finney (1785). Despite the protection of Logan's men, Captain Hugh McGary slipped through the guard and murdered the Shawnee chief. The chief's death infuriated the Shawnee, who retaliated by redoubling their attacks against the whites, and escalating the Northwest Indian War.

Logan served as one of Lincoln County's initial representatives to the Virginia House of Delegates in 1781, and also served in the 1785, 1786, and 1787 sessions. Meanwhile, Virginia conducted a tax census, which listed both John and Benjamin as non-residents of Lincoln County, but taxed each for slaves and livestock in the county, John for three enslaved adults and two younger slaves, as well as seven horses, a stud horse, and 30 cattle, and Benjamin for three adult slaves, five younger slaves, eight horses and 70 cattle. Since Benjamin Logan does not appear as a resident of another county, he may have been overlooked or away conducting a military expedition.

Benjamin Logan advocated for Kentucky statehood at the Danville Convention and was a delegate when it wrote the first Kentucky constitution in 1791 and 1792. Following statehood, he served in the Kentucky House of Representatives from 1792 to 1795. He ran unsuccessfully for governor in 1795 and 1800, and for the U.S. Senate in 1798. In his 1795 campaign for governor, Logan won the first round of balloting but lost on the second to James Garrard.

== Death and legacy ==
In 1802, Benjamin Logan died of a stroke at age 60, at his home 6 miles southwest of Shelbyville, Kentucky. He was buried in the family cemetery.

Both Logan County, Kentucky and Logan County, Ohio were named for him, as is the Benjamin Logan Local School District in Ohio.

He was the uncle of U.S. Supreme Court associate justice John McKinley.
