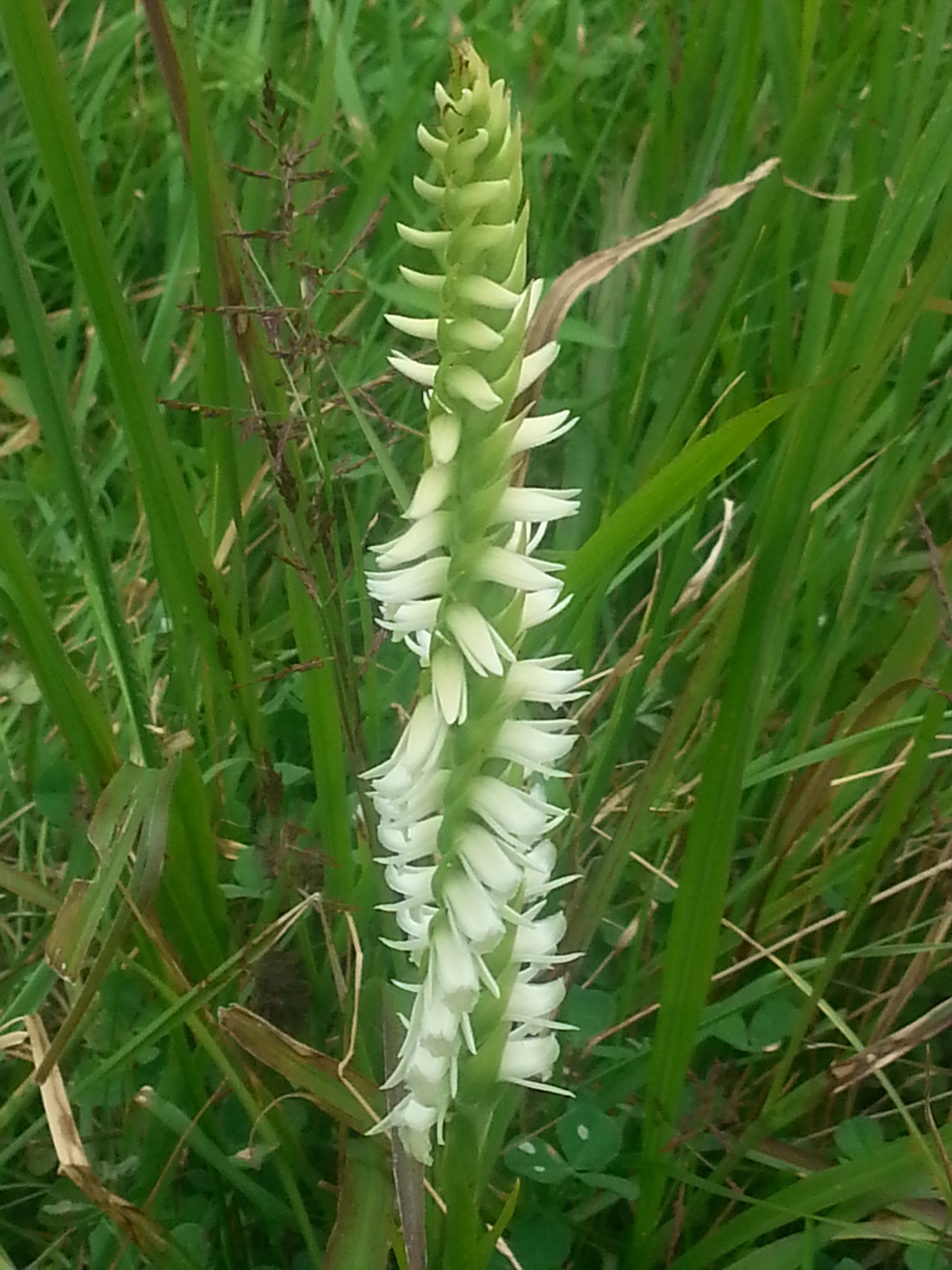

Conservation status
- Secure (NatureServe)

Scientific classification
- Kingdom: Plantae
- Clade: Tracheophytes
- Clade: Angiosperms
- Clade: Monocots
- Order: Asparagales
- Family: Orchidaceae
- Subfamily: Orchidoideae
- Tribe: Cranichideae
- Genus: Spiranthes
- Species: S. odorata

Binomial name
- Spiranthes odorata Nutt.

= Spiranthes odorata =

Species of orchid

Spiranthes odorata, marsh lady's tresses or common lady's tresses, is a species of flowering plant in the orchid family, native to the southeastern United States, from Texas eastwards and northwards to Delaware. It grows in moist, partially shaded environments with acidic or neutral soil.

An herbaceous perennial, this orchid grows up to 50 cm (20 in) tall and broad. The flowers are borne in dense vertical rows on sturdy green spikes, in a slightly twisted pattern (hence Spiranthes, "twisted flower"). This effect is due to uneven cell growth. The flowers, which appear in late summer and autumn, are white, hooded and fragrant (hence the specific epithet odorata).

This plant is pollinated by bumblebees, notably Bombus pensylvanicus, Bombus fervidus, Bombus impatiens, and Bombus nevadensis.

In the UK, the cultivar 'Chadd's Ford' has gained the Royal Horticultural Society's Award of Garden Merit. Requiring a fertile soil in partial shade, it is hardy down to −10 °C (14 °F), but in frosty areas needs a dry mulch during the winter months. Botanically it is not actually a Spiranthes odorata but a different species called Spiranthes bightensis.
