= Spiranthes × kapnosperia =

Smoky ladies' tresses

Scientific classification
- Kingdom: Plantae
- Clade: Tracheophytes
- Clade: Angiosperms
- Clade: Monocots
- Order: Asparagales
- Family: Orchidaceae
- Subfamily: Orchidoideae
- Tribe: Cranichideae
- Genus: Spiranthes
- Species: S. × kapnosperia

Binomial name
- Spiranthes × kapnosperia M.C. Pace

Species of orchid

Spiranthes × kapnosperia, the smoky ladies' tresses, is a species of orchid growing in the Eastern United States. This species is documented in New York (state), Ohio, Illinois, Tennessee, North Carolina, and South Carolina.

== Taxonomy ==
Spiranthes × kapnosperia was first described in 2017 as the name for hybrids of Spiranthes cernua and S. ochroleuca. Charles Sheviak and other researchers had long suggested these species hybridized, but no name was proposed. The name Spiranthes sheviakii was proposed in 2021 as an additional name for hybrids of S. cernua and S. ochroleuca, however hybrid combinations may have only one name, per The Code. Thus, S. sheviakii is a synonym of S. × kapnosperia. Based on molecular patterns, it is hypothesized that this hybrid formed at least twice, likely in different regions.
