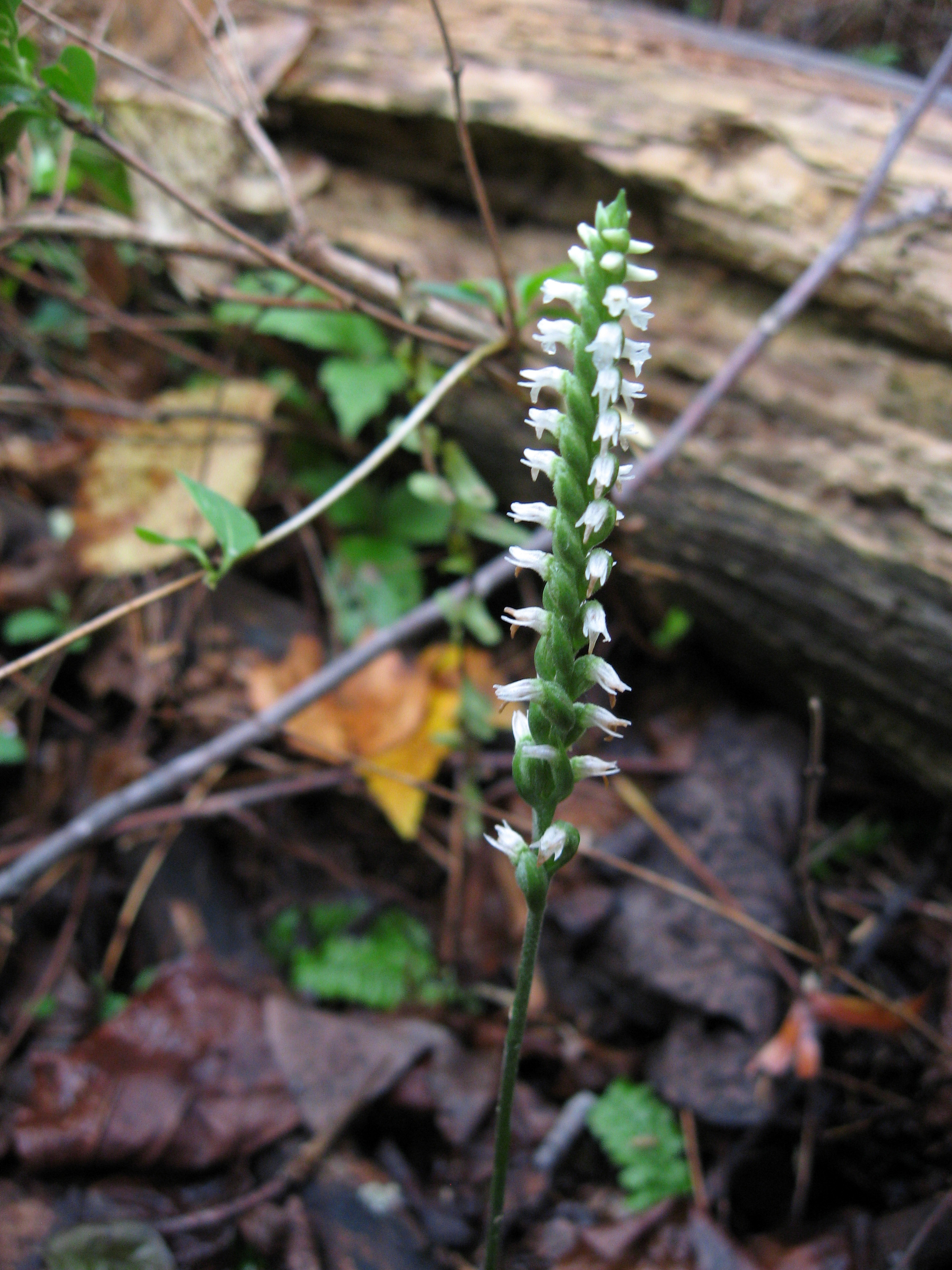

Scientific classification
- Kingdom: Plantae
- Clade: Tracheophytes
- Clade: Angiosperms
- Clade: Monocots
- Order: Asparagales
- Family: Orchidaceae
- Subfamily: Orchidoideae
- Tribe: Cranichideae
- Genus: Spiranthes
- Species: S. ovalis

Binomial name
- Spiranthes ovalis Lindl.

= Spiranthes ovalis =

Species of orchid

Spiranthes ovalis, commonly called the October lady's tresses, is a species of orchid that is native to eastern North America.

Its range is widely distributed, being found from Texas to Florida, north to the Great Lakes. However, it is uncommon throughout most of its range, which has resulted in a patchy known distribution. Its natural habitat is in wet to mesic forests and woodlands.

It produces delicate white flowers in the fall. It can be distinguished from other Spiranthes in eastern North America by its small, tightly spiraled flowers, and the presence of basal leaves at flowering time.

== Taxonomy ==
Two varieties of Spiranthes ovalis are recognized. They are:

- S. ovalis var. erostellata - Flowers closed, self-pollinating; widespread across the eastern North America
- S. ovalis var. ovalis - Flowers open, cross-pollinating; restricted to the Southeastern Coastal Plain
