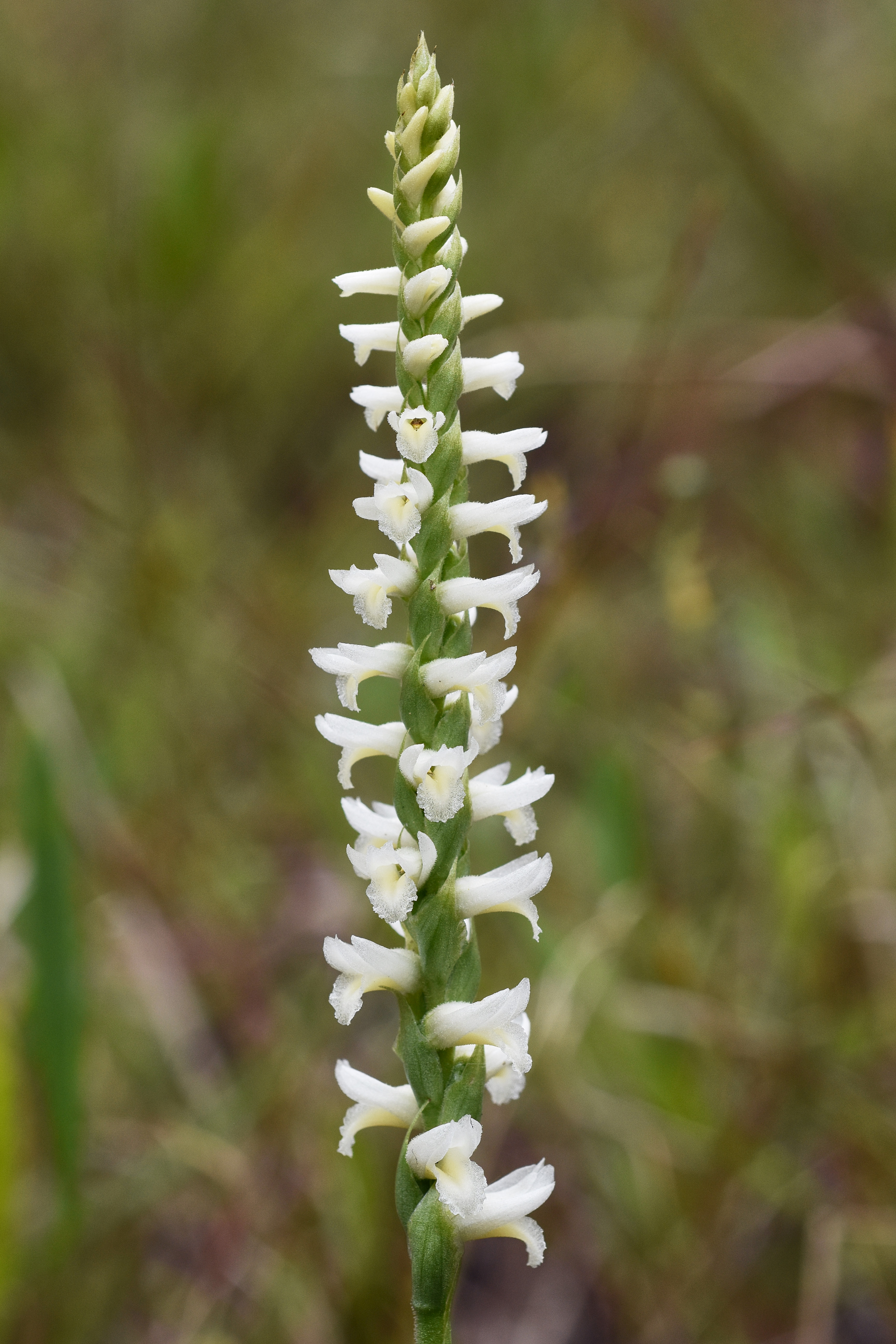

Scientific classification
- Kingdom: Plantae
- Clade: Tracheophytes
- Clade: Angiosperms
- Clade: Monocots
- Order: Asparagales
- Family: Orchidaceae
- Subfamily: Orchidoideae
- Tribe: Cranichideae
- Genus: Spiranthes
- Species: S. magnicamporum

Binomial name
- Spiranthes magnicamporum Sheviak

= Spiranthes magnicamporum =

Species of plant

Spiranthes magnicamporum, commonly called the Great Plains lady's tresses, is a species of orchid that is native to North America. It is primarily native in the Great Plains, but there are outlying populations in the east in areas of former natural grassland, such as the Black Belt prairies of the Southeast. It is found in both fens and wet and dry prairies, often in calcareous soil.

== Description ==
It is a perennial that produces a spiral of white flowers in the fall. It is closely related to the Spiranthes cernua complex, and it was not recognized as a separate species until the 1970s. S. magnicamporum can be distinguished by its much stronger scent, later flowering time, and lateral sepals that spread over the top of the flower. The scent of the S. magnicamporum is comparable to the smell of coumarin.

== Distribution ==
The Lady's Tresses occurs mostly in the United States of America and part of Canada.

== Ecology ==
Interactions between Lady's Tresses and Its pollinating partners have only been explored in the Southern Plain Population. The most common pollinators are the southern plain bumble bees, the sweat bees, eastern carpenter bees, two-spotted bumble bees. Studies on Mycorrhizal associations for Lady's Tresses have not been conducted.
