= Spiranthes nebulorum =

Scientific classification
- Kingdom: Plantae
- Clade: Tracheophytes
- Clade: Angiosperms
- Clade: Monocots
- Order: Asparagales
- Family: Orchidaceae
- Subfamily: Orchidoideae
- Tribe: Cranichideae
- Genus: Spiranthes
- Species: S. nebulorum

Binomial name
- Spiranthes nebulorum Catling & V. R. Catling

Species of orchid

Spiranthes nebulorum is a species of orchid found in Mexico and Guatemala.

== Description ==
Spiranthes nebulorum reach a height of 18-33cm. They have 2–5 leaves which are up to 9cm long. The leaf shape is linear-lanceolate to narrowly oblong-lanceolate. The 10-30 flowers are arranged in a dense spiral around the stem. Like all Spiranthes, each flower head has 3 sepals (with the dorsal sepal at the top) and 3 petals (with the labellum at the bottom). The sepals and petals are white to greenish white and the sepals have visible green veins.

They look similar to Spiranthes graminea, Spiranthes laciniata and Spiranthes praecox but their ranges do not overlap.

== Distribution and habitat ==
Spiranthes nebulorum occurs in the southern Sierra Madre Oriental, in Oaxaca, and in Chiapas in Mexico, and in Alta Verapaz, Chimaltenango, and Huehuetenango in Guatemala.

They prefer grassy and rocky slopes as well as sphagnum bogs. They occur at elevations from 2000-3150m.

== Taxonomy ==
Spiranthes nebulorum specimens were first collected by Lindley and labelled as Spiranthes graminea. Paul M. Catling and Vivian R. Catling described the plants as a new species in 1988.
