= Spiranthes igniorchis =

Fire ladies' tresses

Scientific classification
- Kingdom: Plantae
- Clade: Tracheophytes
- Clade: Angiosperms
- Clade: Monocots
- Order: Asparagales
- Family: Orchidaceae
- Subfamily: Orchidoideae
- Tribe: Cranichideae
- Genus: Spiranthes
- Species: S. igniorchis

Binomial name
- Spiranthes igniorchis M. C. Pace

Species of orchid

Spiranthes igniorchis, or fire ladies' tresses, is a species of orchid endemic to Florida.

== Description ==
Spiranthes igniorchis, like all Spiranthes, have small tubular flowers arranged in a spiral around the stem, with each flower made from 3 petals and 3 sepals. All sepals and petals are white, but the inside part of the lip (bottom-most petal) is pale yellow to greenish-yellow. They are closely related to and look similar to Spiranthes longilabris but they have smaller flowers and bloom from August to September (vs December for longilabris). They also look similar to Spiranthes laciniata (which blooms from May to July in Florida).

== Distribution and habitat ==
Spiranthes igniorchis is endemic to southern-central Florida and only grows in burnt seasonally wet grassland. The common name refers to the reliance on fire swept habitat - which is very rare now due to fire suppression.

== Taxonomy ==
Spiranthes igniorchis was first described by M. C. Pace et al. in 2017. Based on molecular analysis of collected specimens they determined those plants to be a sister species to Spiranthes longilabris within the Spiranthes cernua species complex. Extensive herbarium searches among similarly looking Spiranthes specimens (but labelled as different species) found no other plants and none are known to have been collected prior to specimens collected by S. L. Orzell and E. Bridges in 2014 in Polk County, Florida. This indicates the species is endemic to a small area in the Osceola Plain of southern-central Florida.
