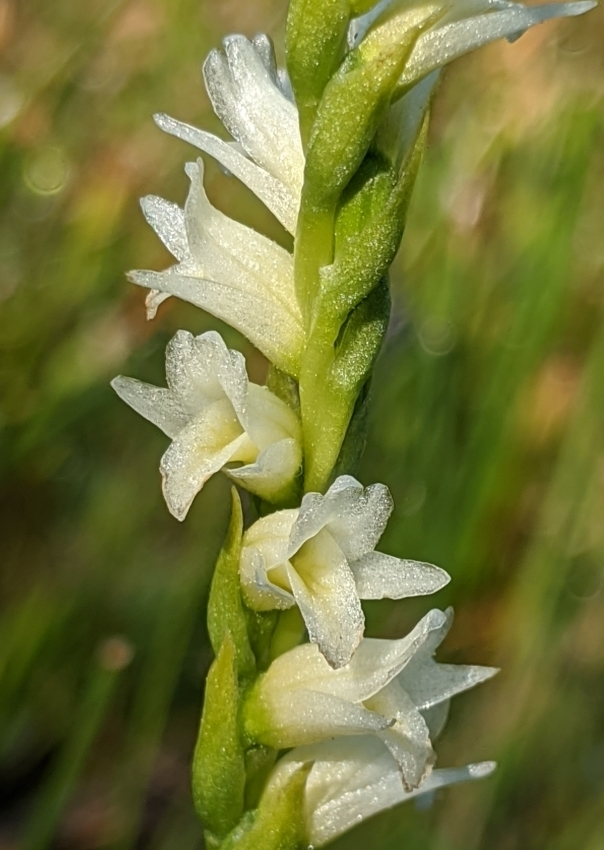
- Inflorescence

Scientific classification
- Kingdom: Plantae
- Clade: Tracheophytes
- Clade: Angiosperms
- Clade: Monocots
- Order: Asparagales
- Family: Orchidaceae
- Subfamily: Orchidoideae
- Tribe: Cranichideae
- Genus: Spiranthes
- Species: S. perexilis

Binomial name
- Spiranthes perexilis (Sheviak) M.C.Pace

= Spiranthes perexilis =

languid ladies’-tresses

Species of orchid

Spiranthes perexilis, the languid ladies’-tresses, is a species of orchid native to California and Oregon.

== Description ==
Spiranthes perexilis plants are closely related to Spiranthes romanzoffiana and similar in appearance, but "gracile and open-spiralled, with narrow subpandurate labella". Spiranthes porrifolia plants also look similar.

== Distribution and habitat ==
Spiranthes perexilis has been found in California and Oregon.

It grows in fens and wet meadows, often along the edge of the fen area and the slightly higher area around it. Within the Sierra Nevada and the Cascade Range it grows in similar habitat to Spiranthes porrifolia and Spiranthes romanzoffiana.

== Taxonomy ==
Spiranthes perexilis plants were first described by Paul Martin Brown in 2008 as Spiranthes stellata but apparently contained a mix of species in the holotype sheet used to describe the new species. C. J. Sheviak first described the plants now accepted as Spiranthes perexilis as a subspecies called Spiranthes stellata subsp. perexilis in 2012 and M. C. Pace elevated them to species status in 2019.
