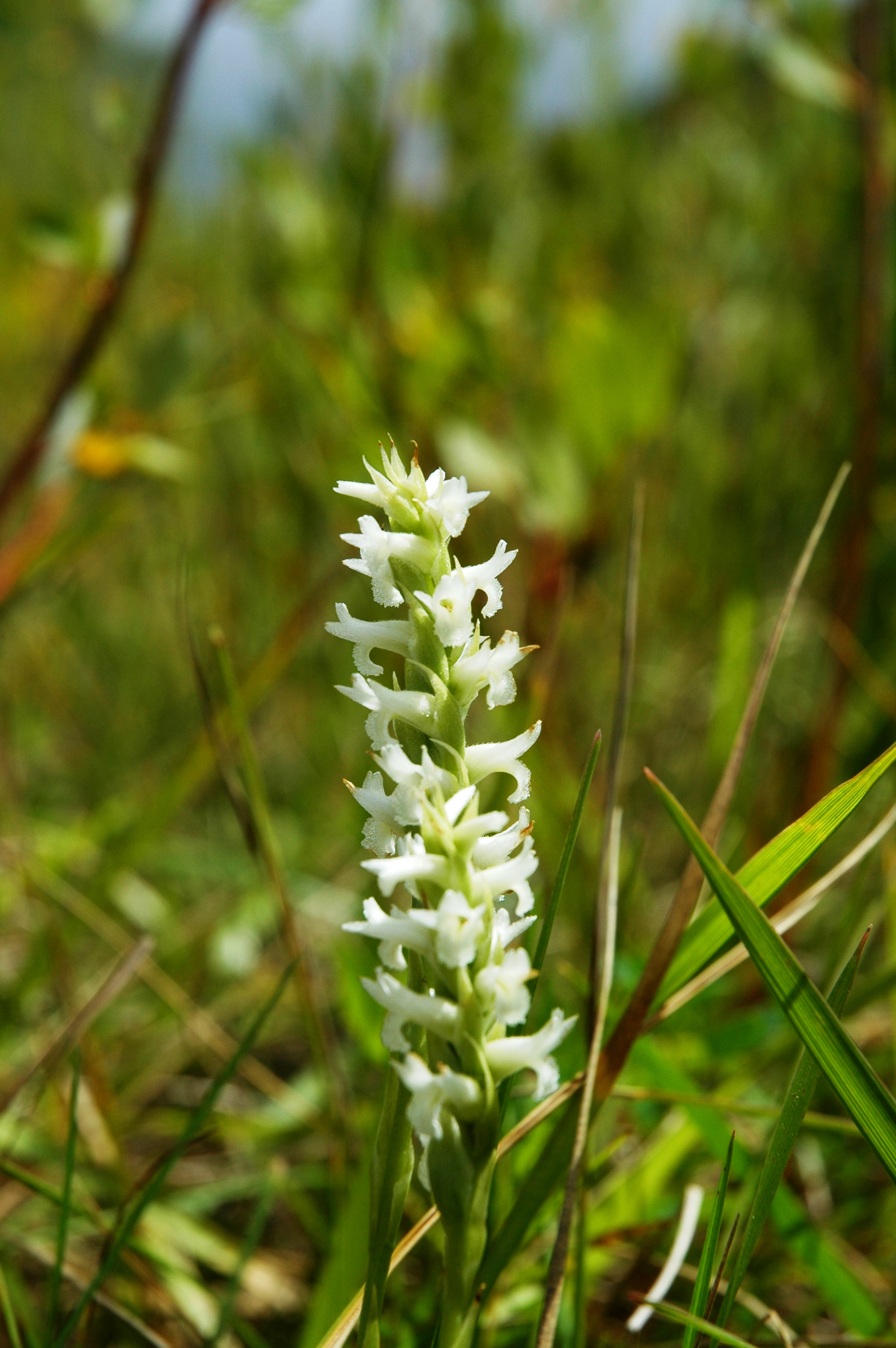

Conservation status
- Imperiled (NatureServe)

- Threatened (ESA)

Scientific classification
- Kingdom: Plantae
- Clade: Tracheophytes
- Clade: Angiosperms
- Clade: Monocots
- Order: Asparagales
- Family: Orchidaceae
- Subfamily: Orchidoideae
- Tribe: Cranichideae
- Genus: Spiranthes
- Species: S. diluvialis

Binomial name
- Spiranthes diluvialis Sheviak

Synonyms
- Spiranthes romanzoffiana var. diluvialis (Sheviak) S.L. Welsh

= Spiranthes diluvialis =

Species of orchid

Spiranthes diluvialis is a rare species of orchid known as Ute lady's tresses (also, Ute ladies'-tresses). The species name diluvialis means "of the flood". It is native to the western United States, where there are scattered, mostly small occurrences in the states of Colorado, Idaho, Montana, Nebraska, Nevada, Utah, Washington, and Wyoming. Two occurrences were discovered in southern British Columbia in 2006. The plant faces a number of threats to its existence. It is a federally listed threatened species of the United States but was proposed for delisting in 2025.

== Taxonomy ==
Specimens of this orchid were first collected in 1856 and have been labeled with the names of several species, including Spiranthes romanzoffiana, S. cernua, and S. porrifolia before the plant was finally described as a new species in 1984. Morphological and genetic analysis suggest that the orchid is of ancient hybrid origin between S. romanzoffiana and S. magnicamporum and is tetraploid, with four sets of chromosomes resulting from the combination of a pair from each parent species.

It was scientifically described by Charles John Sheviak and placed in the genus Spiranthes as part of the family Orchidaceae. It was described as a variety of Spiranthes romanzoffiana in 1993 by Stanley Larson Welsh, but this has not been accepted.

== Description ==
It is a perennial terrestrial orchid with an erect stem growing 20 to 62 centimeters in height. The narrow lance-shaped leaves are arranged around the base of the stem and are up to 28 centimeters in length. The inflorescence is a spiral of many flowers on a stalk coated in glandular hairs. The flower has narrow white or ivory-colored petals. Blooming occurs in July and August, and sometimes into September, and October. The plant reproduces sexually by seed and vegetatively by sprouting from broken-off pieces of root. The seeds are so small they are like dust; one plant can produce 100,000 individual seeds. Like other orchids, this species depends on mycorrhizal fungi to help the seeds germinate. The flowers are pollinated by bees of genus Anthophora, especially Anthophora terminalis, as well as bumblebees (Bombus spp.).

== Habitat ==
This plant grows in moist wetland habitat, including bogs and riparian areas such as riverbanks, floodplains, lakeshores, riverside woodlands and forest, desert springs, and meadows, and human-made habitat such as ditches, reservoirs, and irrigated agricultural settings. In 2005 there were about 52 occurrences. The population size is difficult to count or estimate because the plant spends most of its time in a vegetative or dormant state, in which there are few or no aboveground plant parts and these may be hidden in dense surrounding vegetation or hard to identify. Some plants may be dormant underground for years at a time. What appear on paper to be larger populations are actually areas that have been more often and intensely surveyed.

== Conservation ==
Spiranthes diluvialis is a federally listed threatened species of the United States. However, it was proposed for delisting in 2025 due to successful recovery efforts. It is listed as a critically endangered and fully protected species by the State of Nevada. The plant has been assessed by the Committee on the Status of Endangered Wildlife in Canada (COSEWIC) as nationally endangered. The International Union for Conservation of Nature lists S. diluvialis as globally of least concern based on the estimates on the number of mature individuals made in 2004 and 2005.

Threats to this species include habitat loss and degradation via many processes. Urban development has led to the extirpation of a number of populations, including some within the Salt Lake City and Colorado Springs metropolitan areas. It continues to be a threat in many areas, including the vicinity of Boulder, Colorado. Threats associated with urban development include the introduction of weeds into the habitat and the loss of pollinating insects. Construction and maintenance of roads and other infrastructure, such as dams and pipelines, damages habitat. Recreational activities in the plant's riparian habitat, such as boating and off-road vehicle use, can be damaging. Some populations grow in irrigated fields and are susceptible to mowing and other farm activity, and the conversion to agricultural use consumes natural areas. As much as 65% of the plant's known habitat is affected by cattle and horse grazing; this can be harmful but it may also be beneficial in some ways, especially if the animals eat competing weeds. The orchid grows in wetland habitat, which is degraded by any process that alters the local hydrology; one estimate had 52% of all individuals in areas threatened by hydrological change. Water is diverted for irrigation and municipal use. The orchid grows in flood-prone river habitat and flood suppression via levees and other structures affects and prevents this natural process. River restoration activities have been known to negatively affect orchid populations that have become established or re-established in previously altered river habitat.

Invasive species of plants considered threats include redtop (Agrostis stolonifera), musk thistle (Carduus nutans), spotted knapweed (Centaurea maculosa), Russian knapweed (Acroptilon repens), creeping thistle (Cirsium arvense), Fullers teasel (Dipsacus fullonum), oleaster (Elaeagnus angustifolia), quickgrass (Elytrigia repens), leafy spurge (Euphorbia esula), peppergrass (Lepidium latifolium), purple loosestrife (Lythrum salicaria), reed canary grass (Phalaris arundinacea), sow thistle (Sonchus arvensis), and saltcedar (Tamarix chinensis).

This plant grows in many types of habitat reliant on natural cycles of disturbance, such as flooding and occasional wildfire. Without these processes, the habitat becomes overgrown and large and woody vegetation types move in as ecological succession causes overall change. When flooding is controlled and fire suppression is implemented, the orchid may face inadequate conditions, such as too much shade or thick layers of built-up leaf litter.

Other threats include herbivory by native animals such as bighorn sheep, voles, and rabbits. The loss of pollinating bees is a threat, as is the loss of other wildflowers that attract the bees. Other documented threats include drought, pesticides, pollution, and poaching.
