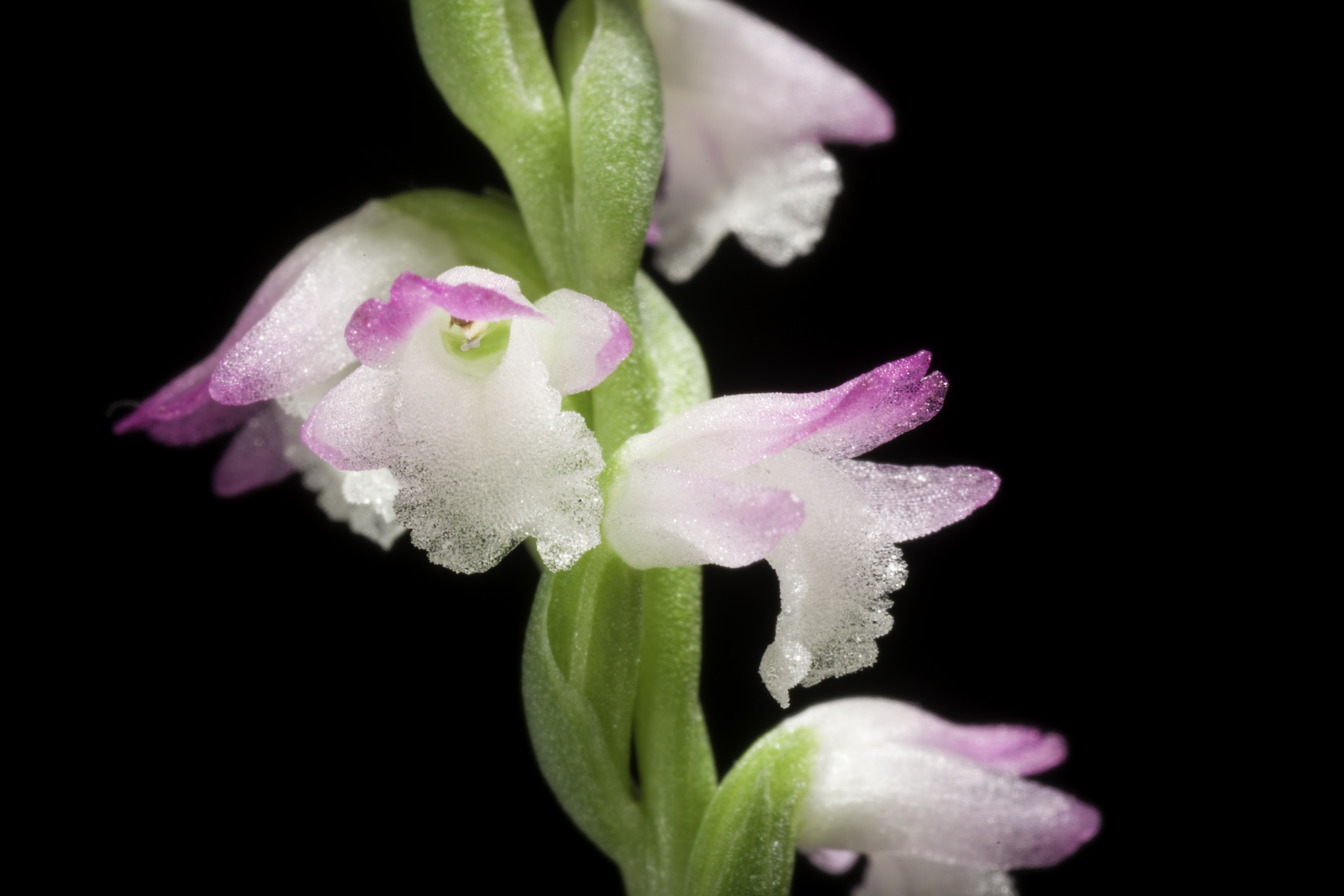

Scientific classification
- Kingdom: Plantae
- Clade: Tracheophytes
- Clade: Angiosperms
- Clade: Monocots
- Order: Asparagales
- Family: Orchidaceae
- Subfamily: Orchidoideae
- Tribe: Cranichideae
- Genus: Spiranthes
- Species: S. sinensis

Binomial name
- Spiranthes sinensis (Pers.) Ames

Synonyms
- Neottia sinensis Pers. (basionym); Aristotelea spiralis Lour.; Calanthe australis Aiton ex Loudon; Epidendrum aristotelea Raeusch.; Gyrostachys amoena Blume; Gyrostachys australis (R.Br.) Blume; Gyrostachys australis var. flexuosa (Sm.) Blume; Gyrostachys congesta (Lindl.) Kuntze; Gyrostachys novifuburgensis Kuntze; Gyrostachys stylites (Lindl.) Kuntze; Gyrostachys wightiana Kuntze; Ibidium spirale (Lour.) Makino; Ibidium viridiflorum (Makino) Makino; Monustes australis (R.Br.) Raf.; Neottia amoena M.Bieb.; Neottia australis R.Br.; Neottia crispata Blume; Neottia flexuosa Sm.; Neottia parviflora Sm.; Neottia pudica (Lindl.) Sweet; Ophrys spiralis Georgi; Spiranthes amoena (M.Bieb.) Spreng.; Spiranthes aristotelea (Raeusch.) Merr.; Spiranthes australis (R.Br.) Lindl.; Spiranthes australis var. pudica (Lindl.) F.Muell.; Spiranthes australis var. suishaensis Hayata; Spiranthes australis var. viridiflora Makino; Spiranthes congesta Lindl.; Spiranthes crispata Zoll. & Moritzi; Spiranthes densa A.Rich.; Spiranthes flexuosa (Sm.) Lindl.; Spiranthes indica Lindl. ex Steud.; Spiranthes longispicata A.Rich.; Spiranthes neocaledonica Schltr.; Spiranthes novae-zelandiae Hook.f.; Spiranthes papuana Schltr.; Spiranthes parviflora; Spiranthes pudica Lindl.; Spiranthes sinensis f. autumnus Tsukaya; Spiranthes sinensis f. gracilis F.Maek. ex Tsukaya; Spiranthes sinensis var. amoena (M.Bieb.) H.Hara; Spiranthes sinensis var. australis (R.Br.) H.Hara & S.Kitam.; Spiranthes spiralis (Lour.) Makino; Spiranthes stylites Lindl.; Spiranthes suishanensis (Hayata) Schltr.; Spiranthes viridiflora (Makino) Makino; Spiranthes wightiana Lindl. ex Wall.

= Spiranthes sinensis =

Chinese ladies' tresses

Species of orchid

Spiranthes sinensis, commonly known as the Chinese spiranthes, is a species of orchid occurring in eastern and southeastern Asia.

Spiranthes sinensis was long thought to be a species complex, and more than 30 names have been synonymized under it; recent molecular and morphological data found that the complex was composed of six distinct species. 'True' S. sinensis sensu stricto is glabrous, blooms in the spring, and has pale blush-pink flowers. This species had formerly been thought to occur throughout Asia and Australia, it is actually restricted to southeast Asia, eastern East Asia, and southern Japan. The other species to be recognized out of this species complex are Spiranthes australis, Spiranthes flexuosa, Spiranthes maokensis, Spiranthes sunii, and Spiranthes suishanensis.

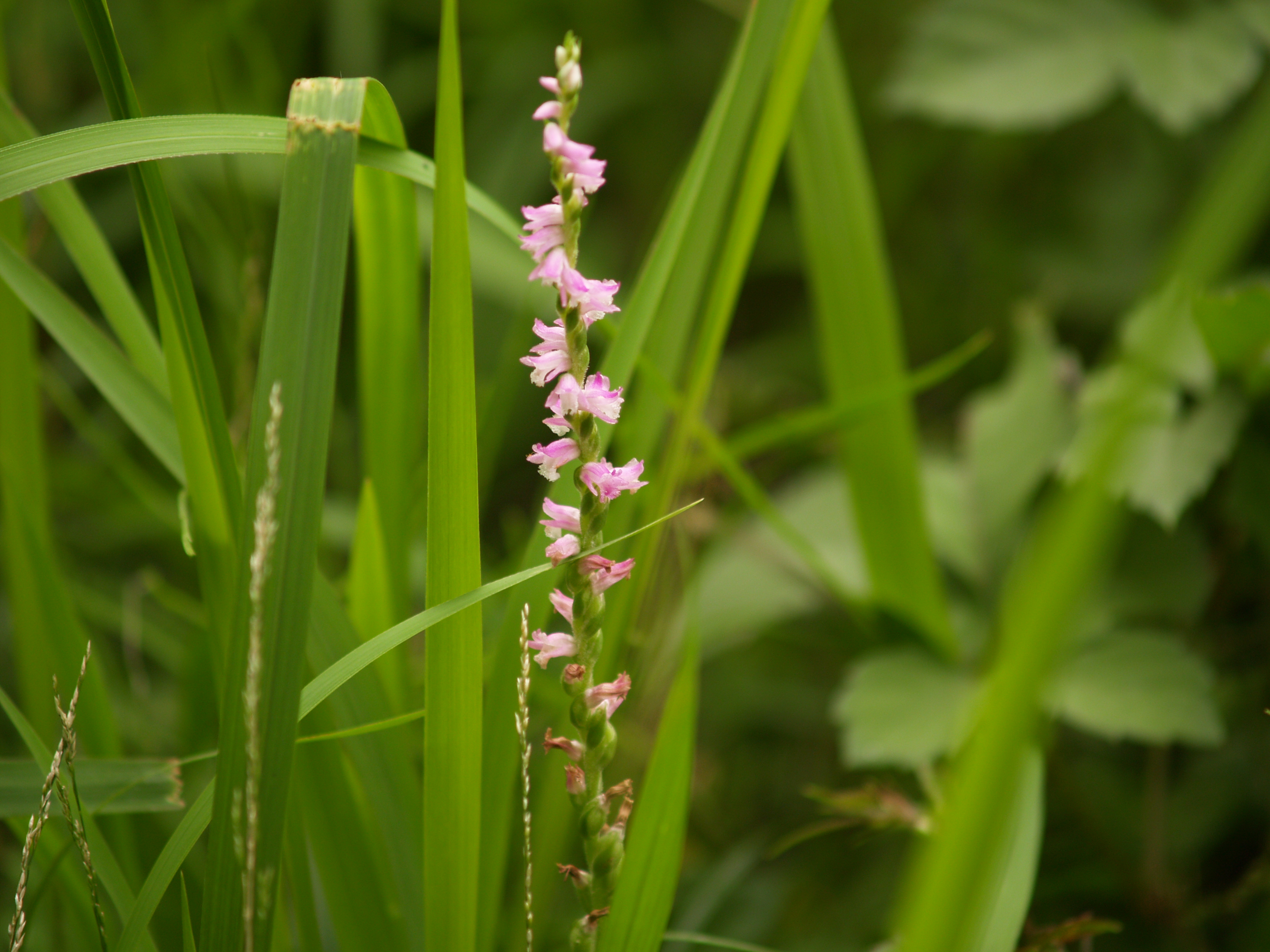
Spiranthes sinensis
