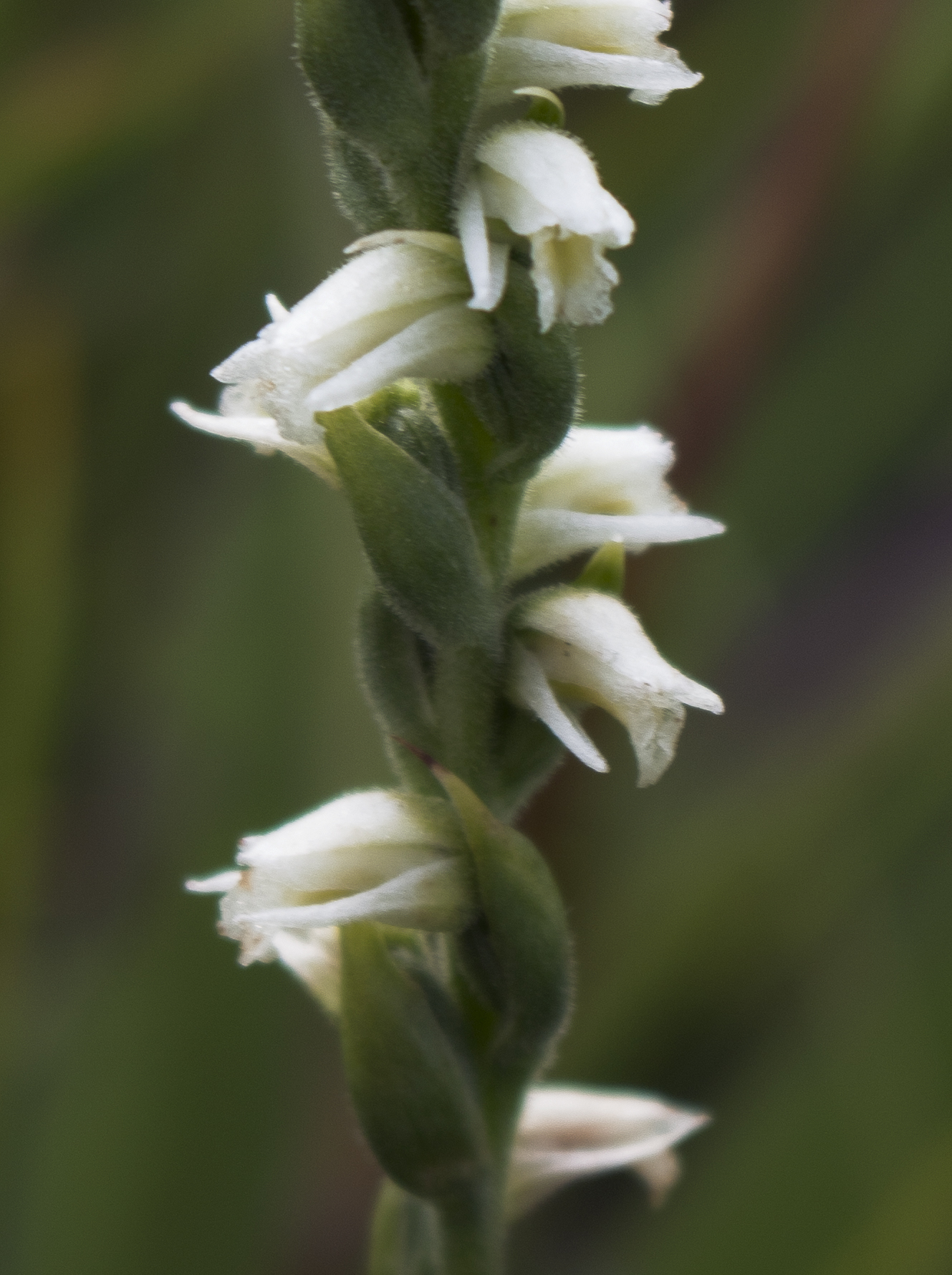

Conservation status
- Least Concern (IUCN 3.1)

Scientific classification
- Kingdom: Plantae
- Clade: Tracheophytes
- Clade: Angiosperms
- Clade: Monocots
- Order: Asparagales
- Family: Orchidaceae
- Subfamily: Orchidoideae
- Tribe: Cranichideae
- Genus: Spiranthes
- Species: S. casei

Binomial name
- Spiranthes casei Catling & Cruise

= Spiranthes casei =

Case's lady's tresses

Species of orchid

Spiranthes casei, or Case's lady's tresses, is a species of orchid native to the northeastern United States and Canada.

== Description ==
Spiranthes casei plants are 7–44 cm tall. They have both basal and stem leaves and the basal leaves can still be present when flowering in August and September. As with all Spiranthes flowers are arranged in a spiral around the stem, and each flower has 3 petals and 3 sepals which together give it a tube-like shape. The petals and sepals have an ivory to yellowish white or greenish cream color.

Spiranthes casei is very closely related to and looks similar to Spiranthes ochroleuca but has smaller flowers, the dorsal (top) sepal and tips of the side petals are not recurved, and they have a comparatively reduced labellum.

== Distribution and habitat ==
Spiranthes casei has been found in Maine, Michigan, Minnesota, New Hampshire, New York, Pennsylvania, Vermont and Wisconsin in the US and in Nova Scotia, Ontario and Quebec in Canada. It grows in forest, shrubland and grassland, mostly restricted to the lichen and bracken barrens of the Great Lakes Basin and the Canadian maritime provinces.

== Taxonomy ==
Spiranthes casei was first described by P. M. Catling & J. E. Cruise in 1975. They named the new species after orchid researcher Frederick W. Case II. Before Catling & Cruise described it as a new species specimens of Spiranthes casei were often labeled as a hybrid between Spiranthes cernua and Spiranthes lacera or as a northern version of Spiranthes vernalis. The oldest herbarium specimen they could find was collected in Ontario in 1904.
