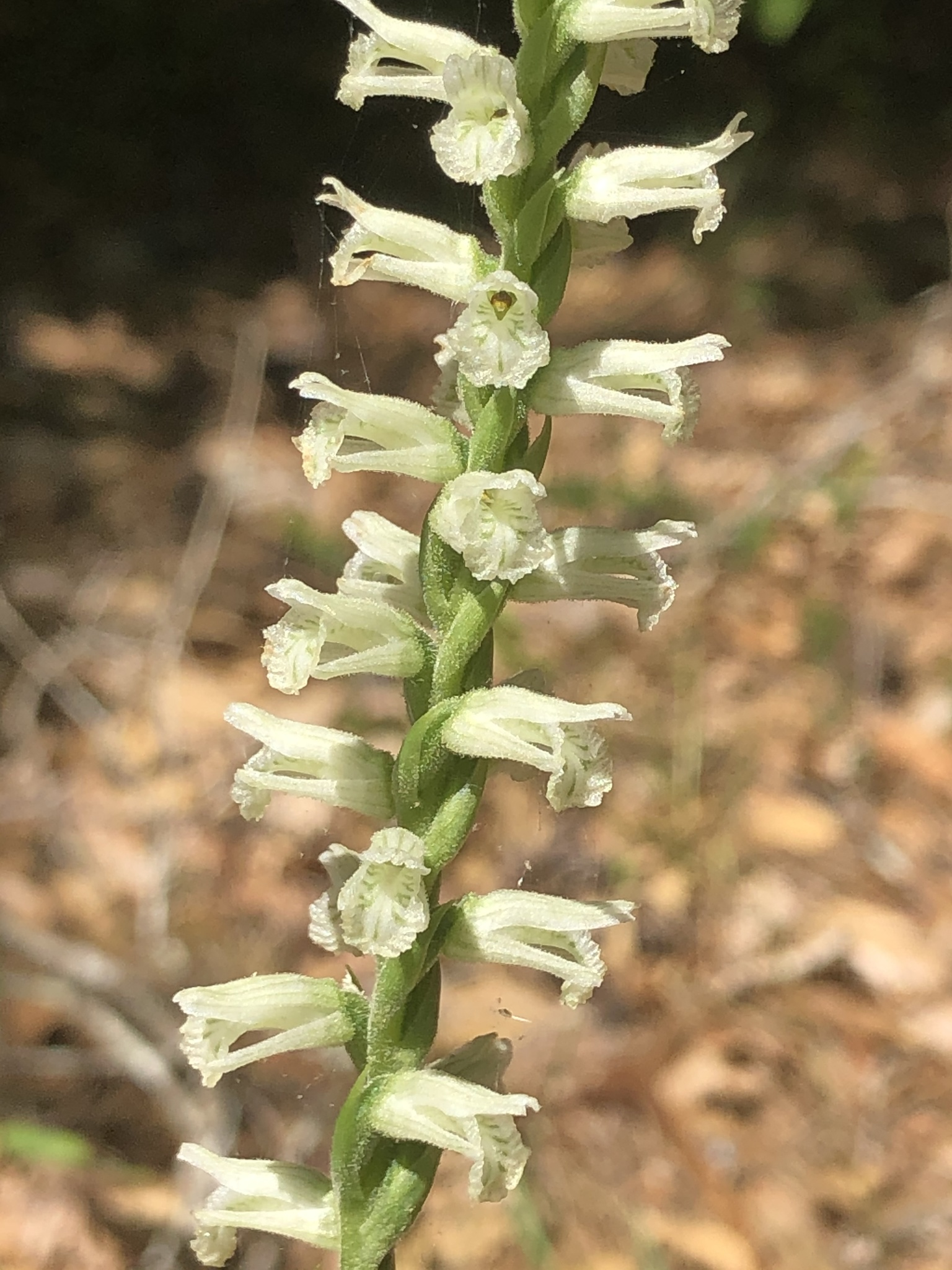

Scientific classification
- Kingdom: Plantae
- Clade: Tracheophytes
- Clade: Angiosperms
- Clade: Monocots
- Order: Asparagales
- Family: Orchidaceae
- Subfamily: Orchidoideae
- Tribe: Cranichideae
- Genus: Spiranthes
- Species: S. sylvatica

Binomial name
- Spiranthes sylvatica P.M.Brown

= Spiranthes sylvatica =

Woodland ladies' tresses

Species of orchid

Spiranthes sylvatica, the woodland ladies' tresses or pale-green ladies'-tresses is a terrestrial orchid endemic to the United States, very similar in appearance and range to Spiranthes praecox which it had been considered a variation of for a long time.

== Description ==
Spiranthes sylvatica plants are a species of tall spiranthes, up to 80 cm high with up to 7 basal leaves. There are 10-30 greenish white flowers arranged in a spiral around the stem. Just like in Spiranthes praecox the lip of each flower has prominent dark green veins. Besides the more greenish flower color another difference of Spiranthes sylvatica to Spiranthes praecox is a larger flower size, 10-17 mm as opposed to 6-9 mm. Bloom time is March to June.

== Distribution and habitat ==
Spiranthes sylvatica is native to Alabama, Florida, Georgia, Louisiana, Mississippi, North Carolina, South Carolina, Texas and Virginia.

It grows in dry forests near the coast such as in live oak hammocks.

== Taxonomy ==
Spiranthes sylvatica was first described as a separate species by Paul Martin Brown in 2001. Before that it had been considered a variation of Spiranthes praecox.
