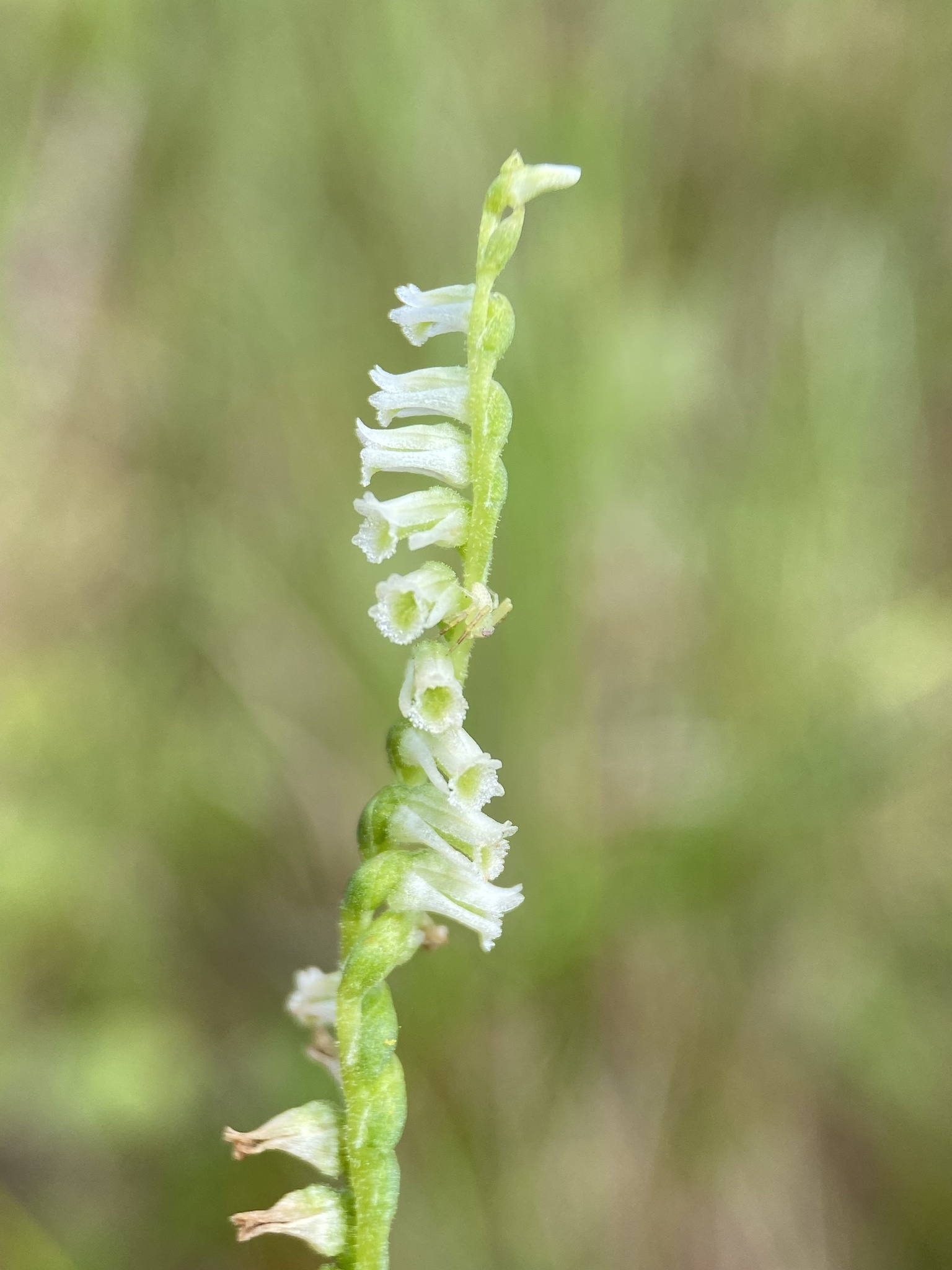

Scientific classification
- Kingdom: Plantae
- Clade: Tracheophytes
- Clade: Angiosperms
- Clade: Monocots
- Order: Asparagales
- Family: Orchidaceae
- Subfamily: Orchidoideae
- Tribe: Cranichideae
- Genus: Spiranthes
- Species: S. eatonii

Binomial name
- Spiranthes eatonii Ames ex P.M.Brown

= Spiranthes eatonii =

Eaton's ladies' tresses

Species of orchid

Spiranthes eatonii, commonly known as Eaton's ladies' tresses is a terrestrial orchid endemic to the United States, closely related to or a variation of Spiranthes lacera.

== Description ==
Spiranthes eatonii plants look almost the same as Spiranthes lacera but grow in a different area and bloom at a different time, in February and March.

== Distribution and habitat ==
Spiranthes eatonii are native to Alabama, Florida, Georgia, Louisiana, Mississippi, North Carolina, South Carolina, Texas and Virginia.

They grow in coastal plains and along the Gulf Coast in dry to wet fields and in woodlands. They can also grow along roads and in cemeteries.

== Taxonomy ==
Spiranthes eatonii was first published by Paul Martin Brown in 1999, after Oakes Ames had named plants collected by A. A. Eaton in 1905 as Spiranthes eatonii but never published the name himself. Daniel Bertram Ward examined the plants in 2012 and considered them a variation of Spiranthes lacera, Spiranthes lacera var. eatonii. More recent research is leaning towards supporting that finding with some publications considering it a separate species and some an early blooming southern variation.
