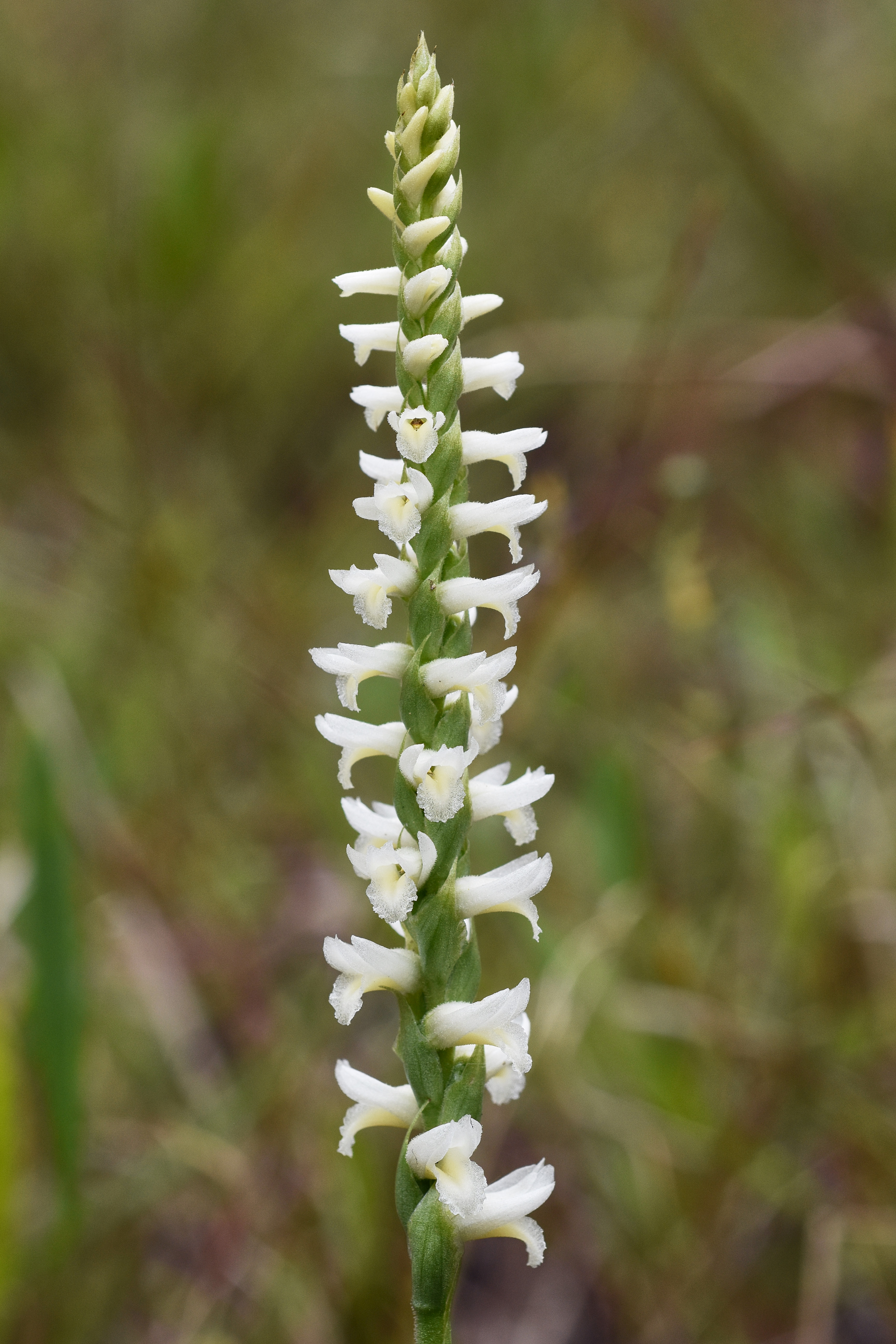
- Spiranthes magnicamporum

Scientific classification
- Kingdom: Plantae
- Clade: Embryophytes
- Clade: Tracheophytes
- Clade: Angiosperms
- Clade: Monocots
- Order: Asparagales
- Family: Orchidaceae
- Subfamily: Orchidoideae
- Tribe: Cranichideae
- Subtribe: Spiranthinae
- Genus: Spiranthes; Rich., 1817

Type species
- Ophrys spiralis = Spiranthes spiralis (L.) Chevall. 1827

Species
- See text

Synonyms
- Orchiastrum Ség.; Triorchis Millán (not validly publ.); Helictonia Ehrh.; Aristotelea Lour.; Gyrostachis Pers. nom. provis.; Tussacia Desv. orth. var.; Gyrostachys Pers. ex Dumort.; Monustes Raf.; Orchiastrum Micheli ex Greene

= Spiranthes =

Genus of flowering plants in the orchid family Orchidaceae

Spiranthes is a genus of orchids in the subfamily Orchidoideae. They are known commonly as ladies tresses, ladies'-tresses, or lady's tresses. The genus is distributed in the Americas, Eurasia, and Australia. The genus name Spiranthes is derived from the Greek speira ("coil") and anthos ("flower"), and was inspired by the spirally arranged inflorescence.

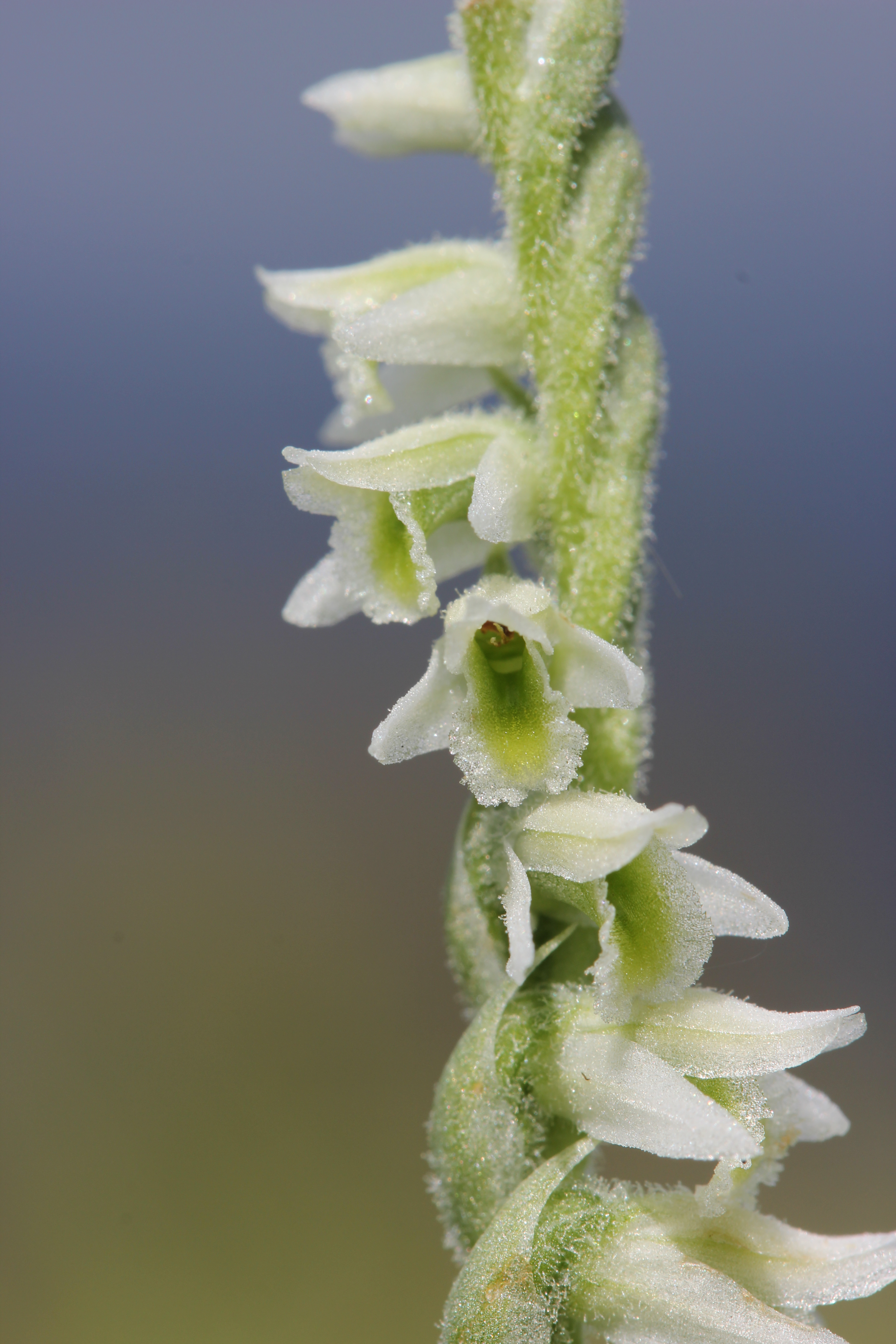
Spiranthes spiralis

== Description ==
These are perennial herbs growing from fleshy root systems that range from slender to tuberous, and are occasionally stoloniferous. Most of the leaves are basal, but some species have leaves higher on the stem before the inflorescence matures, often taking the form of a sheath around the stem. The inflorescence is a terminal spike with flowers arranged in a characteristic loose or dense spiral. As in most other orchids, the flowers are resupinate, twisting during development into an upside-down position. The six tepals may be separate, or the three upper may be joined to form a hood over the lip petal. The lip is thin to somewhat fleshy, and two basal glands produce nectar. The flowers are usually white, cream, ivory, or yellowish, and two species have pink flowers; a few are also fragrant.

== Taxonomy and naming ==
The genus Spiranthes was first formally described in 1817 by Louis Claude Richard in his book De Orchideis Europaeis Annotationes. The genus's name is derived from ancient Greek words meaning "a coil" and "a flower".

Since its original description, the genus has undergone many taxonomic changes. Spiranthes once contained all the species from the subtribe Spiranthinae. In 1920, Spiranthes was split into 24 genera. Revisions in 1951 and 1958 placed more species into the genus. During the 1990s it was divided again.

Spiranthes has recently received increased attention from taxonomists and systematists, leading to new species discovery and the resolution of many long-term taxonomic questions.

It is difficult to clearly define some of the species of this taxon because some of them are polymorphic, taking a number of different forms, with some species belonging to species complexes involving several closely related and morphologically similar species (e.g., the S. cernua species complex; S. parksii, a member of the S. cernua complex and probably a descendant of S. cernua. It has been suggested that this species is just another rare form).

=== Species list ===
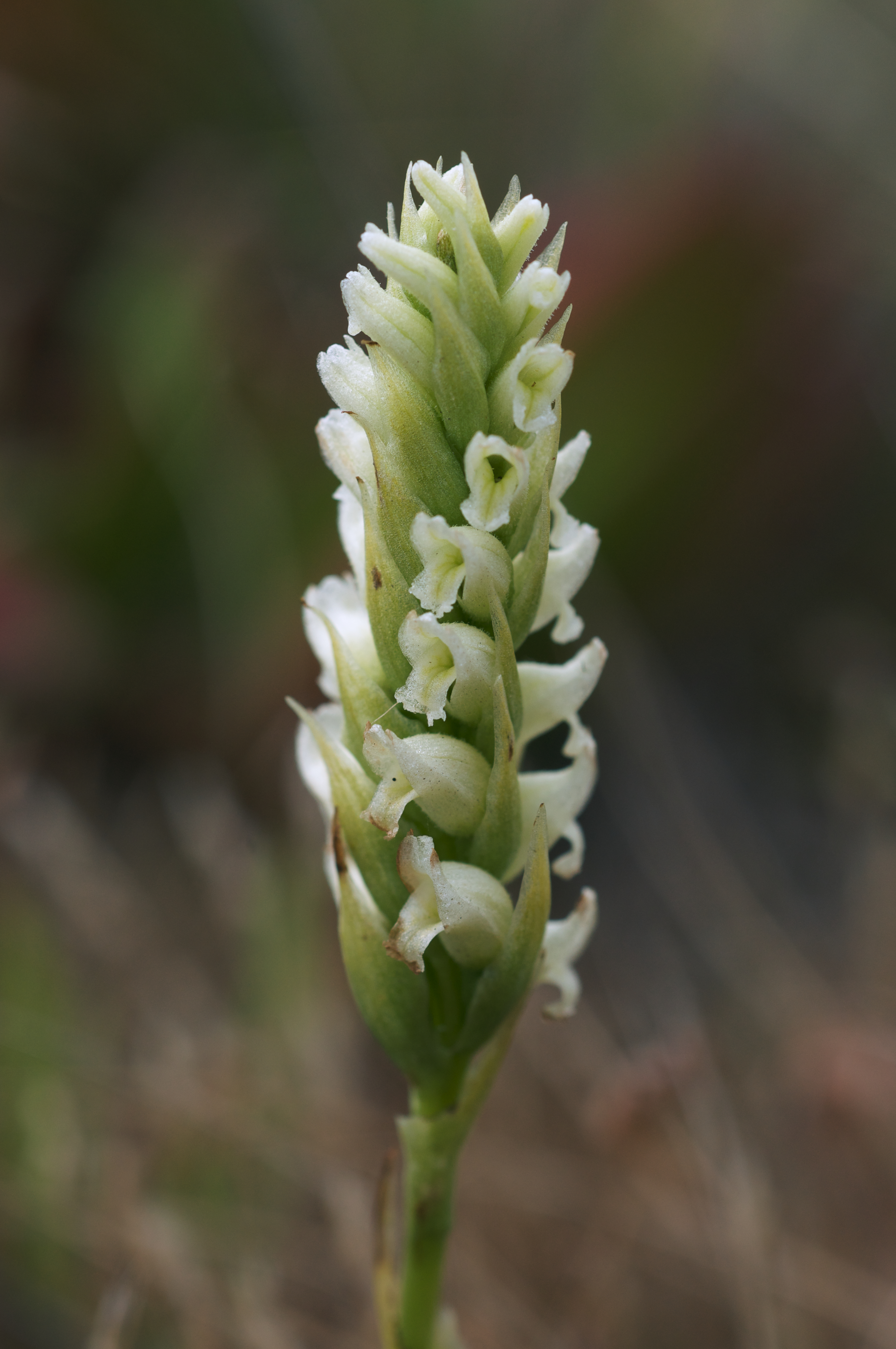
Spiranthes romanzoffiana

The following is a list of species accepted by the World Checklist of Selected Plant Families as at March 2023:

- Spiranthes aestivalis (Poir.) Rich. (1817) – summer-flowering spiranthes (western & central Europe to northwestern Africa)
- Spiranthes arcisepala M.C. Pace (2017) – Appalachian ladies'-tresses (Northeastern US & Maritime Canada)
- Spiranthes australis (R.Br.) Lindl. – Austral ladies tresses (southern Caspian Sea and Himalayan Mountains to the South-West Pacific)
- Spiranthes bightensis M.C. Pace (2021) – Atlantic ladies'-tresses (Mid-Atlantic USA)
- Spiranthes brevilabris Lindl. (1840) – Texas ladies'-tresses (southeastern USA)
- Spiranthes casei Catling & Cruise (1974) – Case's ladies'-tresses (eastern Canada & USA)
  - Spiranthes casei var. casei
  - Spiranthes casei var. novaescotiae Catling (1981) (Nova Scotia)
- Spiranthes cernua (L.) Rich. (1817) – nodding ladies'-tresses (eastern Canada & USA)
- Spiranthes delitescens Sheviak (1990) – reclusive ladies'-tresses (Southeastern Arizona)
- Spiranthes diluvialis Sheviak (1984) – Ute's ladies'-tresses (Rocky Mountains USA)
- Spiranthes × eamesii P.M.Br. (North-eastern U.S.A.)
- Spiranthes eatonii Ames ex P.M.Br. (1999) – Eaton's ladies'-tresses (southeastern USA)
- Spiranthes flexuosa (Sm.) Lindl. (1824) – Nepalese ladies'-tresses (Himalayan Mountains to SE Asia, southern Japan, and Indonesia)
- Spiranthes floridana (Wherry) Cory (1936) – Florida ladies'-tresses (Florida and Texas)
- Spiranthes graminea Lindl. (1840) – Canelo ladies'-tresses (Arizona, Mexico, Honduras, Nicaragua)
- Spiranthes hachijoensis Suetsugu et al. (2023) (Japan)
- Spiranthes × heteroaustralis J.M.H.Shaw (2014) (Florida)
- Spiranthes × hongkongensis S.Y.Hu & Barretto (1976) (South-eastern China, Nansei-shoto, Taiwan, N. Borneo)
- Spiranthes igniorchis M.C. Pace (2017) – fire ladies'-tresses (Florida)
- Spiranthes incurva (Jenn.) M.C. Pace (2017) – Sphinx ladies'-tresses (Midwestern US & southern Canada)
- Spiranthes infernalis Sheviak (1989) – Ash Meadows ladies'-tresses (Nevada)
- Spiranthes × intermedia Ames (1903) (South-eastern Canada to north-eastern U.S.A.)
- Spiranthes × kapnosperia M.C.Pace (2017) – Smoky ladies'-tresses (Smoky Mountains region)
- Spiranthes lacera (Raf.) Raf. (1833) – northern slender ladies'-tresses (central and eastern Canada & USA)
  - Spiranthes lacera var. gracilis (Bigelow) Luer
  - Spiranthes lacera var. lacera
- Spiranthes laciniata (Small) Ames (1905) – lace-lipped ladies'-tresses (southeastern USA)
- Spiranthes longilabris Lindl. (1840) – giant-spiral ladies'-tresses (southeastern USA)
- Spiranthes lucida (H.H.Eaton) Ames (1908) – shining ladies'-tresses (eastern Canada & USA)
- Spiranthes magnicamporum Sheviak (1973) – Great Plains ladies'-tresses (central and eastern Canada & USA)
- Spiranthes maokensis M.C.Pace (2018) (Western New Guinea)
- Spiranthes nebulorum Catling & V.R.Catling (1988) (Mexico, Guatemala)
- Spiranthes niklasii M.C. Pace (2017) – Niklas' ladies'-tresses (Ouachita Mountains)
- Spiranthes ochroleuca (Rydb.) Rydb. (1932) – yellow nodding ladies'-tresses (eastern Canada & USA)
- Spiranthes odorata (Nutt.) Lindl. (1840) – fragrant ladies'-tresses, marsh ladies'-tresses (southeastern USA)
- Spiranthes ovalis Lindl. (1840) – October ladies'-tresses (eastern Canada & USA)
  - Spiranthes ovalis var. erostellata Catling (1983)
  - Spiranthes ovalis var. ovalis Lindl.
- Spiranthes perexilis (Sheviak) M.C. Pace (2019) – Slender starry ladies'-tresses (Sierra Nevada Mountains, USA)
- Spiranthes pitouchaoensis S.S.Ying (2022) (Taiwan)
- Spiranthes porrifolia Lindl. (1840) – leek-leaved ladies'-tresses, creamy ladies'-tresses (western USA)
- Spiranthes praecox (Walter) S.Watson in A.Gray (1890) – early-blooming spiranthes, green-vein ladies'-tresses (eastern USA)
- Spiranthes pusilla (Blume) Miq. (1859) (Sumatra)
- Spiranthes romanzoffiana Cham. (1828) – hooded ladies'-tresses (British Isles, North America)
- Spiranthes × sierrae M.C.Pace (2019) (California)
- Spiranthes × simpsonii Catling & Sheviak (1993) (Southeastern Canada to north-central U.S.A.)
- Spiranthes sinensis (Pers.) Ames (1908) – Chinese Spiranthes (East Asia)
- Spiranthes spiralis (L.) Chevall. (1827) – autumn ladies-tresses, spiraled Spiranthes (Europe, Mediterranean, Caucasus Mountains)
- Spiranthes × stellata P.M.Br., Dueck & K.M.Cameron (2008) (Central California)
- Spiranthes suishaensis (Hayata) Schltr. (1919) – Taiwan ladies'-tresses (Taiwan)
- Spiranthes sunii Boufford & Wen H. Zhang (2008) (Gansu, China)
- Spiranthes sylvatica P.M.Br. (2008) (Florida)
- Spiranthes torta (Thunb.) Garay & H.R.Sweet in R.A.Howard (1974) – southern ladies'-tresses (Florida, Caribbean, Mexico, Central America)
- Spiranthes triloba J.K. Schum. (1898) – Panther ladies'-tresses (Florida)
- Spiranthes tuberosa Raf. (1833) – little ladies'-tresses (eastern USA)
- Spiranthes vernalis Engelm. & A.Gray (1845) – spring ladies'-tresses (North America, Bahamas)
- Spiranthes × zahlbruckneri H.Fleischm. (1910) (Europe)

== Ecology ==
=== Pollination ===
Spiranthes are primarily pollinated by bumblebees, however other bee genera also pollinate various species, including halictid bees, and honey bees (particularly in Europe and Asia).
