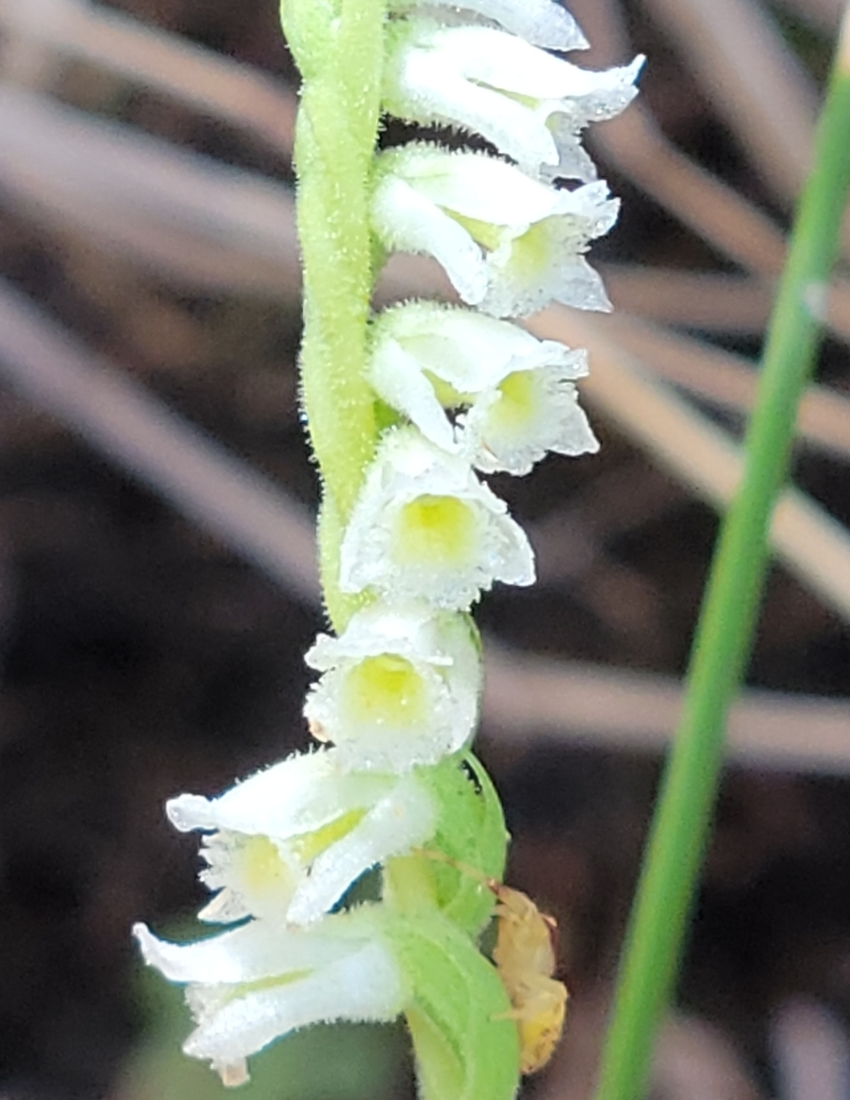

Conservation status
- Endangered (IUCN 3.1)

Scientific classification
- Kingdom: Plantae
- Clade: Tracheophytes
- Clade: Angiosperms
- Clade: Monocots
- Order: Asparagales
- Family: Orchidaceae
- Subfamily: Orchidoideae
- Tribe: Cranichideae
- Genus: Spiranthes
- Species: S. brevilabris

Binomial name
- Spiranthes brevilabris Lindl.

= Spiranthes brevilabris =

Short lipped ladies' tresses

Species of orchid

Spiranthes brevilabris, the short lipped ladies' tresses or Texas lady's tresses is a rare and endangered orchid native to the southeastern United States.

== Variations ==
There are two recognized variations:

- Spiranthes brevilabris var. brevilabris
- Spiranthes brevilabris var. floridana

== Description ==
Spiranthes brevilabris plants are 7–40 cm tall, with 3-5 basal leaves usually present when flowering. Flowers are arranged in a spiral around the stem, with a cream white to ivory yellow color. The inside of the lip is yellow. Bloom time is February to April.

== Distribution and habitat ==
Spiranthes brevilabris can be found in Florida and Texas, with historic records from Mississippi, Louisiana, Georgia and Alabama but assumed to be extirpated in those states. It grows in wet pine savannas and moist meadows and roadsides.

== Taxonomy ==
Spiranthes brevilabris was first described by John Lindley in 1840.
