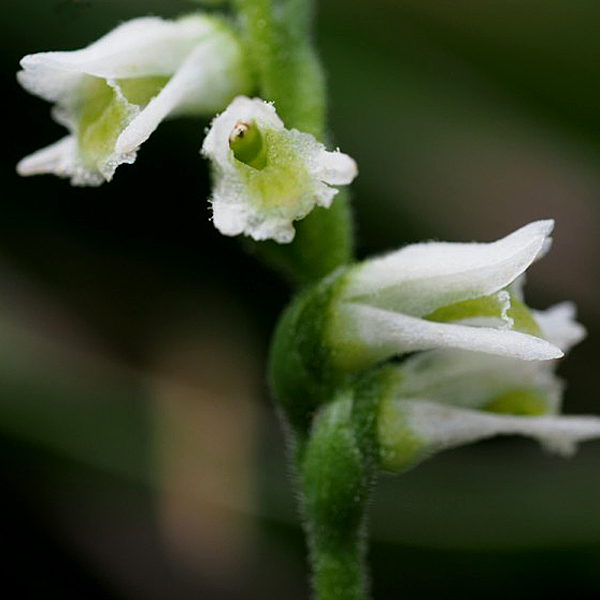
- Inflorescence

Scientific classification
- Kingdom: Plantae
- Clade: Tracheophytes
- Clade: Angiosperms
- Clade: Monocots
- Order: Asparagales
- Family: Orchidaceae
- Subfamily: Orchidoideae
- Tribe: Cranichideae
- Genus: Spiranthes
- Species: S. torta

Binomial name
- Spiranthes torta (Thunb.) Garay & H.R.Sweet
- distribution range, from GBIF

= Spiranthes torta =

Southern ladies tresses

Species of orchid

Spiranthes torta, the Southern ladies’ tresses, is a terrestrial orchid native to Florida, Mexico, Central America, the Caribbean Islands and Bermuda.

== Description ==
Spiranthes torta plants are 7–50 cm tall and have 2-3 basal leaves which wither before they bloom. There is also several leaves along the stem which are reduced to bracts. Flowers are arranged in a spiral along the stem. They are white, with a green inside of the labellum. Bloom time is May to June.

== Distribution and habitat ==
Spiranthes torta can be found in the Bahamas, Belize, Bermuda, Costa Rica, Cuba, the Dominican Republic, Florida, French Guiana, Guatemala, Haiti, Honduras, Jamaica, the Leeward Islands, the Gulf of Mexico, southeastern Mexico, Nicaragua, Puerto Rico, Trinidad-Tobago and the Windward Islands. It prefers dry habitat, usually growing in pine forest.

== Taxonomy ==
Spiranthes torta was first described by Carl Peter Thunberg in 1791 (as Ophrys torta).
