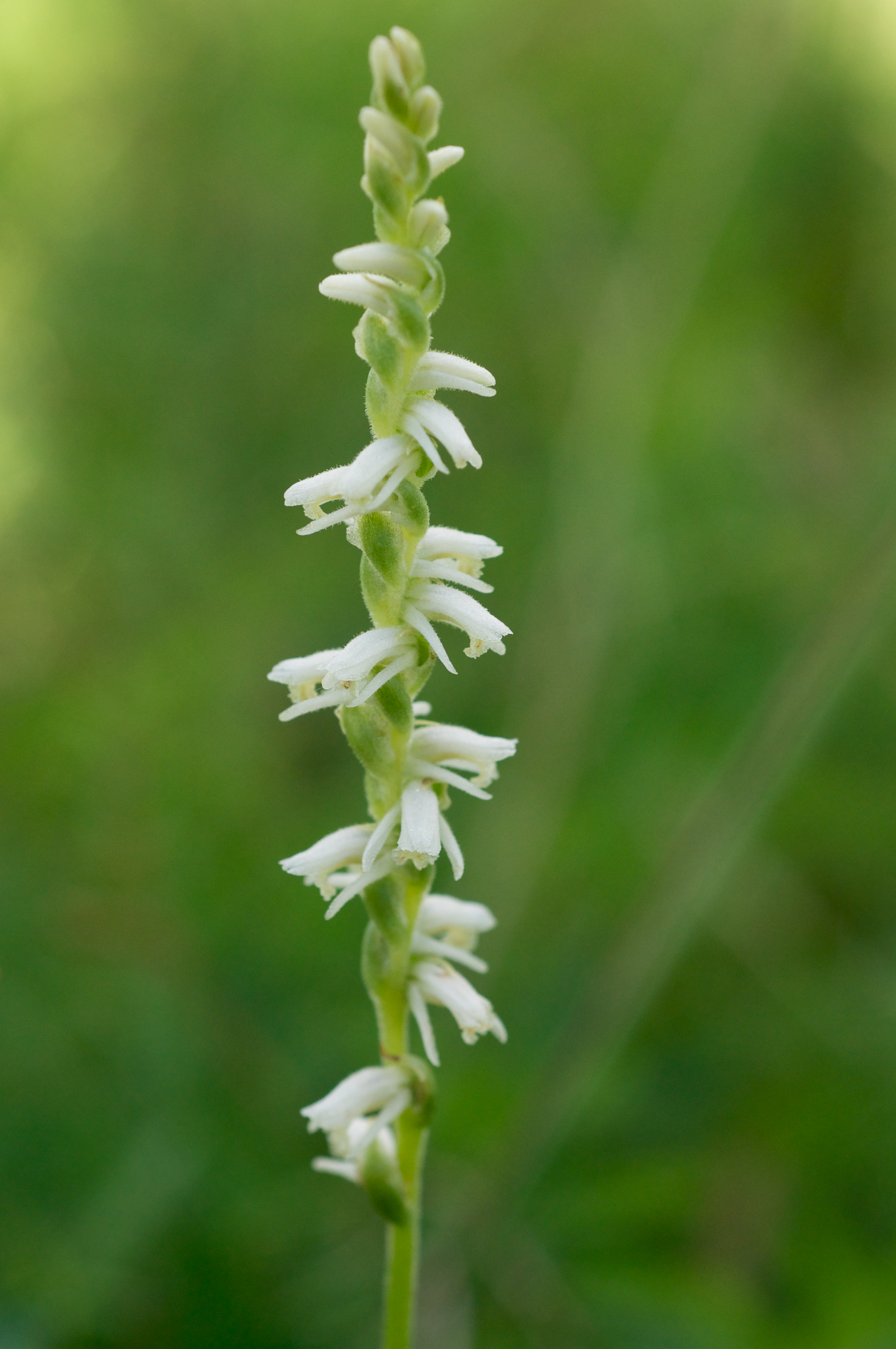

Scientific classification
- Kingdom: Plantae
- Clade: Embryophytes
- Clade: Tracheophytes
- Clade: Spermatophytes
- Clade: Angiosperms
- Clade: Monocots
- Order: Asparagales
- Family: Orchidaceae
- Subfamily: Orchidoideae
- Tribe: Cranichideae
- Genus: Spiranthes
- Species: S. vernalis

Binomial name
- Spiranthes vernalis Engelm. & A.Gray

= Spiranthes vernalis =

Species of orchid

Spiranthes vernalis, commonly called the spring ladies'-tresses, is a species of orchid that is native to North America, Central America and the Bahamas.

It is a perennial that produces a spiral of white flowers in the early summer.
