= Spiranthes graminea =

Canelo lady's tresses

Scientific classification
- Kingdom: Plantae
- Clade: Tracheophytes
- Clade: Angiosperms
- Clade: Monocots
- Order: Asparagales
- Family: Orchidaceae
- Subfamily: Orchidoideae
- Tribe: Cranichideae
- Genus: Spiranthes
- Species: S. graminea

Binomial name
- Spiranthes graminea Lindl.

Species of orchid

Spiranthes graminea or the Canelo lady's tresses is a species of orchid found in Mexico and Central America.

== Distribution and habitat ==
Spiranthes graminea has been found in Belize, Guatemala, Honduras, Mexico and Nicaragua.

== Taxonomy ==
The species was published in 1840 by John Lindley, under the current name of Spiranthes graminea. Plants collected in 1968 in Arizona were first thought to be Spiranthes graminea (and are still listed by some publications as occurring in the US), but the plants found in the US were moved to their own species in 1990, Spiranthes delitescens.
