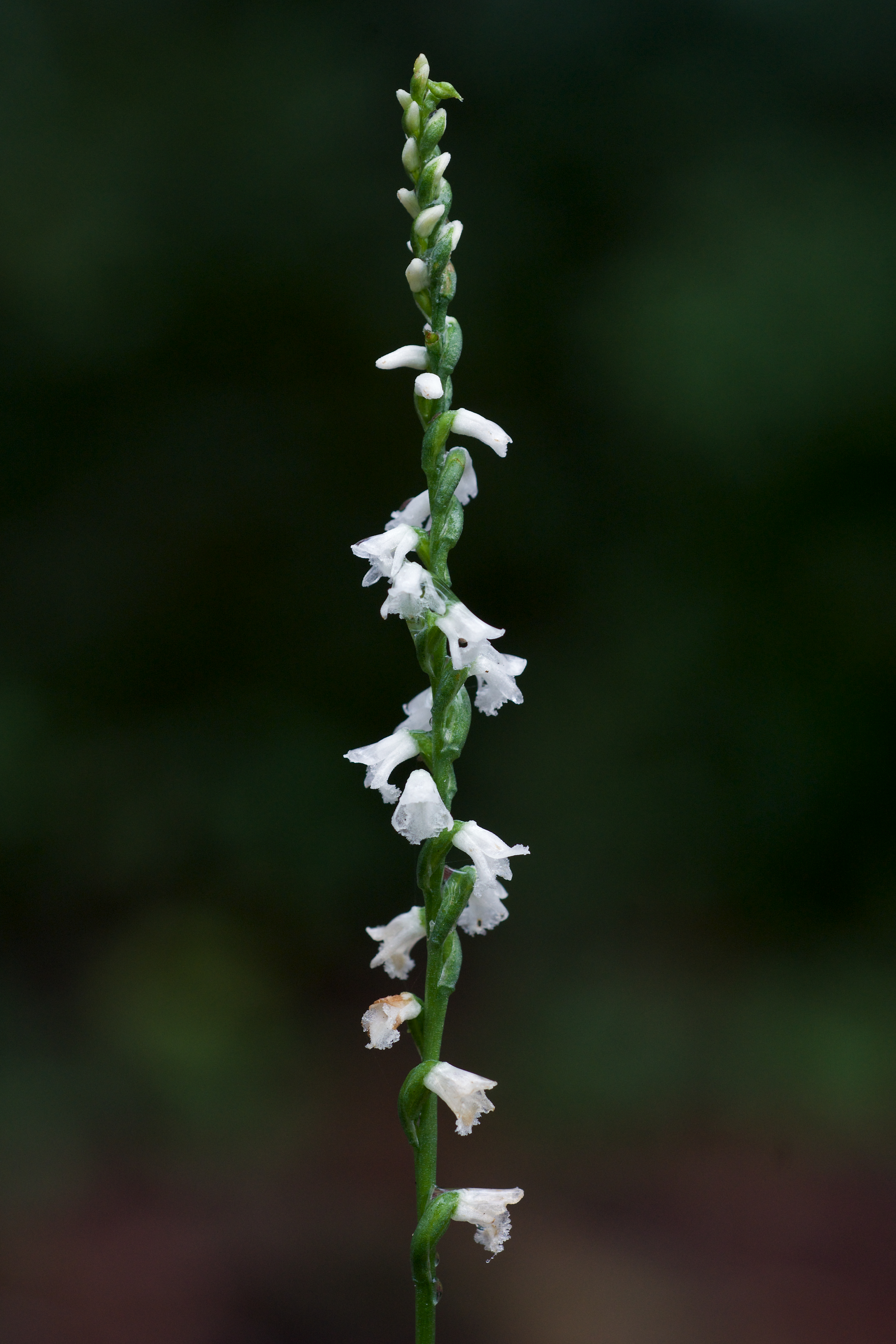

Scientific classification
- Kingdom: Plantae
- Clade: Tracheophytes
- Clade: Angiosperms
- Clade: Monocots
- Order: Asparagales
- Family: Orchidaceae
- Subfamily: Orchidoideae
- Tribe: Cranichideae
- Genus: Spiranthes
- Species: S. tuberosa

Binomial name
- Spiranthes tuberosa Raf.

Synonyms
- Spiranthes grayi; Spiranthes tuberosa var. grayi

= Spiranthes tuberosa =

Species of flowering plant

Spiranthes tuberosa, commonly called little lady's tresses, little pearl-twist and slender ladies'-tresses is an orchid species. It is a perennial plant native to North America.

The basal leaves are short-lived, blooming plants having pure white flowers spirally arranged around the single-stemmed inflorescence; the plants grow in grasslands and open woods.

== Legal status ==
It is listed as a special concern in Connecticut, as threatened in Florida, as exploitably vulnerable in New York (state), as endangered in Pennsylvania, and as endangered in Rhode Island.
