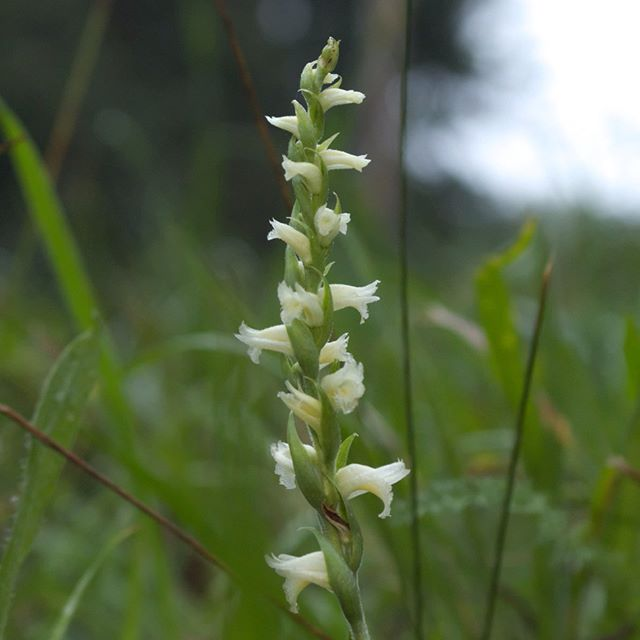

Scientific classification
- Kingdom: Plantae
- Clade: Tracheophytes
- Clade: Angiosperms
- Clade: Monocots
- Order: Asparagales
- Family: Orchidaceae
- Subfamily: Orchidoideae
- Tribe: Cranichideae
- Genus: Spiranthes
- Species: S. ochroleuca

Binomial name
- Spiranthes ochroleuca (Rydb.) Rydb.

Synonyms
- Gyrostachys ochroleuca Rydb. (basionym); Ibidium ochroleucum (Rydb.) House; Triorchis ochroleuca (Rydb.) Nieuwl.; Ibidium cernuum var. ochroleucum (Rydb.) House; Triorchis cernua var. ochroleuca (Rydb.) Farw.; Spiranthes steigeri Correll

= Spiranthes ochroleuca =

Yellow nodding ladies'-tresses

Species of orchid

Spiranthes ochroleuca, commonly called the yellow nodding lady's tresses, is a species of orchid occurring from southeastern Canada to the eastern United States.

== Distribution and habitat ==
Spiranthes ochroleuca is native in eastern Canada (New Brunswick, Nova Scotia, Ontario and Prince Edward Island), throughout the Northeastern United States, and in the southeastern United States (Kentucky, Maryland, North Carolina, South Carolina, Tennessee and Virginia). Its habitats include open woodlands, thickets, meadows, barrens, ledges, outcrops, banks and roadsides.
