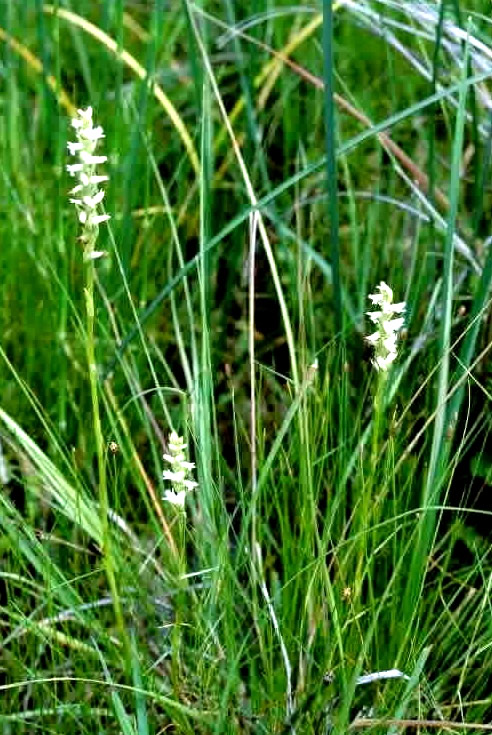

Conservation status
- Critically Imperiled (NatureServe)

Scientific classification
- Kingdom: Plantae
- Clade: Tracheophytes
- Clade: Angiosperms
- Clade: Monocots
- Order: Asparagales
- Family: Orchidaceae
- Subfamily: Orchidoideae
- Tribe: Cranichideae
- Genus: Spiranthes
- Species: S. delitescens

Binomial name
- Spiranthes delitescens Sheviak

= Spiranthes delitescens =

Species of plant

Spiranthes delitescens is a rare species of orchid known by the common names reclusive lady's tresses, Canelo Hills lady's tresses, and Madrean lady's tresses. It is native to Arizona in the United States, where there are only four occurrences. It is threatened by the loss and degradation of its habitat. It is a federally listed endangered species of the United States.

This orchid was first collected in 1968 and described to science as a species in 1990. It produces an erect stem up to 50 centimeters tall. The narrow leaves are arranged around the lower part of the stem and are up to 18 centimeters long. The inflorescence is a spiraling spike of flowers. The stem in the inflorescence is covered in glandular hairs. Each flower has curving white, cream, or yellow-tinged petals nearly one centimeter in length. Blooming occurs in July and August. This and other orchid species depend on mycorrhizae, soil-dwelling fungi species, to assist with germination, and for nutrition.

This plant grows in cienegas, a wetland habitat type in an otherwise dry region in the southwestern United States, at an elevation around 1525 meters (5000 feet). Other plants in the habitat include a variety of grasses, sedges, spikerushes, cat-tails, and horse-tails. Cienegas are kept seasonally wet by springs. Two of the cienegas occupied by the orchid are the O'Donnell and Turkey Creek Cienegas, located about 40 kilometers southeast of Tucson, Arizona. The O'Donnell Cienega is owned by The Nature Conservancy, and a permanent caretaker lives at the site. The other two occurrences are Babocomari Cienega and Sheehy Spring nearby. The orchid may also exist south of the border in Sonora, Mexico. It is difficult to estimate the orchid's abundance, because it spends most of its time in a dormant, or vegetative state, remaining hidden in the dense surrounding vegetation with few identifiable aboveground parts.

The main threat to the species is the loss and degradation of its habitat, caused in part by the invasion of non-native plant species and the overgrowth of native plants. The worst invasive species is Johnson grass (Sorghum halepense). The orchid grows naturally next to various species of horse-tail and other marsh plants, and when these plants become too dense the orchid cannot penetrate the layers of vegetation. Horse-tails also outcompete the orchid. It is likely that fire suppression is a threat, as fires naturally thin competing vegetation. Grazing of cattle and other livestock is a threat, though grazing has been eliminated in the most sensitive cienega sites in most locations. Changes in the hydrology of these wetland sites is a threat to the habitat, which is still recovering from draining operations initiated over a century ago. Pumping of groundwater reduces available water in the habitat.

The specific name delitescens is derived from the Latin delitescere meaning "to hide", "to withdraw" or "to take refuge".
