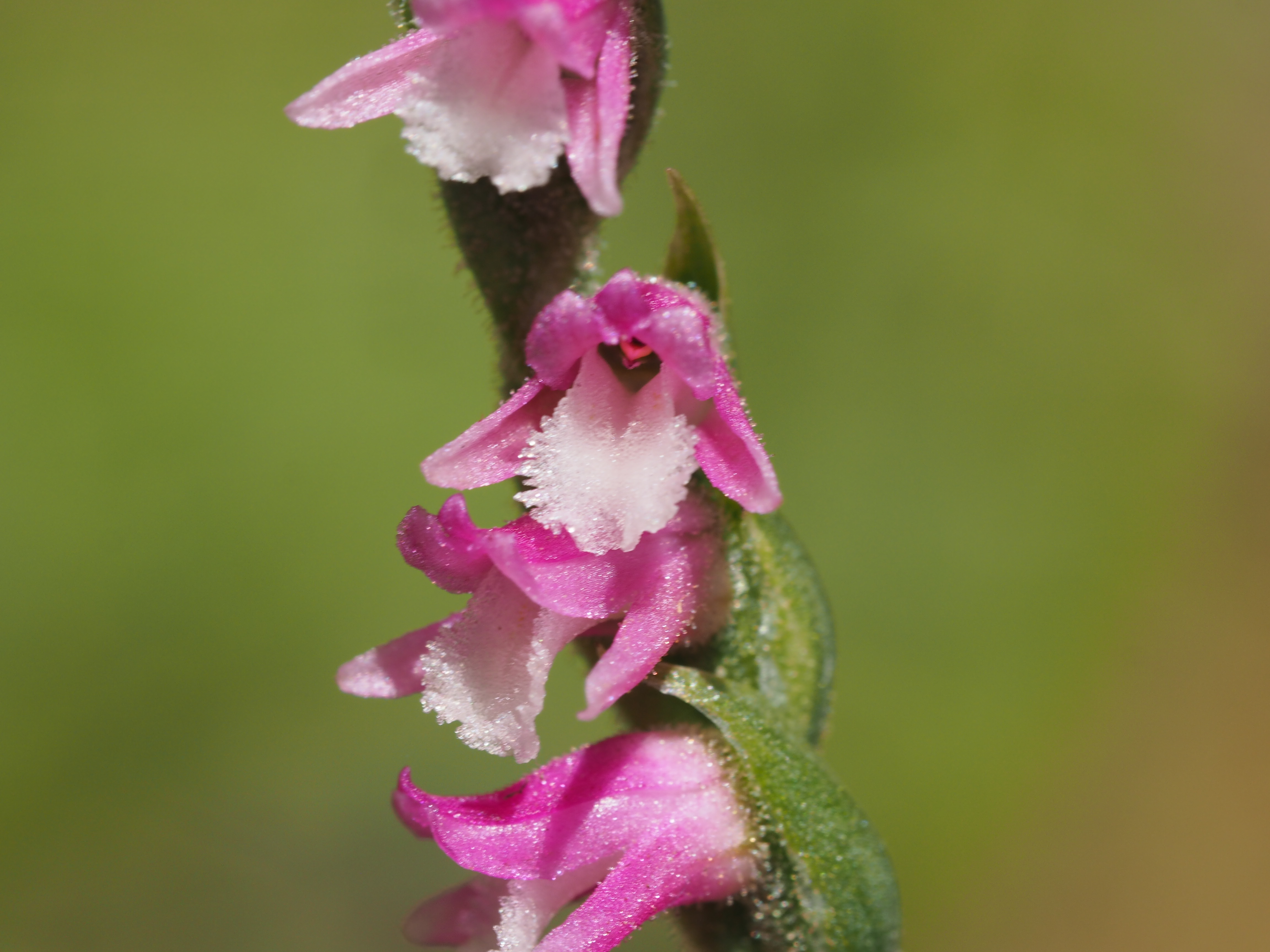

Scientific classification
- Kingdom: Plantae
- Clade: Tracheophytes
- Clade: Angiosperms
- Clade: Monocots
- Order: Asparagales
- Family: Orchidaceae
- Subfamily: Orchidoideae
- Tribe: Cranichideae
- Genus: Spiranthes
- Species: S. australis

Binomial name
- Spiranthes australis (R.Br.) Lindl.
- Geographic range of Spiranthes australis orchid.

Synonyms
- List: Calanthe australis (R.Br.) Aiton; Gyrostachys australis (R.Br.) Blume; Monustes australis (R.Br.) Raf.; Neottia australis R.Br.); Spiranthes sinensis subsp. australis (R.Br.) Kitam.; Spiranthes sinensis var. australis (R.Br.) H.Hara & S.Kitam.; Gyrostachys australis var. amoena (M.Bieb.) Blume; Gyrostachys congesta (Lindl.) Kuntze; Gyrostachys novifuburgensis Kuntze; Gyrostachys stylites (Lindl.) Kuntze; Gyrostachys wightiana (Lindl. ex Wall.) Kuntze; Ibidium viridiflorum (Makino) Makino; Neottia amoena M.Bieb.; Neottia crispata Blume; Neottia parviflora Sm.; Ophrys spiralis Georgi nom. illeg.; Spiranthes alticola D.L.Jones; Spiranthes amoena (M.Bieb.) Spreng.; Spiranthes angustilabris J.J.Sm.; Spiranthes australis var. tasmaniensis Schltr.; Spiranthes australis var. viridiflora Makino; Spiranthes congesta Lindl.; Spiranthes crispata (Blume) Zoll. & Moritzi; Spiranthes elytra D.L.Jones & R.J.Bates; Spiranthes longispicata A.Rich.; Spiranthes novae-zelandiae Hook.f.; Spiranthes parviflora (Sm.) Lindl.; Spiranthes sinensis var. amoena (M.Bieb.) H.Hara; Spiranthes stylites Lindl.; Spiranthes viridiflora (Makino) Makino; Spiranthes wightiana Lindl. ex Wall. nom. nud.

= Spiranthes australis =

Austral ladies' tresses

Species of plant

Spiranthes australis, commonly known as austral ladies tresses, is a species of orchid that grows from southern Caspian Sea and Himalayan Mountains to the South-West Pacific and north throughout Japan. It has up to about ten leaves at the base of a flowering stem with up to sixty small pink and white flowers spirally arranged around it.

== Description ==
Spiranthes australis is a terrestrial, perennial, deciduous, herb with between three and ten linear to lance-shaped or spatula-shaped dark green leaves which are 80–180 mm (3–7 in) long and 6–10 mm (0.2–0.4 in) wide. Between ten and sixty bright pink flowers are crowded and spirally arranged along a flowering spike 250–450 mm (10–20 in) tall. The flowers are 4–5 mm (0.16–0.20 in) long and 3–4 mm (0.1–0.2 in) wide, ranging from deep pink to pure white. The dorsal sepal is lance-shaped to egg-shaped, 4–5 mm (0.16–0.20 in) long and 2.5 mm (0.1 in) wide. The lateral sepals and petals are a similar size to the dorsal sepal but narrower. The labellum is white, has three obscure lobes and is about 6 mm (0.2 in) long. The labellum has a grainy texture and its edges are crinkled. Flowering occurs from October to March or later but the flowers are self-pollinating.

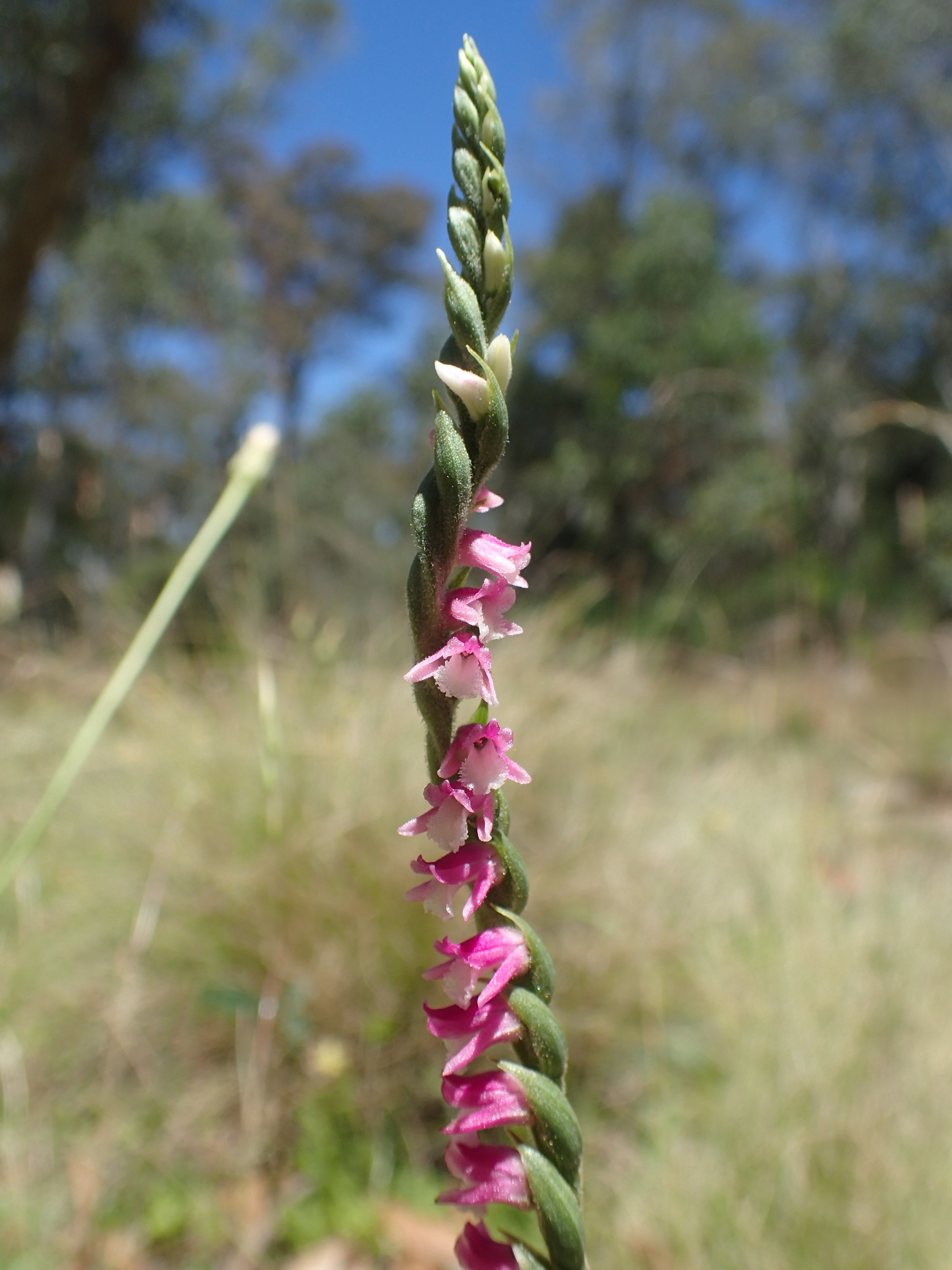
Flower spike of S. australis in Barrington Tops National Park

== Taxonomy and naming ==
Spiranthes australis was first formally described in 1810 by Robert Brown and the description was published in Prodromus Florae Novae Hollandiae et Insulae Van Diemen. The specific epithet (australis) is a Latin word meaning "southern". The taxonomic concept of this species was expanded in 2019, and its relationship with Spiranthes sinensis clarified.

== Distribution and habitat ==
Austral ladies' tresses usually grows in boggy or swampy places but also in high-rainfall grassy places.

It is widely distributed from the southern Caspian Sea of Iran and Georgia (reported as S. amoena, synonym of S. australis).

Spiranthes australis is the most well-known orchid in Japan. It is first attested in the Manyoshu collection of poetry, which was compiled ca. 760 CE. It is found in common places such as balconies, private gardens, and lawns. It is also seen in parks in natural spaces.

In Australia, it occurs from Queensland, south through eastern New South Wales, the Australian Capital Territory and Victoria to Tasmania. It is sometimes also found in South Australia.

== Conservation ==
Spiranthes australis is common throughout most of its range but is classed as "Rare" in South Australia where it is only known from the Mount Compass area.

== Use in horticulture ==
This orchid is relatively easy to grow in a well-drained, sandy potting mix. It sometimes occurs as a weed in commercial nurseries.
