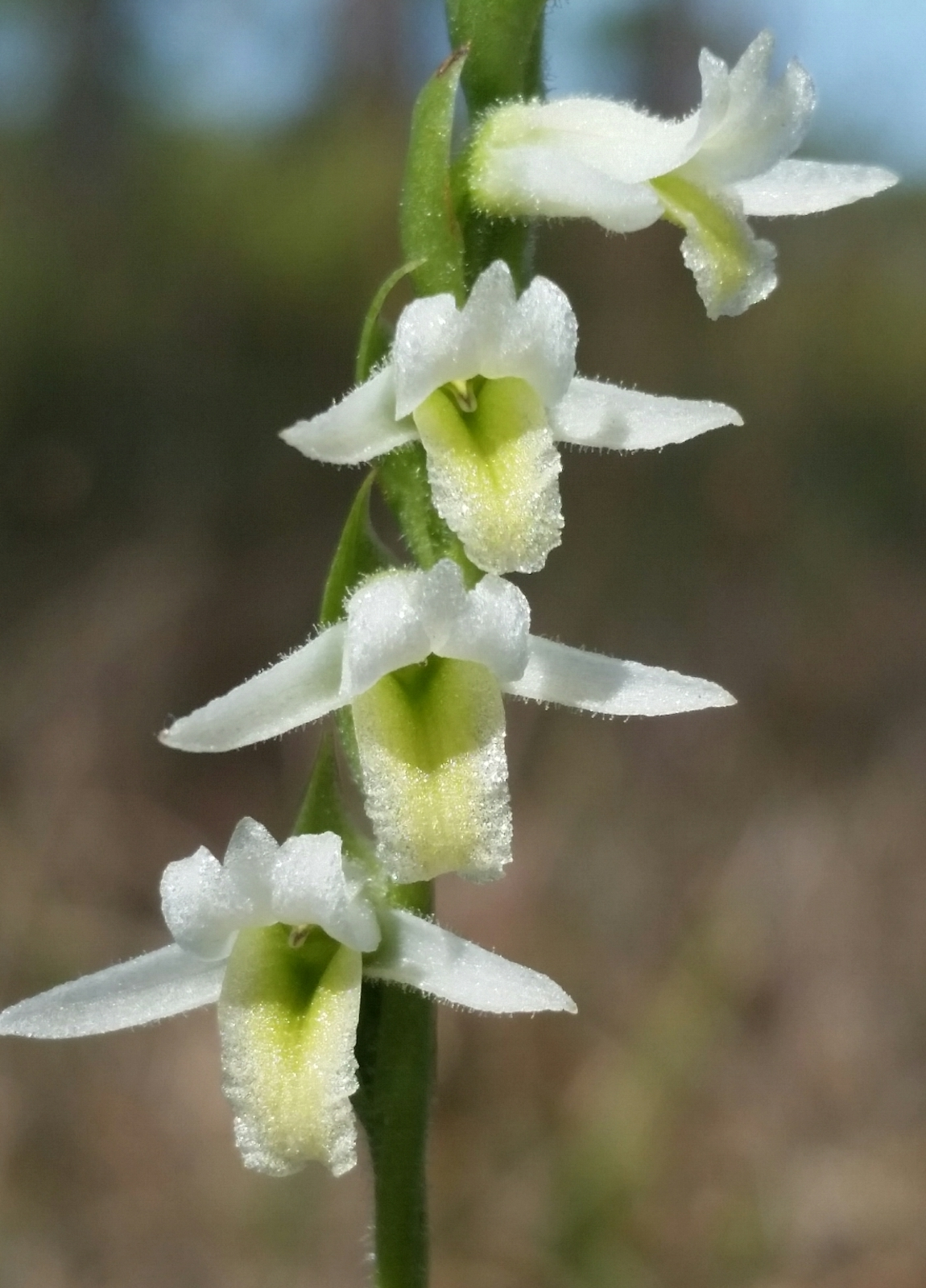
- Inflorescence

Scientific classification
- Kingdom: Plantae
- Clade: Tracheophytes
- Clade: Angiosperms
- Clade: Monocots
- Order: Asparagales
- Family: Orchidaceae
- Subfamily: Orchidoideae
- Tribe: Cranichideae
- Genus: Spiranthes
- Species: S. longilabris

Binomial name
- Spiranthes longilabris Lindl.

= Spiranthes longilabris =

Long lipped ladies' tresses

Species of orchid

Spiranthes longilabris, the long lipped ladies' tresses is an orchid endemic to the southeastern United States.

== Description ==
Spiranthes longilabris plants are 15–50 cm tall, with 3-5 basal leaves either present or absent when flowering. There are 10-30 flowers arranged in a spiral around the stem, with a white to cream white color. The inside of the lip is yellow. Compared to other spiranthes species it has a long lip and the two lateral sepals are spreading to the outside. Bloom time is October to December.

== Distribution and habitat ==
Spiranthes longilabris can be found in Alabama, Florida, Georgia, Louisiana, Mississippi, North Carolina, South Carolina, Texas, Virginia.

It grows in the coastal plain with a maximum elevation of 50 m, in dry and moist grassland as well as woodland.

== Taxonomy ==
Spiranthes longilabris was first described by John Lindley in 1840.
