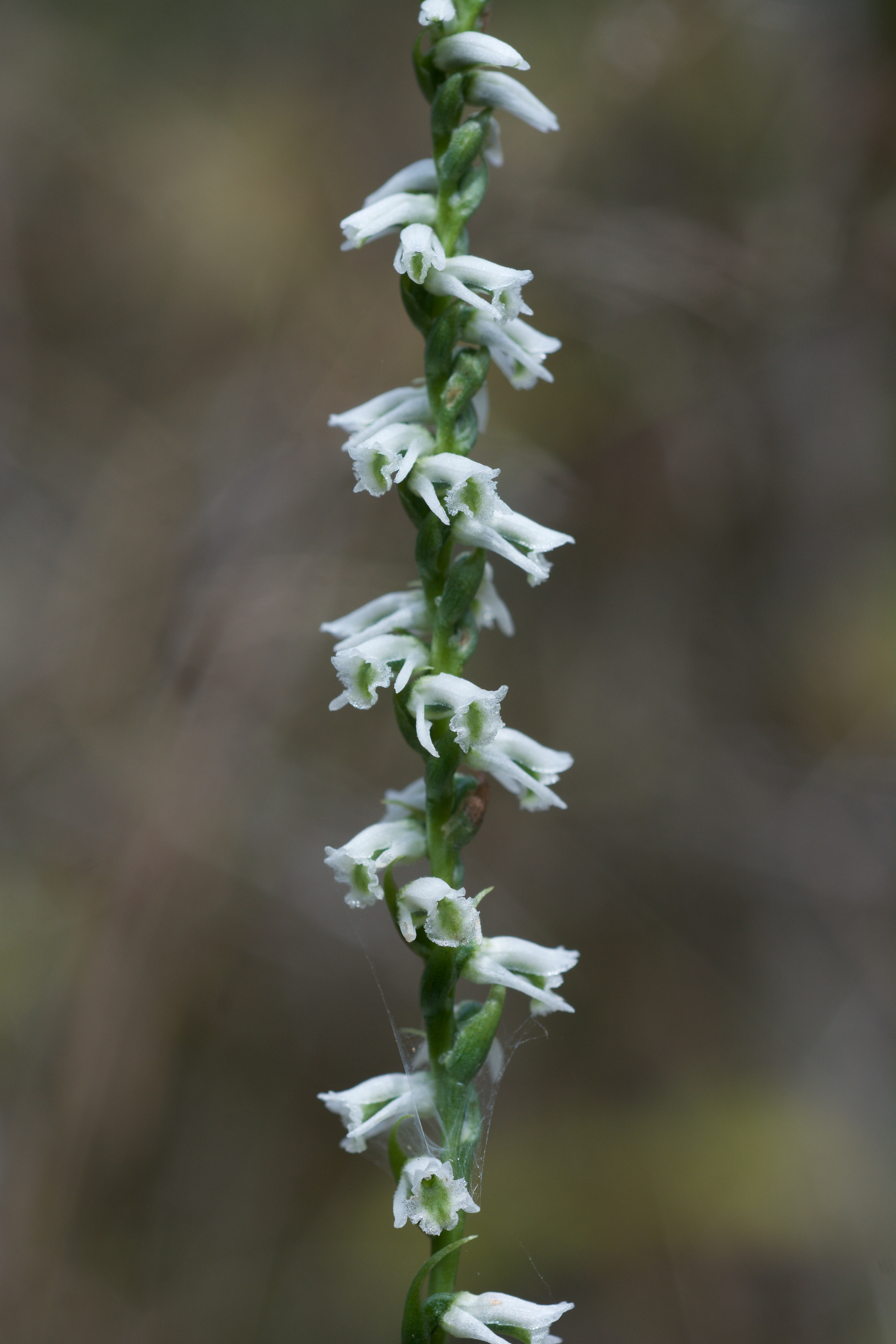
- S. lacera var. gracilis

Scientific classification
- Kingdom: Plantae
- Clade: Tracheophytes
- Clade: Angiosperms
- Clade: Monocots
- Order: Asparagales
- Family: Orchidaceae
- Subfamily: Orchidoideae
- Tribe: Cranichideae
- Genus: Spiranthes
- Species: S. lacera

Binomial name
- Spiranthes lacera (Raf.) Raf.

= Spiranthes lacera =

Slender ladies'-tresses

Species of orchid

Spiranthes lacera, commonly called the slender ladies'-tresses, is a species of orchid that is native to Eastern North America. It has a widespread range and is found in a variety of open habitats, both natural and disturbed. It produces a spiral of white flowers in the summer.

There are two varieties recognized:

- S. lacera var. gracilis - Southern slender ladies' tresses, flowers more densely arranged in spiral, blooming later (late-July through August). Plant hairless and leaves usually absent at flowering.
- S. lacera var. lacera - Northern slender ladies' tresses, flowers more loosely arranged in spiral, blooming earlier (mid-July). Plant hairy and leaves usually present at flowering.
