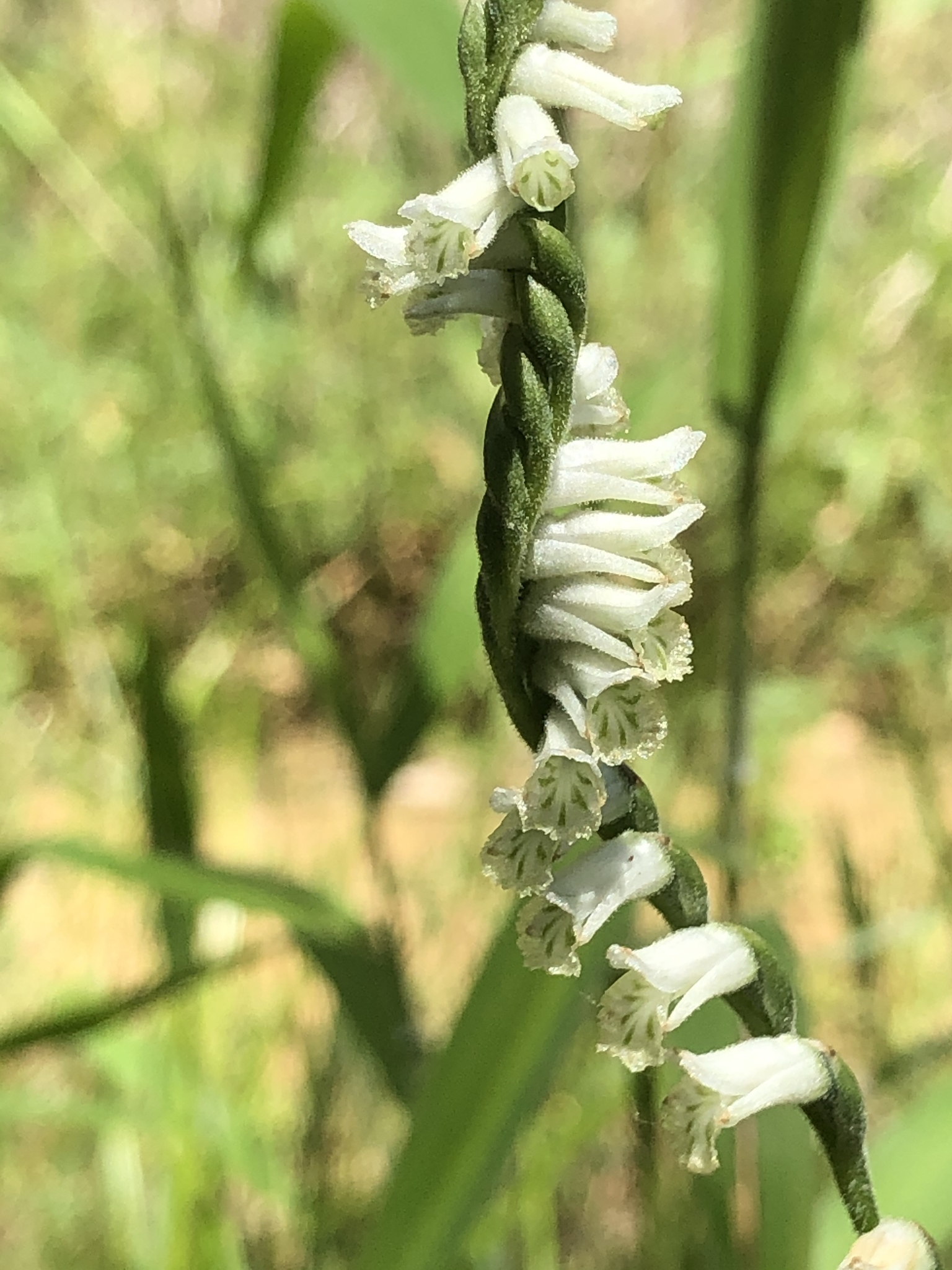

Scientific classification
- Kingdom: Plantae
- Clade: Tracheophytes
- Clade: Angiosperms
- Clade: Monocots
- Order: Asparagales
- Family: Orchidaceae
- Subfamily: Orchidoideae
- Tribe: Cranichideae
- Genus: Spiranthes
- Species: S. praecox

Binomial name
- Spiranthes praecox (Walter) S. Watson
- Recorded occurrences, from GBIF

= Spiranthes praecox =

Grass leaved ladies' tresses

Species of orchid

Spiranthes praecox, the grass leaved ladies' tresses (sometimes spelled grassleaf ladies'-tresses), green-vein ladies'-tresses or sometimes giant ladies' tresses is a terrestrial orchid endemic to the United States, growing on the eastern coastal plains and around the Gulf Coast.

== Description ==
Spiranthes praecox is a herbaceous species growing 20–75 cm high, with up to 7 long basal leaves. There are up to 40 white flowers arranged in a spiral around the stem. The lip of each flower has prominent, branched green colored veins. Bloom time is mainly from February to June (or even later at the northern range extent).

Form Spiranthes praecox forma albolabia has pure white lips with yellowish instead of green veins.

== Distribution and habitat ==
Spiranthes praecox is native to Alabama, Arkansas, Delaware, Florida, Georgia, Louisiana, Maryland, Mississippi, Missouri, New Jersey, North Carolina, Oklahoma, South Carolina, Texas, Virginia.

It grows in coastal planes in dry to moist prairies, meadows, pinelands, and bogs.

== Taxonomy ==
Spiranthes praecox was first described by Thomas Walter in 1788 (as Limodorum praecox).
