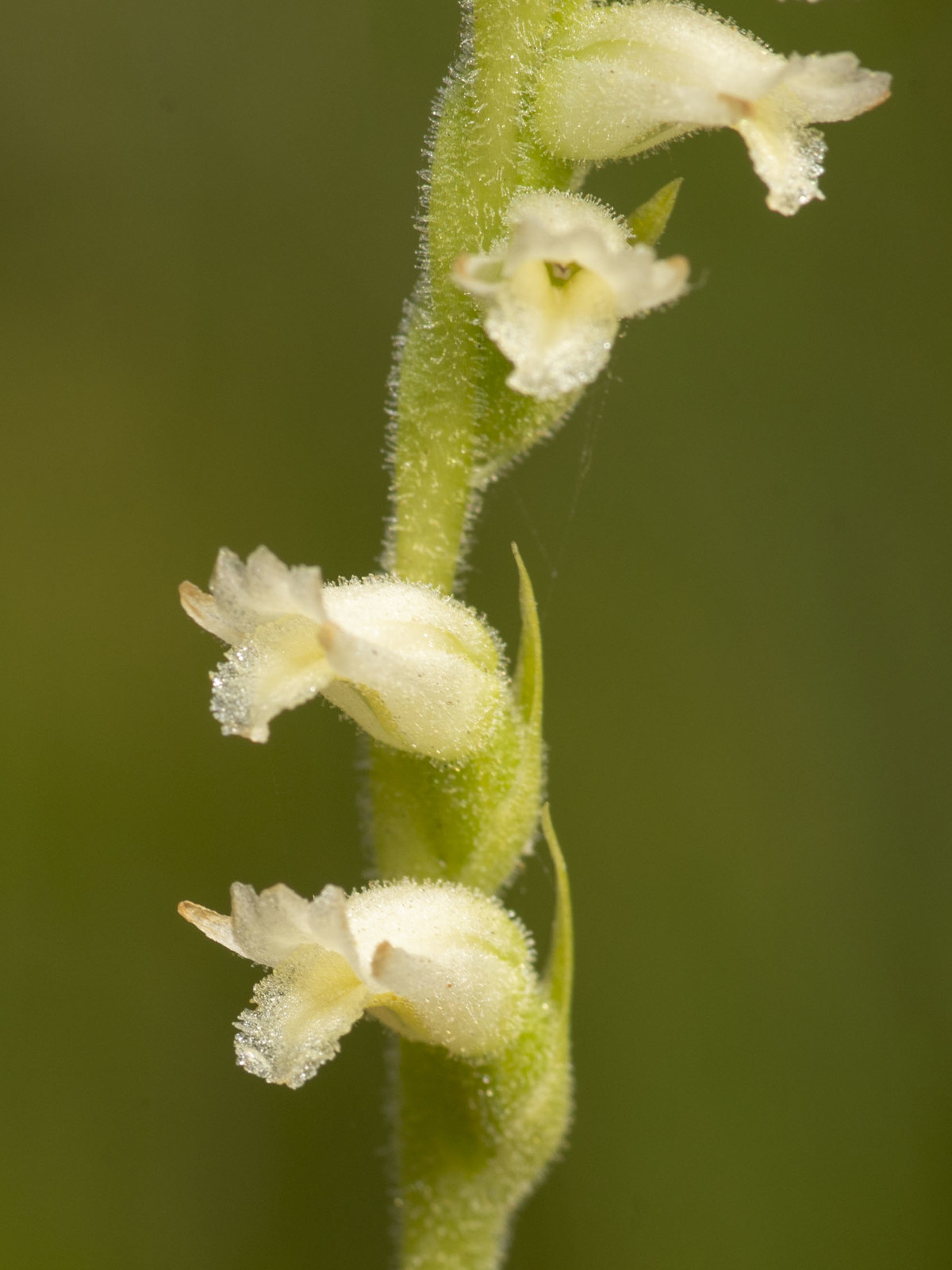

Scientific classification
- Kingdom: Plantae
- Clade: Tracheophytes
- Clade: Angiosperms
- Clade: Monocots
- Order: Asparagales
- Family: Orchidaceae
- Subfamily: Orchidoideae
- Tribe: Cranichideae
- Genus: Spiranthes
- Species: S. laciniata

Binomial name
- Spiranthes laciniata (Small) Ames

= Spiranthes laciniata =

Lacelip ladies' tresses

Species of orchid

Spiranthes laciniata, the lacelip ladies' tresses is a terrestrial orchid endemic to the south eastern United States.

== Description ==
Spiranthes laciniata plants are a tall species of Spiranthes reaching a height of 20–95 cm, with up to 5 basal leaves persisting through anthesis. The flowers are white to cream-white and arranged in a spiral around the stem. The lip is usually yellow in the center. Bloom time is from May to (at its northern range) September.

== Distribution and habitat ==
Spiranthes laciniata is native to the southeastern coastal plains, from Texas in the south all the way to New Jersey in the north.

It is a wetland plant and grows in swamps and marshes, sometimes even in standing water.

== Taxonomy ==
The Spiranthes laciniata name was first published by Oakes Ames in 1905, after John Kunkel Small had described the plants in 1903 as Gyrostachys laciniata.
