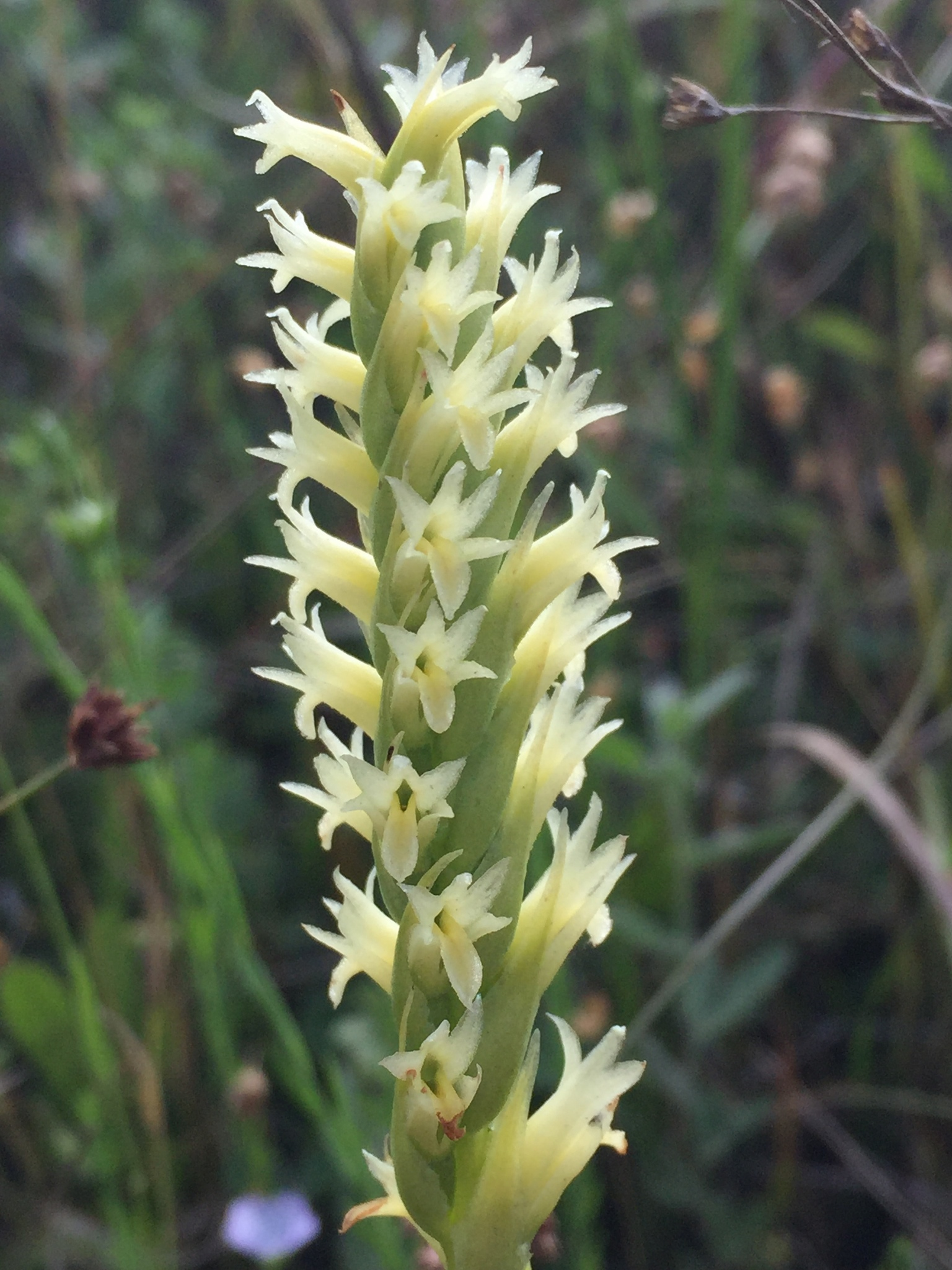

Conservation status
- Apparently Secure (NatureServe)

Scientific classification
- Kingdom: Plantae
- Clade: Tracheophytes
- Clade: Angiosperms
- Clade: Monocots
- Order: Asparagales
- Family: Orchidaceae
- Subfamily: Orchidoideae
- Tribe: Cranichideae
- Genus: Spiranthes
- Species: S. porrifolia

Binomial name
- Spiranthes porrifolia Lindl.

= Spiranthes porrifolia =

Species of orchid

Spiranthes porrifolia is a species of orchid known by the common names creamy lady's tresses and western ladies' tresses. It is native to the western United States from Washington and Idaho to southern California. It can be found in moist habitats, such as mountain meadows, swamps, fens, and riverbanks. It is a perennial herb growing from a tuberous root system, reaching a maximum height around 60 cm (24 in). The leaves are mainly located around the base of the erect stem. They are linear or lance-shaped, or sometimes nearly oval. The top of the stem is occupied by the inflorescence, a dense spiral of many flowers. Each flower is somewhat tubular, with an upper and lower lip, and cream to yellowish in color.

The specific epithet porrifolia is Latin for "leek-leaved".
