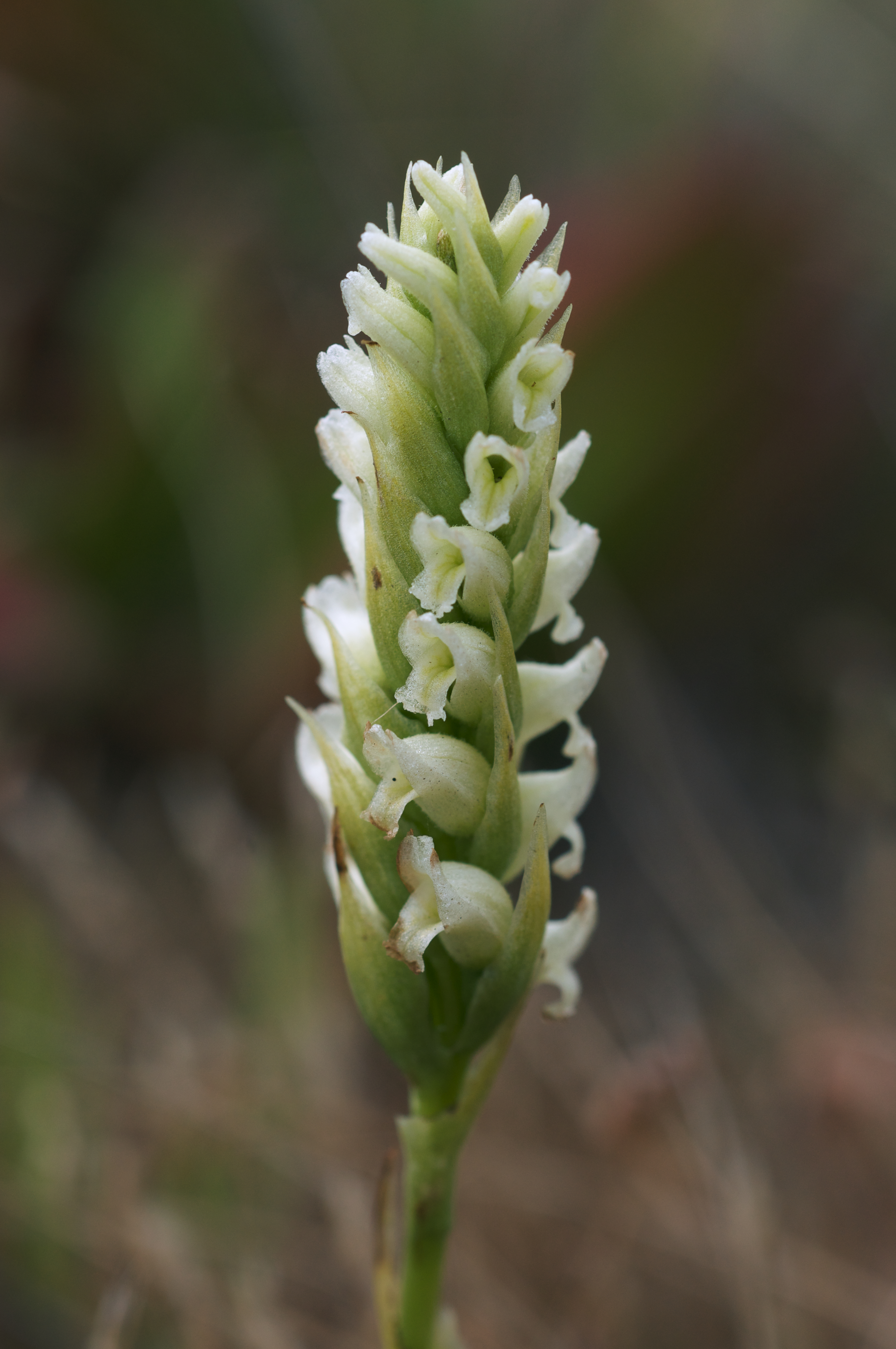

Conservation status
- Least Concern (IUCN 3.1)

- Secure (NatureServe)

Scientific classification
- Kingdom: Plantae
- Clade: Tracheophytes
- Clade: Angiosperms
- Clade: Monocots
- Order: Asparagales
- Family: Orchidaceae
- Subfamily: Orchidoideae
- Tribe: Cranichideae
- Genus: Spiranthes
- Species: S. romanzoffiana

Binomial name
- Spiranthes romanzoffiana Cham.

Synonyms
- List: Gyrostachys romanzoffiana; Ibidium romanzoffianum; Orchiastrum romanzoffianum; Triorchis romanzoffianus

= Spiranthes romanzoffiana =

Species of flowering plant

Spiranthes romanzoffiana, commonly known as hooded lady's tresses (alternatively hooded ladies' tresses) or Irish lady's-tresses (Irish: Cùilìn Gaelach), is a species of orchid. Collected by Chamisso during the Romanzov expedition it was described by him in 1828 and named for Count Nikolay Rumyantsev who financed the expedition. This orchid is native to North America, Ireland and Great Britain.

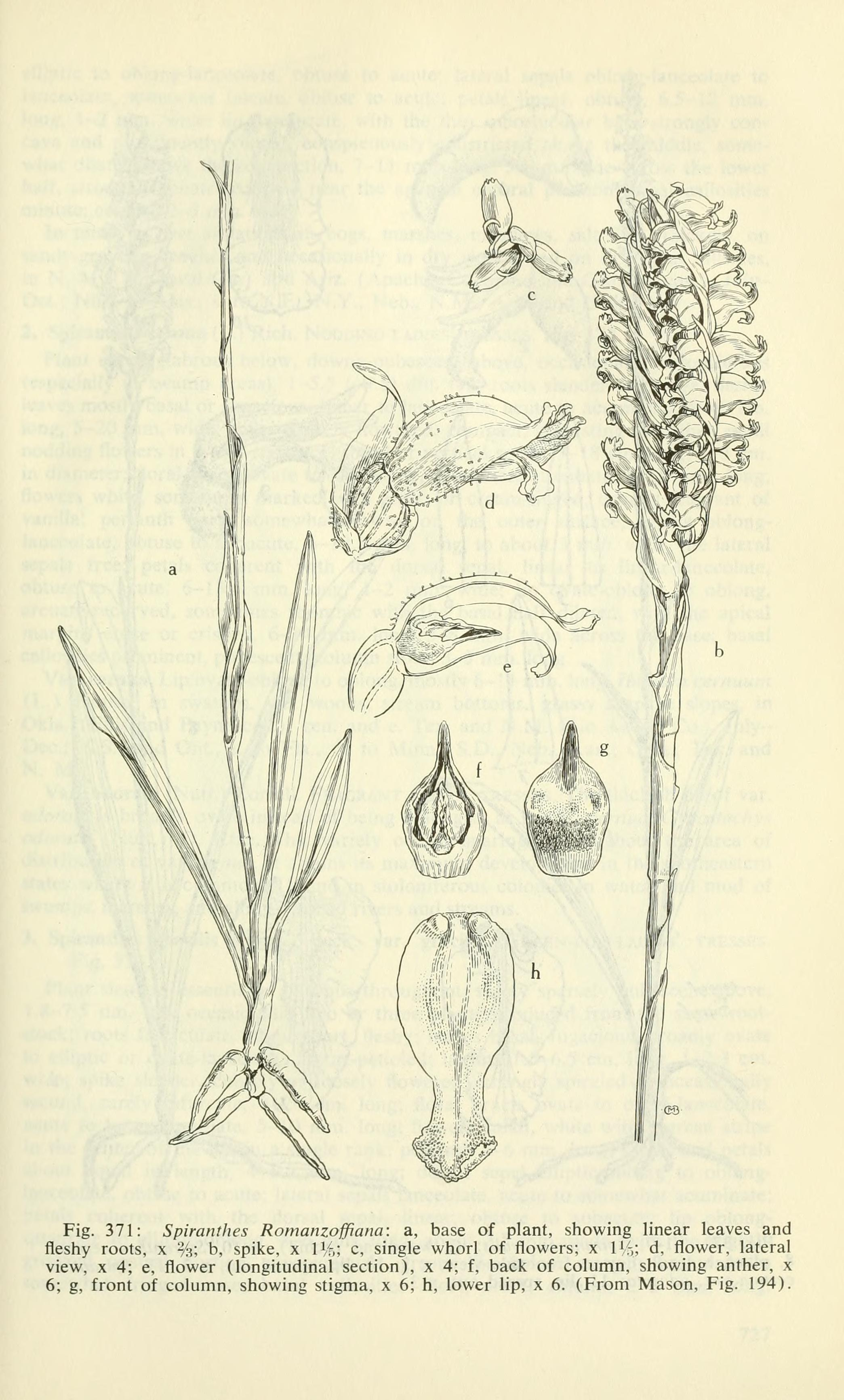
Spiranthes romanzoffiana. a, base of plant, showing linear leaves and fleshy roots, x %; b, spike, x 1%; c, single whorl of flowers; x I'f; d, flower, lateral view, X 4; e, flower (longitudinal section), x 4; f, back of column, showing anther, x 6; g, front of column, showing stigma, x 6; h, lower lip, x 6. Original plate

== Description ==
Hooded lady's tresses is a perennial plant with a fleshy rootstock. It sends up shoots with lanceolate leaves and three rows of flowers arranged in spirally twisted rows. Each scented flower has the sepals and petals united forming a lip of a tube. The labellum (or lower petal) of the flower is white with green veins.

The plant flowers in late summer. The flowers are pollinated by insects, and the tiny dust-like seed is distributed by the wind. However the plant can also reproduce vegetatively by means of root tubers which can grow new shoots while the old parts of the plant die. The orchid is associated with a mycorrhizal fungus which can provide it with essential nutrients.

== Taxonomy ==
Spiranthes romanzoffiana was scientifically described and named in 1828 by Adelbert von Chamisso. It is classified in the genus Spiranthes within the family Orchidaceae. It has fifteen synonyms including twelve species and three varieties.

Table of Synonyms
| Name | Year | Rank | Notes |
|---|---|---|---|
| Gyrostachys gemmipara (Sm.) Kuntze | 1891 | species | = het. |
| Gyrostachys romanzoffiana (Cham.) MacMill. | 1892 | species | ≡ hom. |
| Gyrostachys stricta Rydb. | 1900 | species | = het. |
| Ibidium romanzoffianum (Cham.) House | 1906 | species | ≡ hom. |
| Ibidium romanzoffianum var. strictum (Rydb.) Daniels | 1911 | variety | = het. |
| Ibidium strictum (Rydb.) House | 1905 | species | = het. |
| Neottia gemmipara Sm. | 1828 | species | = het. |
| Orchiastrum romanzoffianum (Cham.) Greene | 1894 | species | ≡ hom. |
| Spiranthes gemmipara (Sm.) Lindl. | 1829 | species | = het. |
| Spiranthes pauciflora Raf. | 1833 | species | = het. |
| Spiranthes romanzoffiana var. gemmipara (Sm.) Kreutz & M.H.Schot | 2016 | variety | = het. |
| Spiranthes romanzoffiana var. stricta (Rydb.) Druce | 1928 | variety | = het. |
| Spiranthes stricta (Rydb.) A.Nelson | 1909 | species | = het. |
| Triorchis romanzoffianus (Cham.) Nieuwl. | 1913 | species | ≡ hom. |
| Triorchis strictus (Rydb.) Nieuwl. | 1913 | species | = het. |
Notes: ≡ homotypic synonym; = heterotypic synonym

== Distribution and habitat ==
Hooded ladies' tresses was first described by the German botanist Adelbert von Chamisso. He named it in honour of his patron Nikolay Rumyantsev who had financed the scientific exploration to the Americas in 1815–1818 on which he found the orchid. It is common in North America, including Canada and the United States, but also grows in a few locations in Scotland and Ireland. It is now considered regionally extinct in England, but has recently (2019) been found in Wales.

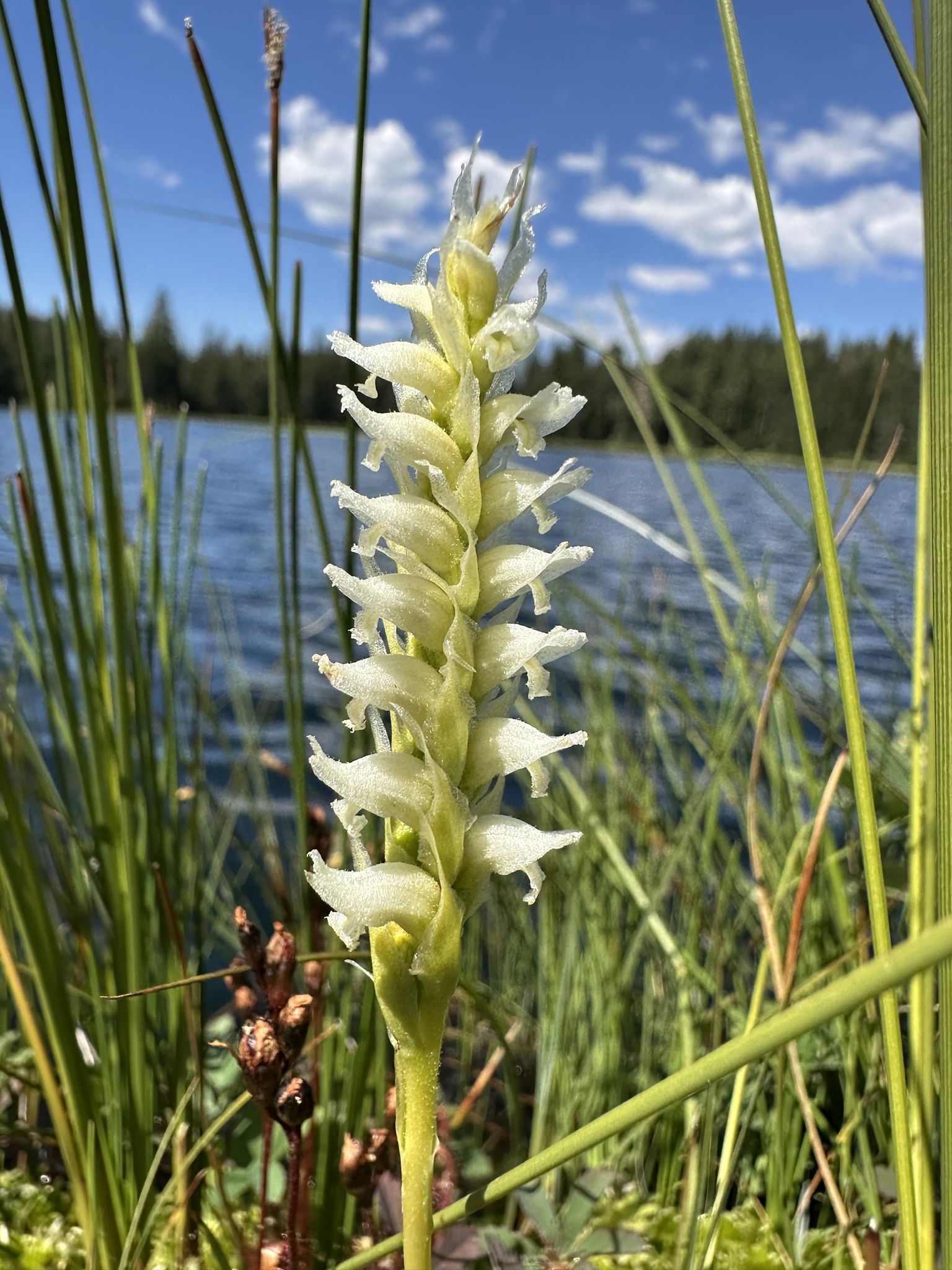
In Oregon

The first Irish record was made in 1810 in County Cork. Since then it has been found in a number of other locations in Ireland and Northern Ireland, including the Lough Neagh basin and the Mourne Mountains and the hills of Antrim. It grows along lakeshores and in damp pastures. The distribution pattern, occurring on both sides of the Atlantic Ocean, is puzzling.

== Ecology ==
Interactions between Irish Lady's Tresses and Its pollinating partners have only been studied in the West Irish populations. The most common pollinators are the Bombus pascuorum, B. hortorum and Apis mellifera. Studies on Mycorrhizal associations for Irish Lady's Tresses have not been conducted. Recent studies have found genetic hybrids in the Ontario, Canada population. Genetic studies have also been conducted in order to ascertain the genetic diversity of the European Population.

== Further references ==
- Smith, J. E. August 1834. English Botany, Supplement 2786. Copied to New Edition (1840), Volume 7, Page 13, Plate 1212**. "Neottia gemmipara, Proliferous Lady's Tresses"
- Horsman, F. 2013. The discovery and subsequent history of Spiranthes romanzoffiana Chamisso (Orchidaceae) at Castletown Bearhaven in West Cork (H3) Irish Naturalists' Journal 32 19 - 25.
