= Benjamin Franklin Greene =

- Born: November 18, 1817; Providence, Rhode Island, United States
- Died: October 17, 1895 (aged 77)
- Occupations: Engineer; educator
- Employer: Rensselaer Polytechnic Institute
- Known for: Director of the Rensselaer Polytechnic Institute

Benjamin Franklin Greene (1817–1895) was the third senior professor and first director of Rensselaer Polytechnic Institute.

== Early life ==
He was born in Lebanon, New Hampshire on October 25, 1817. He graduated from Rensselaer in 1842. He taught mathematics at Washington College in Chestertown, Maryland from 1843 to 1846.

== Career ==
In 1846, he was appointed senior professor at Rensselaer, replacing George Hammell Cook, who served as senior professor since the death of Amos Eaton in 1842. He conducted an extensive study of the technical schools of Europe, such as the École Polytechnique of Paris and the Polytechnisches Institut in Vienna. He wrote an extensive report describing the European schools and the changes he felt were appropriate. He envisioned changing the school from a one-year graduate program to a comprehensive undergraduate program. The plan also including relocation of the school from downtown to a thirty-acre site on a hill. However, the plan was not entirely successful. It was estimated later that his plans would have required between one and two million dollars, which was an enormous amount at the time. For instance, it proposed a school of architecture at a time when there was no such school anywhere in the U.S. However, the school of architecture was not established until 1929. When its new home was completed in 1931, it was named the Greene Building in his honor.

In 1850, he formally became director of Rensselaer. (He used the title as early as 1847 but it was not formal until the state legislature created the title in 1850.) In 1851, he changed the name of the school from Rensselaer Institute to Rensselaer Polytechnic Institute. The name was officially changed by state legislation in 1861.

Greene resigned from Rensselaer in 1859 after disagreements with the board of trustees. He then started a competing engineering school, but it failed after three years. He was chief clerk of the U.S. Navy Bureau of Navigation from 1863 to 1873 and then a professor of mathematics in the U.S. Navy.

== Personal life ==
He married in 1848 but his wife died two years later.

He died in West Lebanon, New Hampshire on November 22, 1895.
