= List of RPI buildings =

This is a list of notable buildings of the Rensselaer Polytechnic Institute (RPI).

== Academy Hall ==
=== History ===
Academy Hall used to be the location of Troy Public School 14, which was built in 1923. RPI first tried to buy the building from the Troy City School District in 1986, but they turned down the offer from the school district. In 1990 a second, more favorable offer for RPI was given, and this time RPI accepted the deal. The building was renamed Academy Hall in 1998.

=== Present day ===
Academy Hall houses the dean of students, office of the First Year Experience, and the F.E. Gallagher Memorial Student Health Center.

== Amos Eaton Hall ==
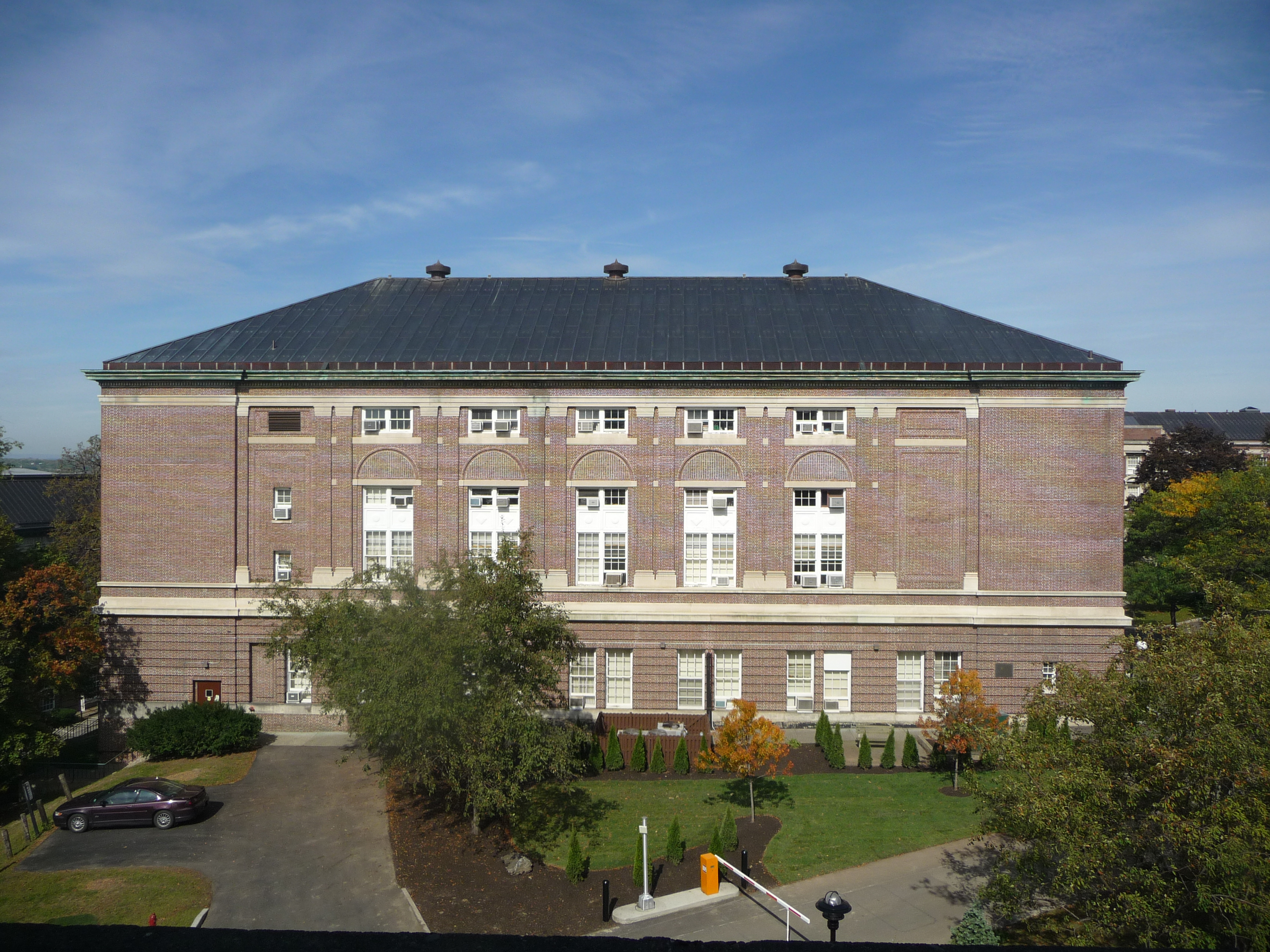
Amos Eaton Hall

Amos Eaton Hall was built in 1928. It is the current home of RPI's mathematics department.

== Armory/Alumni Sports and Recreation Center ==
=== History ===
The Alumni Sports and Recreation Center, also known as the Armory, was originally built as the Troy Armory in 1920, and served as a headquarters for the New York Guard and National Guard for many years. In 1944, Rensselaer made their first attempt to purchase the armory, to meet the demand for training space for the Naval Reserve Officers Training Corps, or Naval ROTC, although this deal ultimately fell through with RPI, and they instead rented space until 1951. A second attempt to acquire the armory was made in 1955, as it became a key part of RPI's expansion plans, and hinged on the federal appropriations for new armories and a provision for building a new armory. However, without federal appropriation coming, the purchase of the armory was tabled in 1957. In 1970 RPI was able to finalize an agreement with New York State to purchase the armory, and later with alumni funding was able to convert it into a sports and recreation facility.

=== Present day ===
The Armory has a gymnasium with a synthetic rubber floor and a pool, along with multiple centers for the various ROTC programs.

== Carnegie Building ==
The Carnegie Building is a four-story building named after Andrew Carnegie and completed in 1906. It currently houses RPI's Cognitive Science Department.

== Darrin Communications Center ==
The Darrin Communications Center, or DCC, is one of the primary lecture buildings at RPI, with a total of four major lecture halls, a semi-circular case study classroom with several televisions, and a broadcast studio for WRPI, the campus radio broadcasting club. It is also host to a small café, and a variety of other classrooms and offices in the basement, and is directly connected to the Low Center for Industrial Innovation.

=== History ===
Originally planned to be built southwest of the Science Center, at the location of the Cogswell Laboratory, the location was moved in March 1966 to be on the east end of '86 field and postponed in 1968 due to a lack of federal funding for the building. After securing funding, the project was resumed in 1970 with construction of the DCC expecting to conclude in fall 1972, but was delayed to fall 1973 due to a combination field conditions and design issues. The Darrin Communication Centered was officially named that in 1987 "in recognition of a lifetime of dedication, loyalty and support to Rensselaer" by trustee David M. Darrin.

== Experimental Media and Performing Arts Center ==
The Experimental Media and Performing Arts Center is known as EMPAC.

== Greene Building ==
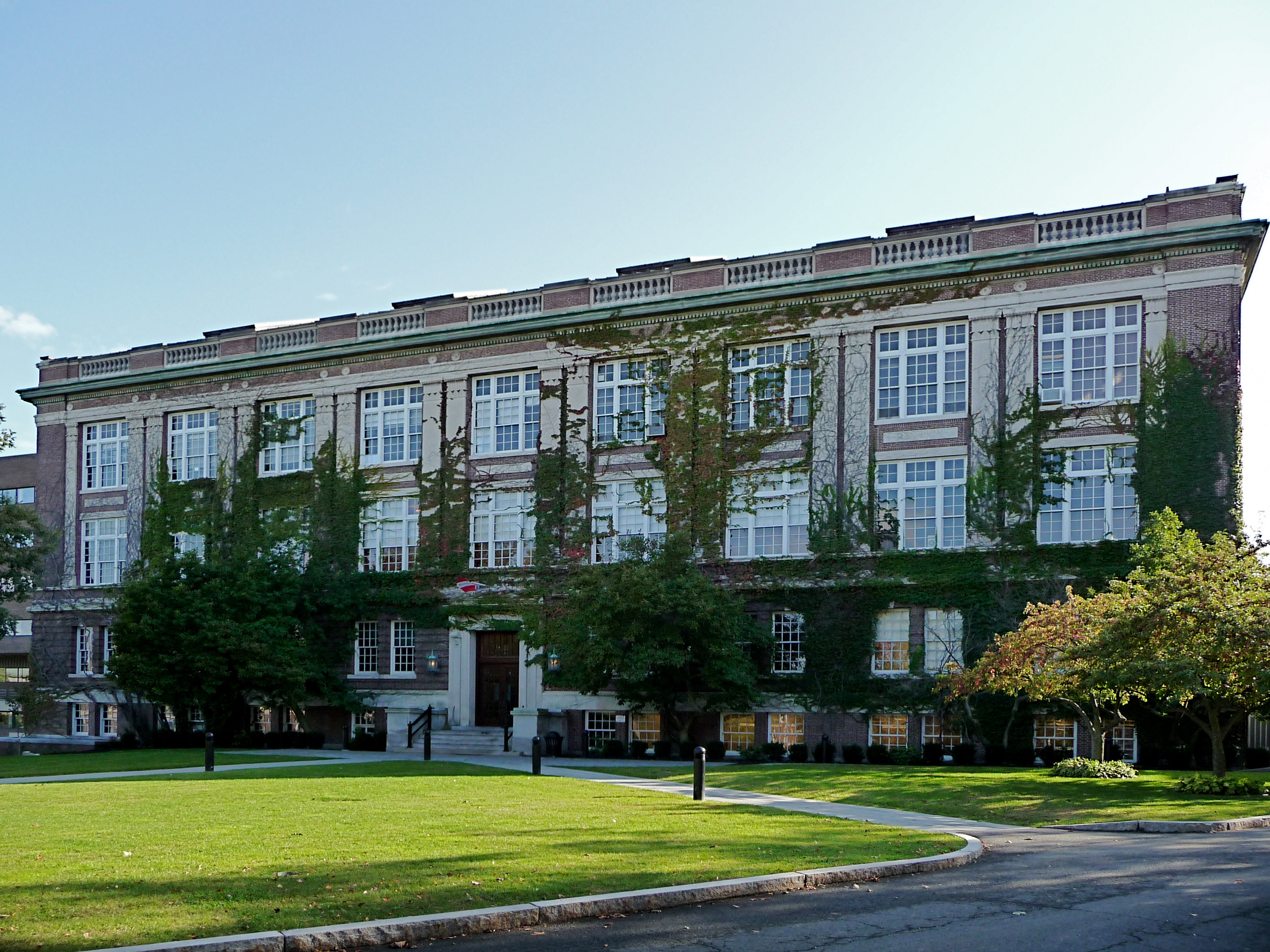
The Greene Building, north side

The Greene Building is home of the Rensselaer School of Architecture at Rensselaer Polytechnic Institute.

Named for Benjamin Franklin Greene, it has its own library for use by architecture students. The second floor contains a gallery for students' work. The basement and the third and fourth floors contain multiple studios, which are open 24 hours a day for students and faculty to complete projects. The architecture library contains 30,000 books and over 100,000 slides.

The majority of the first basement level houses the wood shop. This state-of-the-art shop includes a milling machine, two laser cutters, many wood working machines, and space for students to construct models. The remainder of the first basement level contains a few more class spaces, while the second basement level and mezzanine contain offices.

=== History ===
The building was completed in 1931 at a cost of $400,000, shortly after the School of Architecture was founded. The building was named in memory of Benjamin Franklin Greene, director of Rensselaer from 1847 to 1859, who first proposed a school of architecture at the institute. The names of 15 of the most renowned deceased American architects were cut in stone above the second-story windows: Bulfinch, Burnham, Goodhue, Hooker, Hunt, Jefferson, Latrobe, McComb, McIntyre, McKim, Mills, Renwick, Richardson, Sullivan, and Upjohn.

== Pittsburgh Building ==
The Pittsburgh Building was erected in February 1912 as the institute's new administrative building. It was funded by a donation of $125,000 from the Alumni Association of Pittsburgh, which is what the building is named for. The building was designed by W. G. Wilkins, a Pittsburgh alumnus, who donated his services to this project.

In 1998, Thelma P. and Kenneth T. Lally donated $15 million to the institute. This made renovating the Pittsburgh building into a technology-intensive center for teaching and research possible. The $7.5 million renovation transformed the building into the Lally School of Management and Technology, and was completed by Lee Harris Pomeroy (Class of 1954) Associates.

== Rensselaer Student Union ==
In March 1958, a referendum was presented to the student body to increase the student activity fee by $5 to fund a student union. The referendum, which was voted on during the Grand Marshal election in April and passed with 79% of students supporting the measure, was a huge success and raised over $250,000.

Ernest J. Kump Associates was chosen to design the $3 million building. Construction began in early 1965, and it opened to students in May 1967. The union, placed on the 15th Street campus corridor, was designed to be a true center of student activity, with recreation areas, a snack bar, bookstore, meeting rooms, and offices for student organizations and student services. It remains a hub of student activity today, and is a popular destination for a range of activities. The union's main dining hall was named the McNeil Room in honor of Frank McNeil, director of the Union from 1929 to 1968.

In 1985, the union's basement was expanded, giving more room to the bookstore, and storage space was added on the south side.

== Ricketts Building ==
In 1933, Palmer Ricketts initiated the construction of a building for the newly established aeronautical and metallurgical engineering courses. The building, tentatively named Van Rensselaer Hall, was built of Harvard brick and Indiana limestone, with steel and concrete floors and heavy tile interior walls. It is 184 feet long and 59 feet wide, with four stories and a basement housing three laboratories.

The laboratory building, opened in 1935, was officially named the Ricketts Building in memory of Palmer C. Ricketts, who died on December 10, 1934, and had been the Institute's first president since 1901, when his role of director expanded to encompass more duties, subsequently creating the role.

The building became the center for the newly established Chemical Engineering department, which up until that point had been teaching out of the Walker Laboratory, since 1922 when the department was officially formed. Today, many core chemical engineering lectures and laboratories are still held there, and the first floor contains a student lounge named for Lewis Selrick Coonley, one of the original three chemical engineering faculty members the Institute had in the early 1930s.

== Russell Sage Laboratory ==
Russell Risley Sage (August 4, 1816 – July 22, 1906) was a trustee of Rensselaer Polytechnic Institute for 10 years and is Russell Sage Laboratory's namesake. After his death in 1907, his wife, Olivia Slocum Sage, donated $1,000,000 to Rensselaer Polytechnic Institute as a memorial to her late husband. The Russell Sage Laboratory, built and equipped at a cost of $405,000, was designed by Lawlor & Haase and constructed of Harvard brick with limestone trimmings. The building was finished in 1909. An addition was added in 1923 at a cost of $235,000. Russell Sage Laboratory was completely renovated in 1985 and currently houses the School of Humanities and Social Sciences.

There were three principal sections of the building: the west wing devoted to Mechanical Engineering, the east wing for the Electrical department and the central section used by both departments. The central portion contained a lecture room seating 400 persons, a large drawing room and a laboratory for a 600,000 pound machine for testing materials of construction.

== Troy Building ==
The Troy Building was built with funds raised by the citizens of Troy to commemorate the centennial of the Institute in 1924. The brick and limestone building was designed by Frederick Marcus Cummings, Class of 1886, and was completed in 1925. It initially housed the civil engineering department, and later became home to the offices of the dean of students, president, provost, and members of the cabinet. The second floor includes three interactive classrooms, one of which is a classroom in the round known as the Collaborative Classroom.

== Voorhees Computing Center ==
=== History ===
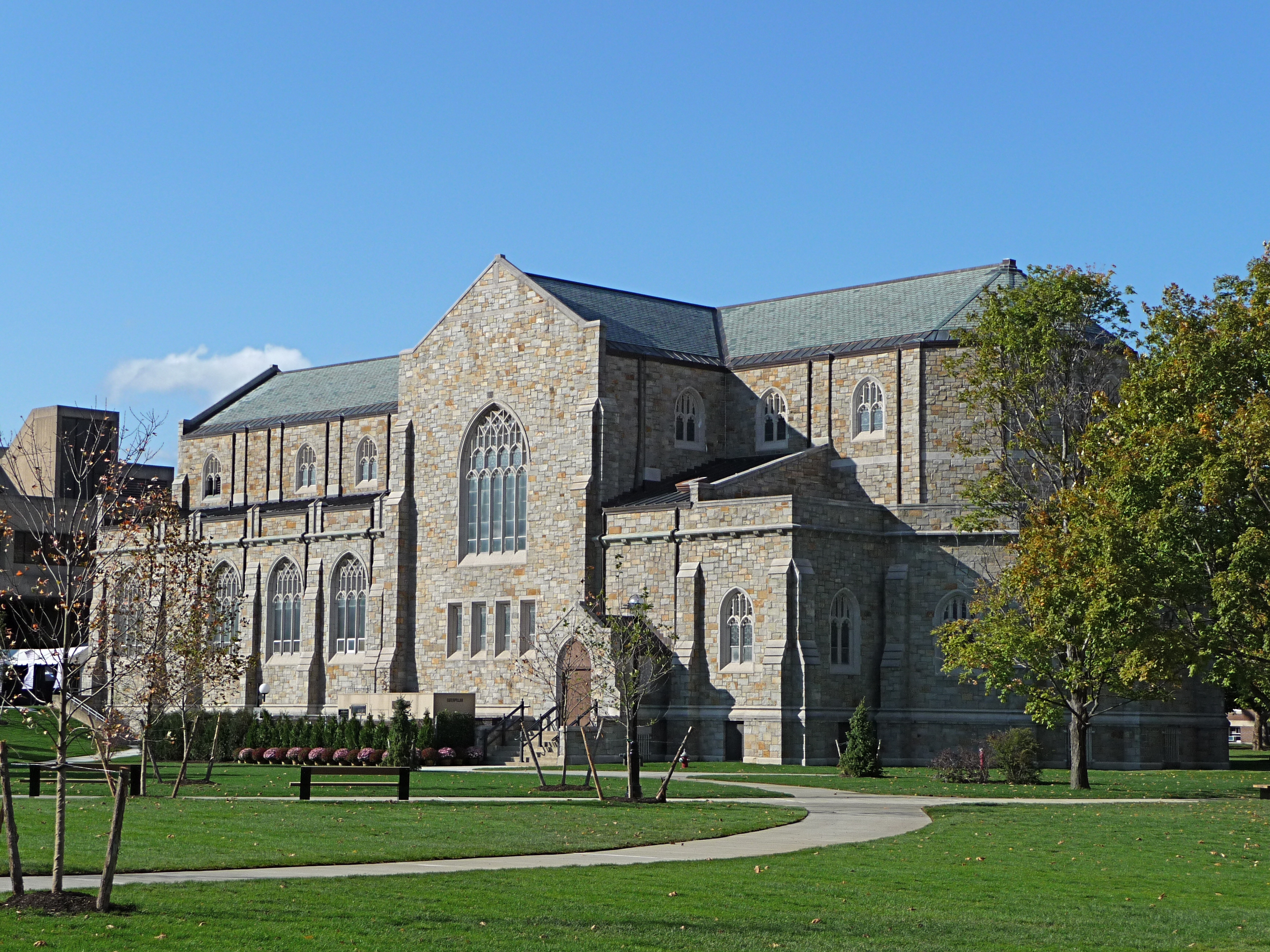
Voorhees Computing Center

The chapel was originally constructed as a part of the St. Joseph's Seminary in 1933, adjoining the main seminary building, which was demolished in 1970 to make way for the Folsom Library. The building was acquired by Rensselaer Polytechnic Institute in 1958 and renovated to serve as the campus library in 1960. It did so until the completion of the Folsom Library across the way in 1976, at which point the building was left unused. In 1977, RPI administration decided to replace the old computing center at Amos Eaton, and settled on renovating the old chapel.

In 1979, the Alan M. Voorhees Computing Center was dedicated in honor of Alan Voorhees, who had donated $3.4 million, the largest single contribution made to RPI by an individual at the time. During the dedication ceremony, then-president of RPI George Low described the Voorhees Computing Center as "the most unique computing center in the world." The center initially housed an IBM 3033 computing system, which allowed for RPI to become one of the most technologically advanced institutions at the time, and provided access for both students and faculty to work on assignments and research projects from different terminals both in the building and around the campus.

When the chapel was originally renovated, to save on costs, the heat generated from the IBM computer was originally used to heat the building in the winter. With the advent of computers that generated less heat, the chapel had a more conventional heating system installed. In October 2023, installation of an IBM Quantum System One began at RPI, the first IBM Quantum Computer to be installed on a college campus in the United States. Installation was completed on April 4, 2024, and it was available to researchers, partner organizations, and students, for research in fields such as chemistry, physics, and materials science.

=== Present day ===
Today, the Voorhees Computing Center has a multitude of computers that are used by students to work on projects and multiple printers. The building is also host to the campus help center, which provides students with help on technical problems or other related issues.

== Walker Laboratory ==
The Walker Laboratory serves as Rensselaer Polytechnic Institute's predominant chemistry lab. The building was erected in 1907 and made possible by a $200,000 donation from Mrs. R. J. Walker in memory of her son, Dr. William Weightman Walker, Class of 1886. After its completion, an addition was constructed in 1919, and the building was renovated in 1996 to modernize it.
