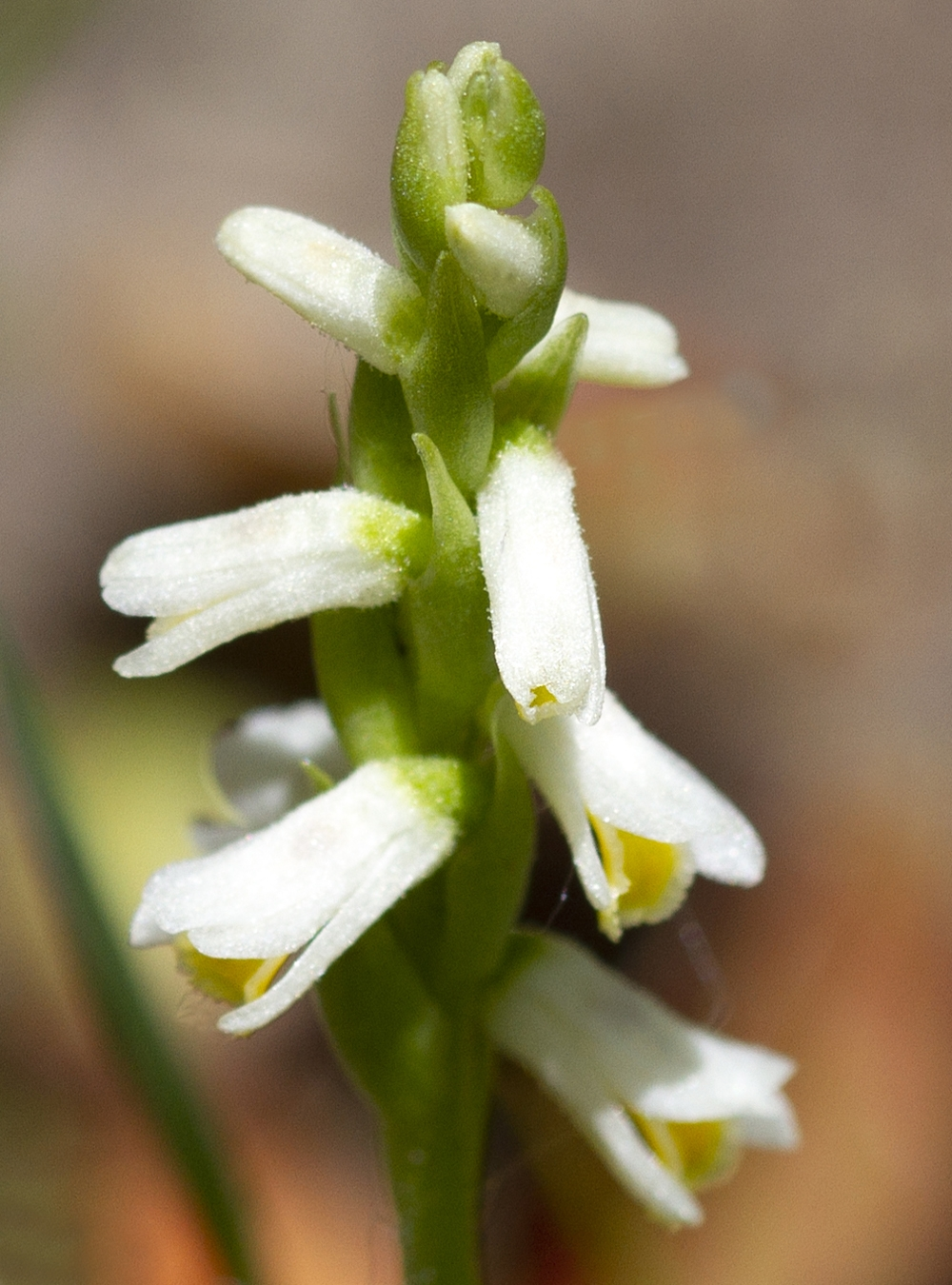

Conservation status
- Apparently Secure (NatureServe)

Scientific classification
- Kingdom: Plantae
- Clade: Tracheophytes
- Clade: Angiosperms
- Clade: Monocots
- Order: Asparagales
- Family: Orchidaceae
- Subfamily: Orchidoideae
- Tribe: Cranichideae
- Genus: Spiranthes
- Species: S. lucida

Binomial name
- Spiranthes lucida (H. H. Eaton) Ames

Synonyms
- Neottia lucida H. H. Eaton; Ibidium plantagineum (Rafinesque) House; Spiranthes plantaginea Rafinesque

= Spiranthes lucida =

Species of orchid

Spiranthes lucida, the shining ladies'-tresses, is a species of orchid native to northeastern North America.

== Description ==
Spiranthes lucida is a perennial, herbaceous plant up to 37 cm tall. The 3-4 leaves are basal, and persist after flowering time, unlike many other Spiranthes species. This is one of the earliest flowering species of ladies'-tresses, with flowers produced between May and August. The flowers are arranged spirally on a single spike. The flowers are white, with a prominent brilliant yellow lip.

== Distribution and habitat ==
Spiranthes lucida occurs from Nova Scotia to northeastern Wisconsin, south to Virginia, Arkansas, and Missouri. It occurs in saturated, calcareous, sandy or gravelly soils found in habitats such as riverbanks, fens, seeps, and gravel pits.

== Ecology ==
Bees in the family Halictidae have been observed visiting the flowers. The flower morphology is better adapted for short-tongued bees like these than for longer-tongued bees such as bumblebees, unlike most other Spiranthes species.

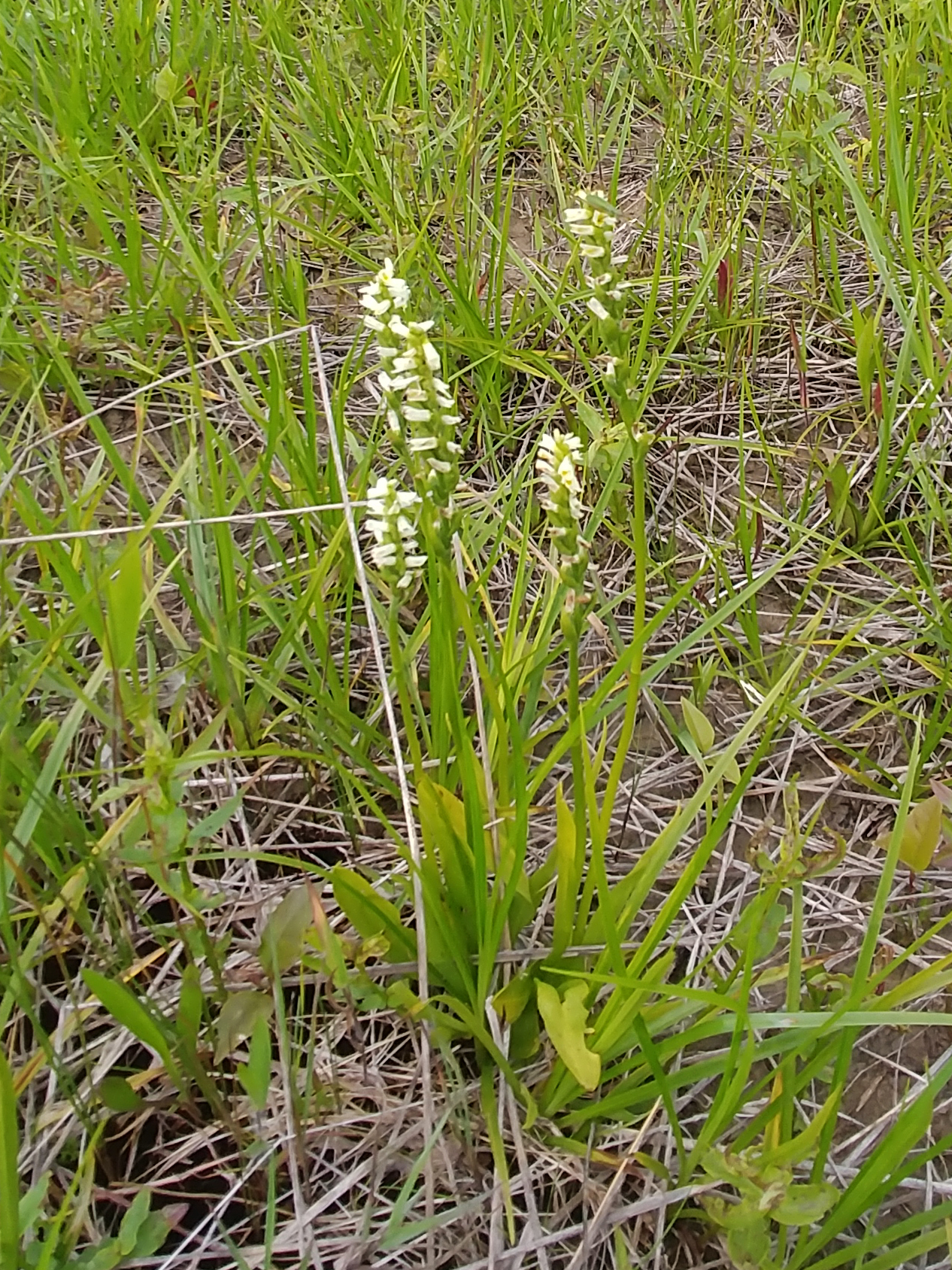
plant form

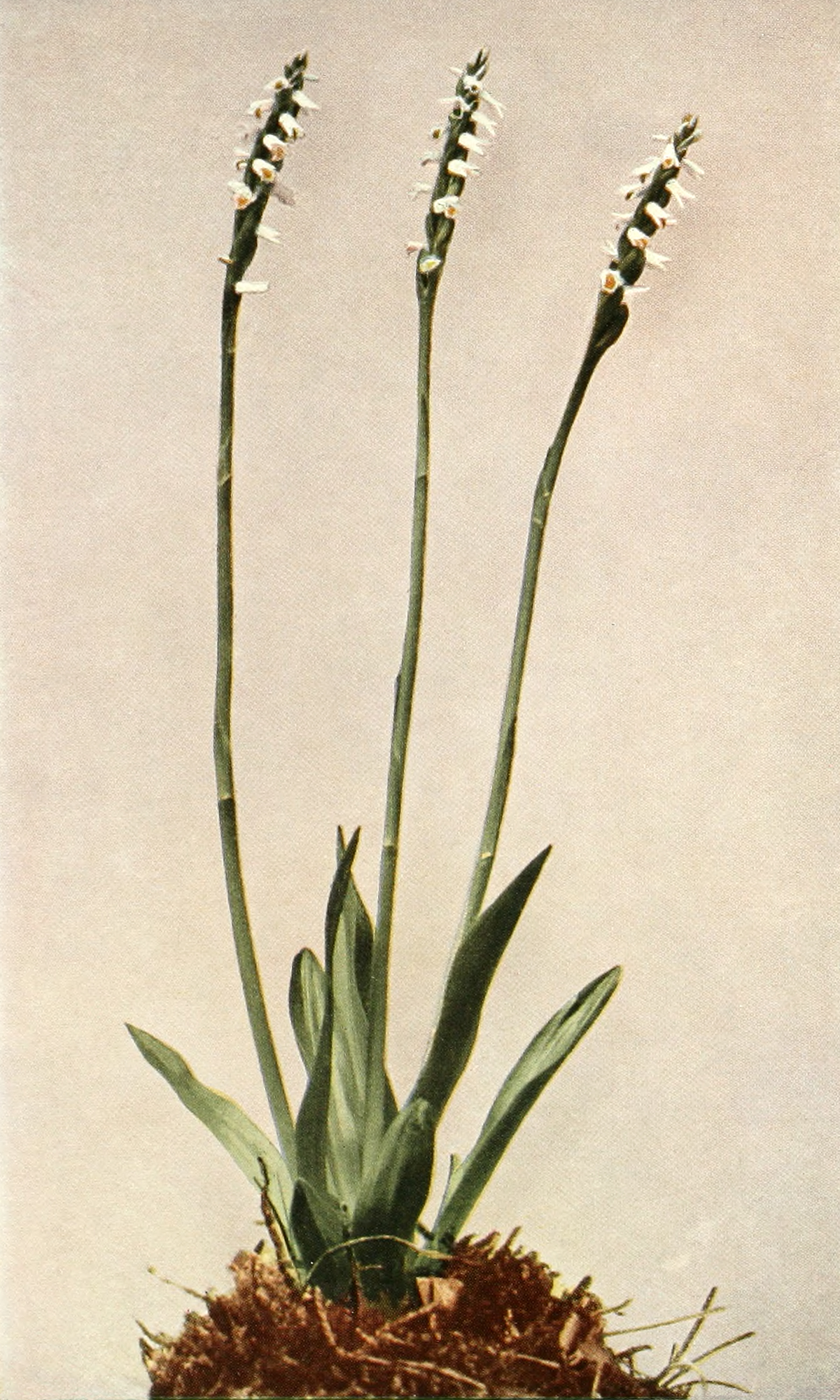
botanical illustration

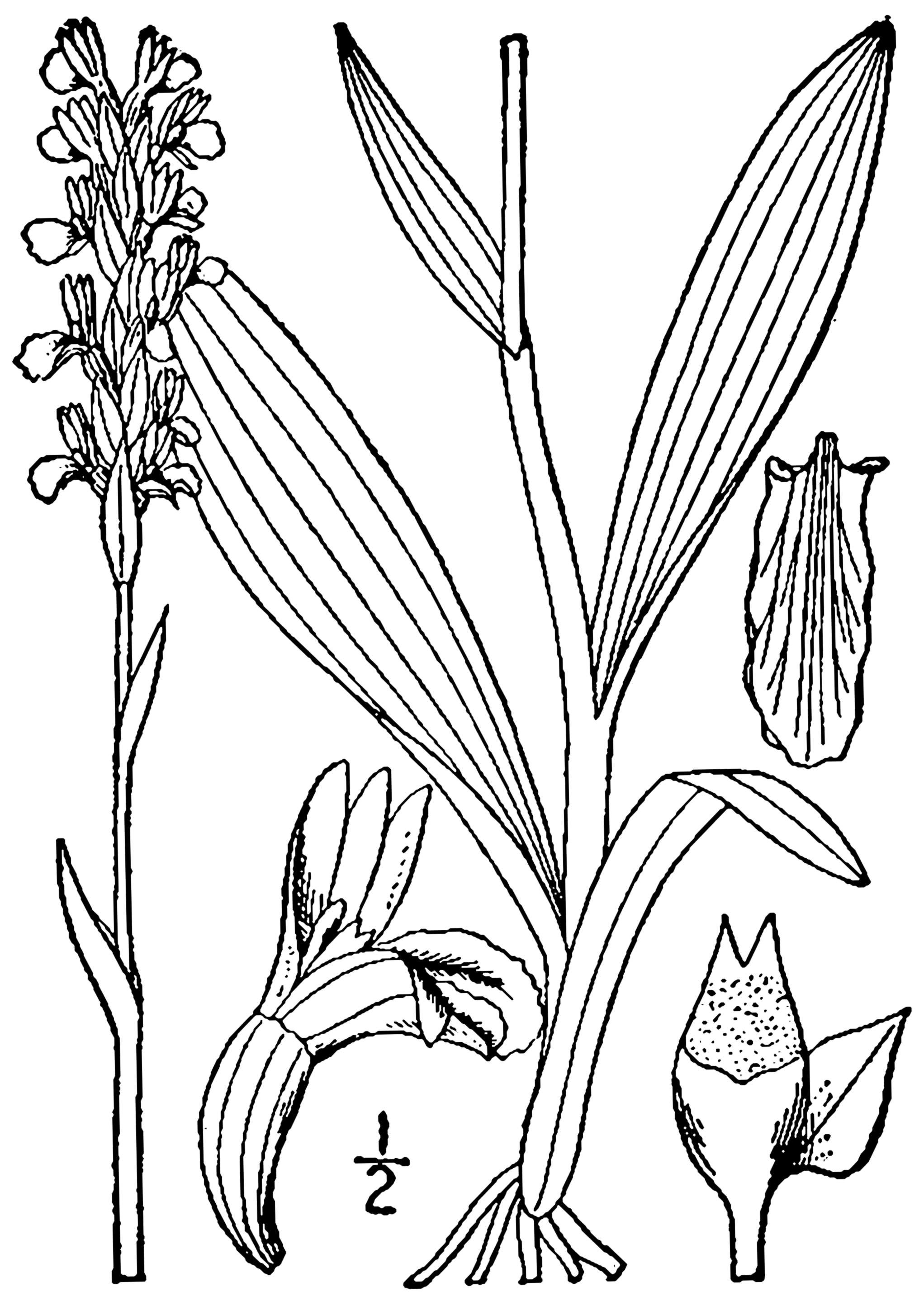
botanical illustration
