= Richard G. Folsom =

American academic administrator (1907–1996)

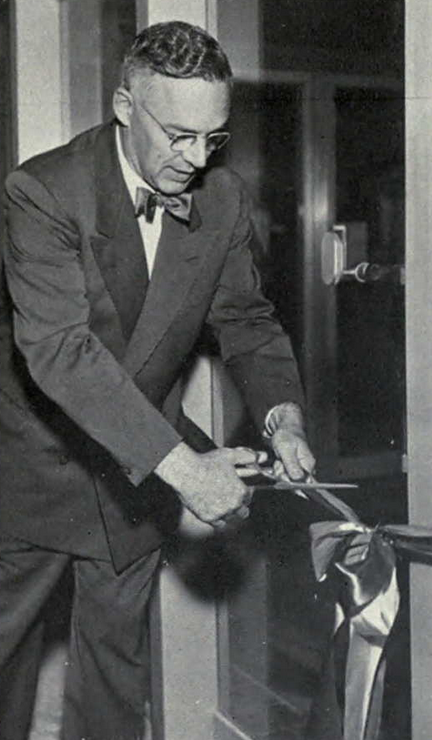
Richard G. Folsom at Michigan

Richard Gilman Folsom (1907 – 1996) was an American mechanical engineer, professor of mechanical engineering at the University of California at Berkeley, and the twelfth president of Rensselaer Polytechnic Institute. He also known as the 91st president of the American Society of Mechanical Engineers in the year 1972–73.

== Biography ==
=== Youth and education ===
Folsom was born on February 3, 1907, in Los Angeles, California, to Harry Gilman Folsom and Mabel Hazard Folsom. In 1929, he married Carroll Grace Greene. He died on March 11, 1996, in Napa, CA.

He received B.S., M.S. and P.h.D. degrees in mechanical engineering from the California Institute of Technology (in 1928, 1929 and 1932, respectively). His Ph.D. thesis was entitled An experimental investigation of the phenomena produced by the highly turbulent flow of water past a series of sharp obstacles.

=== Career in education and administration ===
In 1933, he became an instructor in mechanical engineering at the University of California at Berkeley, rising to full professor. From 1947 to 1953, he was chairman of the mechanical engineering department and from 1952 to 1953 he was also director of the mechanical engineering laboratories. From 1953 to 1958, he was director of the Engineering Research Institute at the University of Michigan.

In 1958, he was appointed president of Rensselaer. In 1960, the institute established a department of nuclear engineering. The institute also began to enroll women during this time. Previously, the institute had awarded degrees to only 69 women, the first being in 1945. In 1971, he retired from the presidency. In 1976, a new library that had been started during his presidency was named in his honor.

Considered one of America's top authorities in the theory and practice of fluid dynamics, he was involved in diverse research projects including food preservation by atomic energy, landing of supersonic aircraft, development of upper-atmosphere research, machining of tough metals, high-temperature metallurgy, acoustics, industrial air pollution and the building of structure to resist bomb blasts. During World War II he was instrumental in developing the landing vehicles used at Normandy and in the Pacific. His studies were published in numerous professional and technical journals, and he presented over 60 paper in the fields of mechanical and chemical engineering and higher education.

During his career, he was advisor, consultant or board member for a variety of corporations and political entities as well as academic, technical, scientific and military institutions and organizations. He was a member of the National Academy of Engineering, the American Society of Mechanical Engineers, the American Institute of Aeronautics and Astronautics, the American Institute of Chemical Engineers, and the American Society for Engineering Education. During his association with ASME, Folsom was an honorary director, president, Wright Lecturer, and Centennial Medallion Award recipient. Among his many awards, Folsom received a Navy Distinguished Service Award for engineering contributions and the Lamme Award from the American Society for Engineering Education.

== Selected publications ==
- Folsom, Richard Gilman. An experimental investigation of the phenomena produced by the highly turbulent flow of water past a series of sharp obstacles. Diss. California Institute of Technology, 1932.

Academic offices
Preceded by Livingston W. Houston	President of Rensselaer Polytechnic Institute; 1958 – 1971	Succeeded by Richard J. Grosh
