= Amos Eaton Hall =

Coordinates: 42.73019°N 73.68246°W

Amos Eaton Hall is the current home of the Department of Mathematical Sciences at Rensselaer Polytechnic Institute in Troy, NY. It is named for Amos Eaton, the co-founder and first senior professor of Rensselaer. Amos Eaton Hall is the only building on the campus referred to by both first and last name. The building opened in 1928.

== History ==
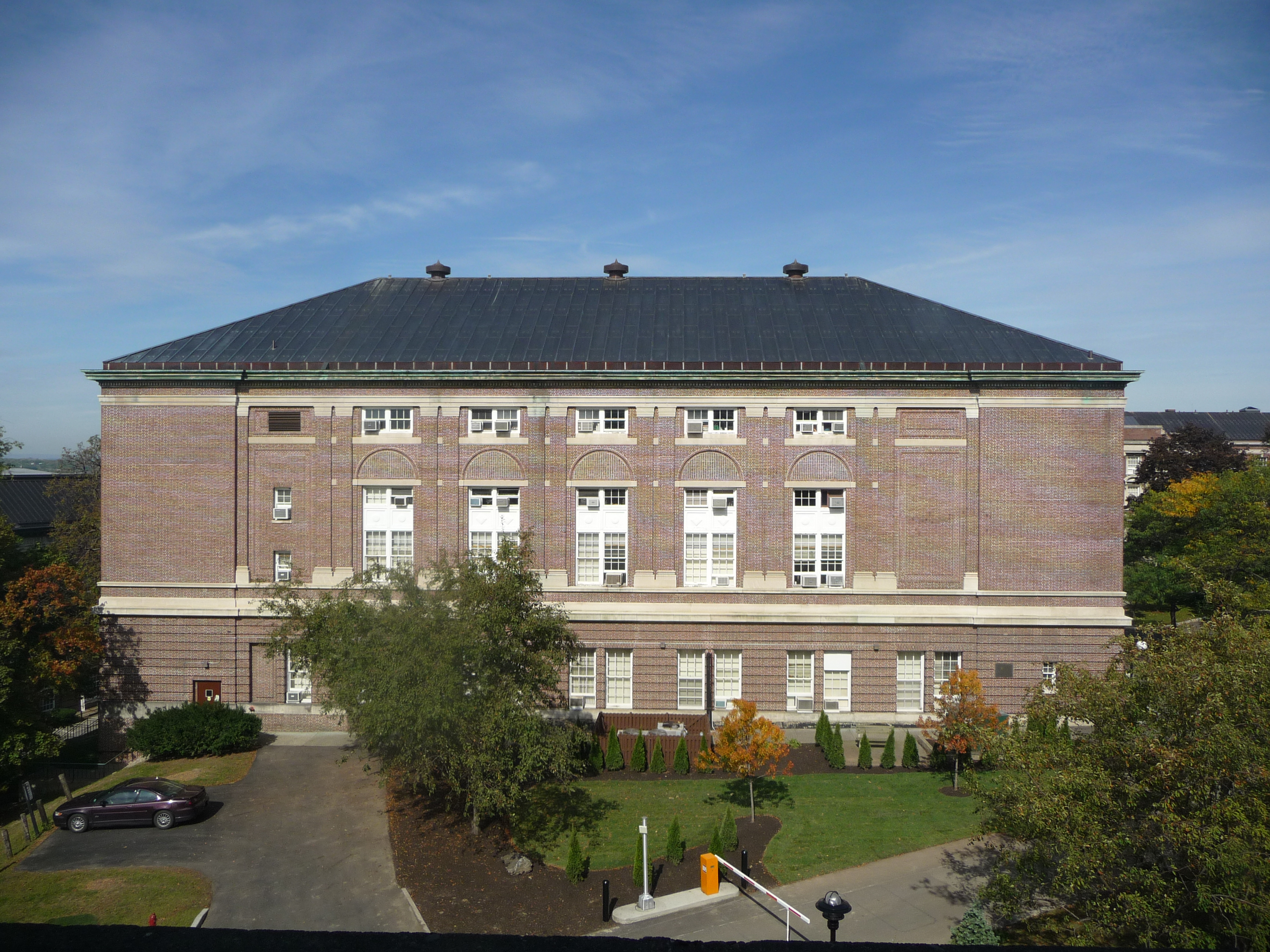
Amos Eaton Hall

In 1926, the Board of Trustees recognized the need for a larger library and assembly hall. The proposed building to house these facilities was to be named in memory of Amos Eaton, the co-founder and first senior professor at Rensselaer. The existing library had outgrown its home in the Pittsburgh Building. The new library was designed to accommodate 160,000 volumes and 240 readers. The new assembly hall was designed to accommodate 1400 people, approximately the size of the student body at the time. In December, 1934, the funeral for Dr. Palmer Chamberlain Ricketts was held at Amos Eaton Hall. Dr. Ricketts was the head of Rensselaer Polytechnic Institute for 42 years and during the service, all nearby merchants ceased business. From 1928 to 1945, Amos Eaton Hall was used as both an auditorium and a laboratory. After this it was adapted by the Physics department until they switched locations in 1961 to a newer Science building. From there, it was turned into a very large study hall.

Amos Eaton Hall, in Colonial Revival style, was designed by Lawler & Haase of New York who had previously designed the '87 Gymnasium in 1911. The actual costs of the building are unknown, as it was contracted together with the Caldwell dormitory in the Quadrangle, but it has been estimated at $300,000.

In 1960, the library was moved to the former St. Joseph's Chapel, where it remained until the Folsom Library was built. In 1963, Amos Eaton hall was to be remodeled to house RPI’s department of mathematics. Dr. Richard G. Folsom speculated that the first phase in renovating it was initially expected to cost approximately $400,000. The National Science Foundation was to grant $142,000 of the total amount. The original cost of the building was $320,000. The initial plan for this renovation included making the above ground basement area to become a machine room and offices for graduate assistants. The first floor was for computing laboratory. The second floor was for the faculty offices as well as graduate assistants. It would also contain a conference lounge and research library. These renovations were in demand for the expanding enrollment for undergraduate and graduate students specifically in mathematics. The second phase of this renovation was to provide more offices, seminar rooms, as well as additional classrooms to the third and fourth floors. Harrison and Mero designed this remodeling that was to take place. In 1963, it was generally recognized as the “first to use the laboratory method in a regular course in science,” according to New Yorks Times Record. After renovation, the hall was opened on April 22, 1965 at 10 am.

In 1964, New York record times stated that the renovations were said to “highlight a decade of expansion by the Rensselaer department of mathematics.” The chapel then became the Voorhees Computing Center. The auditorium space was converted into lab, classroom, and office space. The building was renovated by Harrison and Mero and reopened on April 22, 1965. This $500,000 renovation doubled the usable interior space and increased the number of stories in the building from two to four. The university also equipped the hall with a big computer. It currently houses the Department of Mathematical Sciences and includes some offices of the Department of Computer Science.
