= Hezekiah Hulbert Eaton =

American educator and naturalist

Hezekiah Hulbert Eaton (July 23, 1809, in Catskill, New York – August 16, 1832, in Lexington, Kentucky) was an American educator and naturalist.

== Life ==
Eaton was the fifth son of the botanist and educator Amos Eaton (1776-1842), the fourth of Amos Eaton's second wife Sally Cady (d. 1816). In 1818 the family moved to Albany where he soon began to help collect rocks and plant specimens for his father's lectures. In 1823 he assisted his father in giving courses at Amherst College and Middlebury College and accompanied him on an extensive geological tour of New York and Massachusetts. That winter he once again assisted his father's lectures, this time at the Medical College of Vermont.

In 1824 his father helped found the Rensselaer School and Eaton was one of the first students, graduating in 1826 with the first graduating class.

Eaton lectured at various schools and venues until 1829, when he returned to the Rensselaer School as a Junior Professor. In autumn of 1829 he was invited to join Rev. Benjamin Peers in establishing a new school, later called the Eclectic Institute, in Lexington, Kentucky. In 1831 he was also selected to assist Lunsford Yandell in teaching chemistry at the Transylvania University medical school. He remained in those positions until his death from "pulmonary consumption" on August 16, 1832.

== Contributions to botany ==
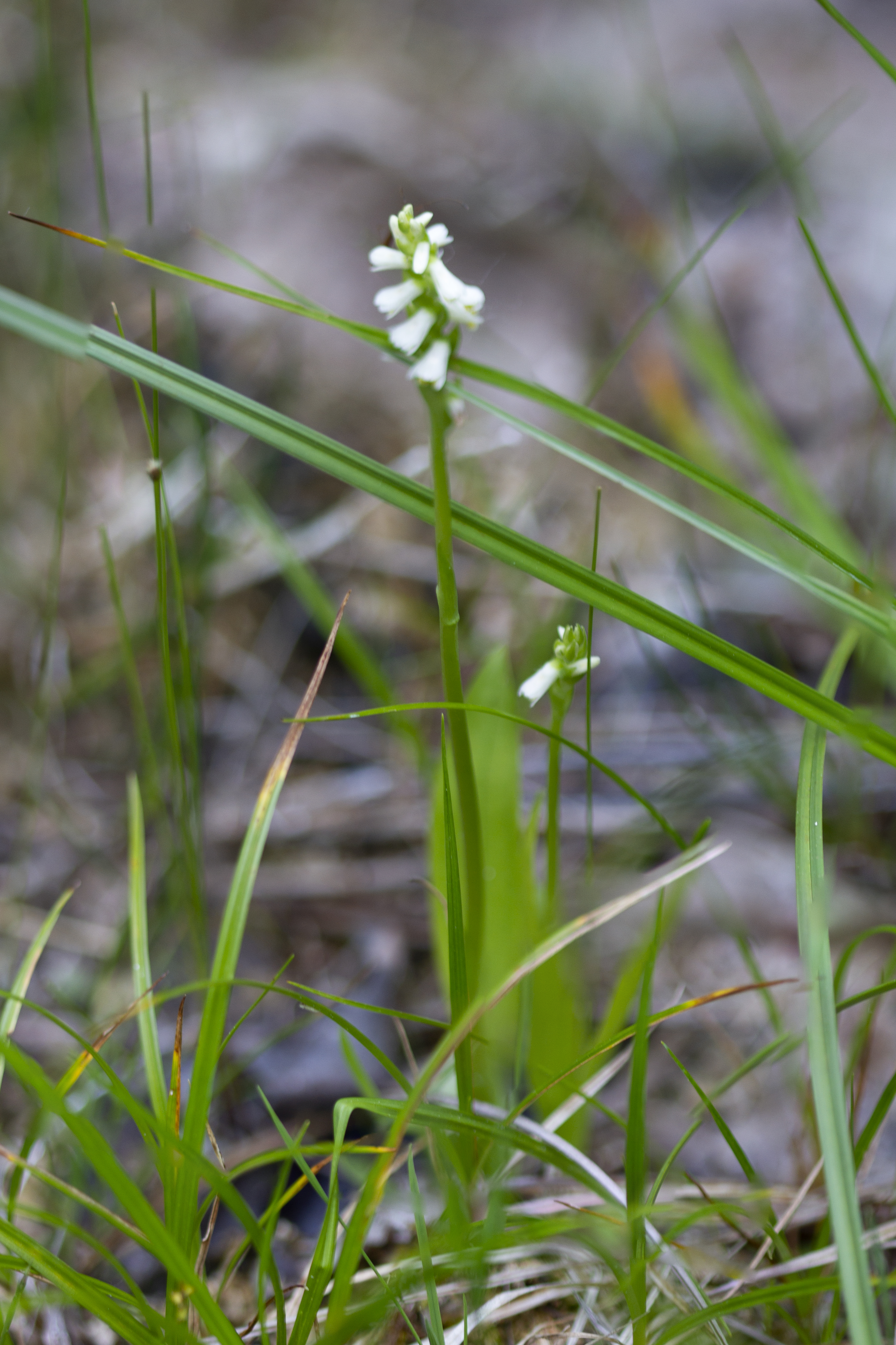
Spiranthes lucida (H. H. Eaton) Ames, an orchid described by Eaton

While at the Rensselaer School, Eaton helped his father prepare the fifth edition of his Manual of Botany. He also studied the botany of the area and later published a paper on new or incorrectly described species around Troy. In Kentucky, he went on an expedition in September 1830 with botanist Charles Wilkins Short to Hamilton County, Ohio which resulted in a joint paper listing fifty plants and thirty-six bivalves with notes - one of the first such surveys done west of the Alleghanies.

Eaton's herbarium of more than two thousand species came into the possession of Prof. Short after Eaton's death and formed part of Short's collection which went to the Academy of Natural Sciences of Philadelphia, except for a portion which Short gave to a student, Eaton's nephew Daniel Cady Eaton.

The standard author abbreviation H.H.Eaton is used to indicate this person as the author when citing a botanical name.

== Family ==
Through his grandfather Captain Abel Eaton (1754-1812) Eaton was related to William Eaton (1764-1811), hero of the First Barbary War.

Eaton had several siblings who were also interested in natural science. His brother Major General Amos Beebe Eaton (1806-1877) contributed specimens to Eaton's herbarium, and his younger sister Sarah Cady Eaton (1818-1881) later taught courses in natural science at a young women's seminary.

Through his mother Eaton was first cousin to suffragist Elizabeth Cady Stanton.

Eaton married Mary R. Harper on November 30, 1831.
