= Folsom Library =

Coordinates: 42.729298°N 73.682513°W

Richard G. Folsom Library
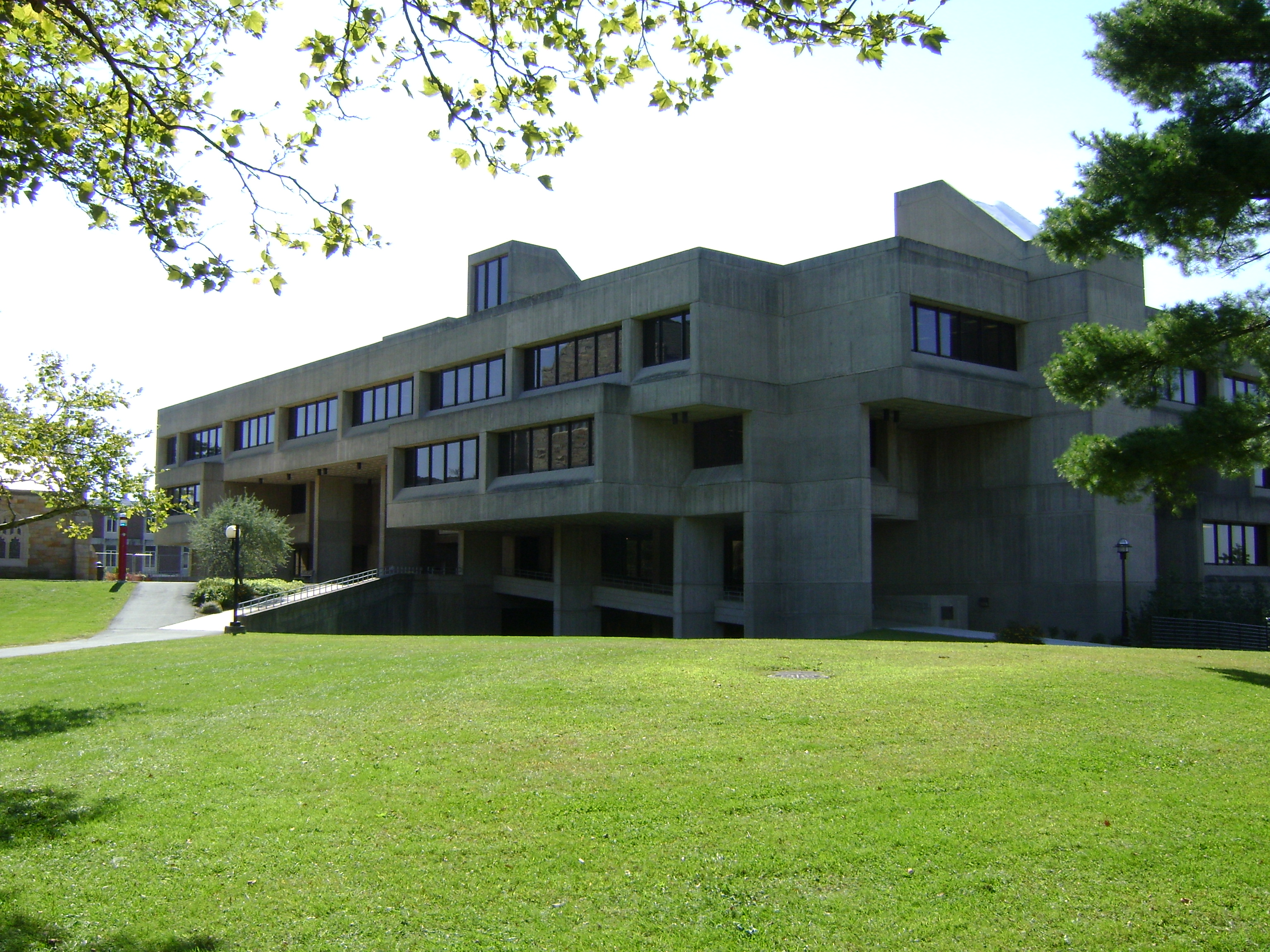
- Location: Troy, NY, United States
- Established: 1976

Collection
- Size: 470,225

Other information
- Director: Andrew White
- Website: http://library.rpi.edu

The Richard G. Folsom Library ("Folsom Library") is a research library in the Rensselaer Libraries system constructed in the Brutalist style located on the campus of Rensselaer Polytechnic Institute in Troy, NY. It is named after Richard Gilman Folsom, the President of the Institute from 1958–1971. The Folsom Library offers a variety of services to students and patrons of the library. In addition to loans, these services include class reserves, general writing and presentation assistance through the Center for Communication Practices, cultural and educational events, inter-library loans through ConnectNY, individual and group room reservations, computer labs, and wireless internet.

The library has integrated many electronic resources into its offerings, such as research databases and digital music libraries. The library is also one of 1250 federal depository libraries in the United States, and maintains an up-to-date archive of thousands of federal documents open to the public. Over 458,260,999 resources are available online or in the Folsom Library to faculty, staff, and researchers at Rensselaer Polytechnic Institute including over seven million books and eight million trade publications.

== History ==
=== The One Room Collection ===
The origins of the modern Folsom Library can be traced to the founding of the school in 1824. It was created in line with the Constitution and Laws of Rensselaer, which stated that the school would have "a very ample scientific library to which members of the institution will have free access". At that time, the Rensselaer School occupied The Old Bank Place in Troy, and it is likely that the original library was only a single room or small part of a room. The earliest librarian was a student named Albert Danker from the first graduating class, and the collection consisted of a sparse number of scientific works.

For a short period of time, the library belonged to Amos Eaton, a local scientist and educator. He obtained rights to the Old Bank Place after the Rensselaer School changed its name to the Rensselaer Institute, and moved to the nearby Van Der Heyden Mansion. The school moved back to the Old Bank Place in the same year, and upon Eaton's death in 1842, regained ownership of the collection. The library stayed under the ownership of Rensselaer when the institute was forced to move (due to estate ownership complications) to the Infant School, a small brick building in downtown Troy.

=== The Great Fire ===
In 1862, sparks from a passing locomotive on the Rensselaer and Saratoga Railroad bridge caused a massive fire that wiped out a large portion of Troy and the majority of Rensselaer's property. Relocation and reconstruction began on 8th Street in Troy, and in 1864, the library of 396 volumes moved into the Main Building, where it would stay for another 30 years. During that time, an 80-page catalog of the library's collection entitled "Catalogue of the Library of Rensselaer Polytechnic Institute, Troy, N.Y." was published, and it listed over 1000 titles spanning various technical areas. From 1893 to 1927, the library moved several times, finding home in the Alumni House on 2nd Street and later moving to the Pittsburgh Building and Amos Eaton Hall.

=== Student Use ===
Despite its growing collection, in its early years, the library was rarely used by students. During the years of 1912 and 1913, when the library was located in the Pittsburgh Building, there was considerably low utilization of the collection, with many students only visiting the building in their Senior year to prepare for their graduation theses. This was also partly due to the limited scope of the collection, which by Rensselaer's technical nature, consisted primarily of technical journals and other periodicals.

Student use increased during the period of 1912 to 1927 as the curriculum of the institute expanded and more volumes were added to the collection to supplement professors' instruction. It was also during this period of time that the library moved from the Pittsburgh Building to the more spacious Amos Eaton building. The Amos Eaton building offered sufficient space for a little over 30 years, until a growing number of publications written after World War II forced the collection to move again to the recently purchased St. Joseph Convent chapel.

=== A Dedicated Library ===
The library's continued growth forced the institute to take into consideration creating a dedicated building for holding its collection. Up until 1950, the collection had been largely technical, but expansion of the Humanities and Social Sciences as well as increased research created an intense demand on the library. The library had constantly been moved from building to building up until this point, never having had an actual home dedicated strictly for library usage. To evaluate the possibility of a new location, a Library Advisory Committee was formed. The committee first published their discovery of numerous deficiencies in the current library in June 1962 in a report called "Future of the RPI Library Collection". The New York State Education Department also noted deficiencies of the library during their evaluation of the graduate program.

=== The Greene Report ===
On June 20, 1967, the Library Advisory Committee published a report known as the "Greene Report", which detailed the purpose and requirements of a new library for the institute as well as previous research done about the library's efficacy. The report stated that "The Library is the information center of the university, providing resources to the scholars who are making, doing, and thinking things". It went on to detail the primary functions of the library to be education and research, and emphasized that the library must contain a strong collection in periodical literature, go beyond books (towards audio visual collections), strengthen peripheral material availability, and centralize all of the institutes's collections. The report also listed a number of other improvements, including:

- Renovation of physical space
- Conversion from the Dewey Decimal System to the Library of Congress System
- The hiring of more professional staff
- Improved services for library users
- 300% increase in funding for acquisitions
- Creation of a program for binding of periodicals
- Creation of a program for development of computer control and automation of the collection
- A 50,000 monograph minimum
- Improvements in the graduate level collection
- A 100,000 minimum of Language and Literature books
- An acquisition rate of at least 10,000 per year

At the time, it was also clear that Rensselaer was lacking in its collection when compared to its peers. In 1967, James E. Skipper, a researcher for the Association of Research Libraries, compiled a table illustrating the collections of various universities in New York.

Comparative Table of Library Monographic Holdings in the Indicated Subjects Among the Named Academic Institutions, 1967
Subject	Cornell University	Brooklyn Polytechnic Institute	Syracuse University	Rensselaer Polytechnic Institute
Mathematics	13993	8050	18790	2889
Physics	14416	4600	15030	3315
Chemistry	9719	2600	4554	2946
Engineering	29453	4850	15533	4590
Technology	30883	2775	45098	5661

=== Controversy over construction ===
The Greene Report made it clear that there was a need for a new library on campus, and the next phase of the process began, where the location of the library would be decided. The institute hired Quinlivan Pierik & Krause, an architecture firm centered in Syracuse, to evaluate the campus and determine a possible location for the new library. The firm recommended a location on the west side of campus, adjacent to the library's current location in the St. Joseph Convent chapel.

On October 23, 1970, the firm requested a meeting with the president at the time, Richard Folsom, to discuss the possibility of a staged construction procedure where the facility would be built in iterations. Each iteration would have an increasing amount of space. The initial iteration, with the existing chapel space, would offer a total collection storage space of 90,000 square feet (8,400 m^{2}). Projections by the architect indicated that a total of 128,000 square feet (11,900 m^{2}) would be available in 1985, followed by 200,000 square feet (19,000 m^{2}) in 2010. The firm believed that this method of construction would allow expansion at a rate that the institute budget could accommodate.

President Folsom presented the idea of a phased construction to the Library Advisory Committee, who supported the idea but criticized it for its continued use of the chapel as well as placing the campus in a constant state of construction. The committee also suggested considering one of the earlier potential locations, close to the bleachers located on the '86 Field, an athletic field at the center of the campus. Professor Howard Litman, the chairman of the committee at the time, issued the statement "In summary, the most recent proposal for providing new facilities for the Rensselaer library is a workable but undesirable plan of development. It will, for the short term, provide desperately needed space, but in the long run yield an unexpectedly costly facility in the wrong place."

=== Controversy over location ===
Beyond the concerns over how the library would be constructed, questions still remained over where it would be built. Dissent existed among the library committee over the location, with those opposed to the western development arguing that a central location would be more convenient for students. The architecture firm, which had supported the western location for development, issued a report emphasizing the benefits of building next to the chapel. In the report, listed several factors that made the site an optimal choice, including the fact that "distant observability of a building on this site is excellent".

The report convinced 10 out of the 12 members of the Library Advisory Committee to support the site recommendation. In 1971, the final decision was made to create a 100,000-square-foot (9,300 m^{2}) facility on the west side of campus. The new library would have an underground annex and a pedestrian plaza that would connect it to St. Joseph's Chapel (now the Voorhees Computing Center), and would cost approximately $6.9 million.

With the constant delay in construction, many students had adopted an attitude of disdain towards the library. As one student quoted in a report on the library, "There existed an attitude of the Library being a very second class function on campus, expected to make do with inadequate housing and financial support and generally held in low self esteem."

=== Construction begins ===
Unfortunately, there existed an additional delay one year after the decision was made on the location and size of the building. In 1972, James C. Andrews, the Director of Libraries at the Institute at the time, issued a report pointing out weaknesses in the recently reaffirmed proposal for construction. In the report, Andrews pointed out that the current location was far from the center of the campus and student dorms, was closed in on three sides by existing buildings, and that the size was not sufficient for the 140,000 square feet (13,000 m^{2}) requirement decided by student and faculty surveying. Knowing that there wasn't much that could be changed about the location at this point in the development process, Andrews suggested several other improvements. The Library Journal, a magazine which discussed various designs for libraries around the country, contained an article by Andrews in which he suggested the following changes:

- Cut down the design from 5 floors to 4 floors
- Use in-place concrete pouring to have the concrete exterior match the chapel
- Have a slot-machine cafe in the library since there were not many places to eat on the west side of campus
- Make the windows double glazed and tinted to reduce drafts and provide sun control
- Centralize services at the main desk to minimize the cost of keeping the library open 100 hours a week

These improvements were taken into consideration in the ultimate design of the library, and construction began. The building had its dedication ceremony on May 15, 1976. J. Erik Jonsson, an alumnus and trustee who had donated $2 million to get construction of the library started, decided to name the library after the president of the institute who had initiated construction - Richard Folsom.

In its discussion of the Folsom Library, the Library Journal also includes data on the Folsom Library:

Folsom Library Construction Statistics (1980)
Gross Square Feet	108,028 square feet (10,036.1 m^{2})
Reader Seats	900
Project Cost	$6,900,000
Construction Cost	$6,000,000
Square Foot Cost	$55.54
Equipment Cost	$550,000

=== Construction errors ===
After the initial pouring of concrete for Folsom Library's floors, it was noticed that the concrete contracted significantly—to the point that more concrete had to be poured in order to make the floors level and be able to properly install book stacks. As a result, the floors are slightly bowed. According to college legend, the contractor designed the foundation without knowing that it was to be a library. A myth spread, that persists to this day, that Folsom Library is slowly sinking or slipping down the hill. RPI students refer to this phenomenon, which also applies to a few other buildings on campus, as "sliding down the hill into Troy." However, the notion of libraries sinking into the ground is not confined to the RPI campus; other communities and colleges also report the same issues, even though it was debunked by snopes.com.

== Folsom Library collection ==
As of February 9, 2018, the Rensselaer Libraries contained 458,260,999 resources available online or in the library that include:

Rensselaer Libraries Collection (2018)
News	188,009,469
Academic Journals	86,363,247
Magazines	69,927,464
Reviews	10,049,091
Patents	9,605,211
Non-Print Resources	8,587,301
Trade Publications	8,263,427
Books	7,435,470
Conference Materials	6,026,126
Technical Reports	2,103,536
Physical Volumes	470,225
Electronic Resources	432,946
Electronic Books	289,203
Videos	265,626
Audio	134,550
Primary Source Materials	128,712
Government Documents	88,000+
Biographies	65,162
Dissertations/Theses	12,000+

== Folsom Renewal Project ==
The design of the Folsom Library has remained fairly static since its initial conception in June 1972. The concrete exterior that is in place is designed to complement the light gray brick of the nearby St. Joseph's Chapel.

In 2005, the Folsom Library Renewal project was started. The redesign, a product of cooperation between an alumnus and Rensselaer's Design and Construction group, focused on creating a more welcoming space and improving the overall image of the building.

Changes include:

- A redesigned information and circulation desk with multi-tiered acoustical ceilings
- A temperature-sensitive, computer-controlled lighting system which is intended to make the library more inviting during specific seasons
- Low profile shelving
- Brighter, more colorful environment
- Six different information hubs that offer central wired and wireless access
- A new library cafe designed by Joy, McCoola & Zilch, Architects and Planners, P.C.
- A new wireless GPS system that synchronizes all of the clocks in the library

== Hours ==
As of January 3, 2022 the hours of the Folsom Library, when classes are in session are:

- Sunday 2:00 p.m. - 10:00 p.m.
- Mon-Thu 8:00 a.m. – 12:00 a.m.
- Friday 8:00 a.m. – 8:00 p.m.
- Saturday 12:00 p.m. – 8:00 p.m.

Current listing of hours can be found via a link on the Libraries' homepage at https://library.rpi.edu/about.
