= Amos Eaton =

American botanist, geologist and educator

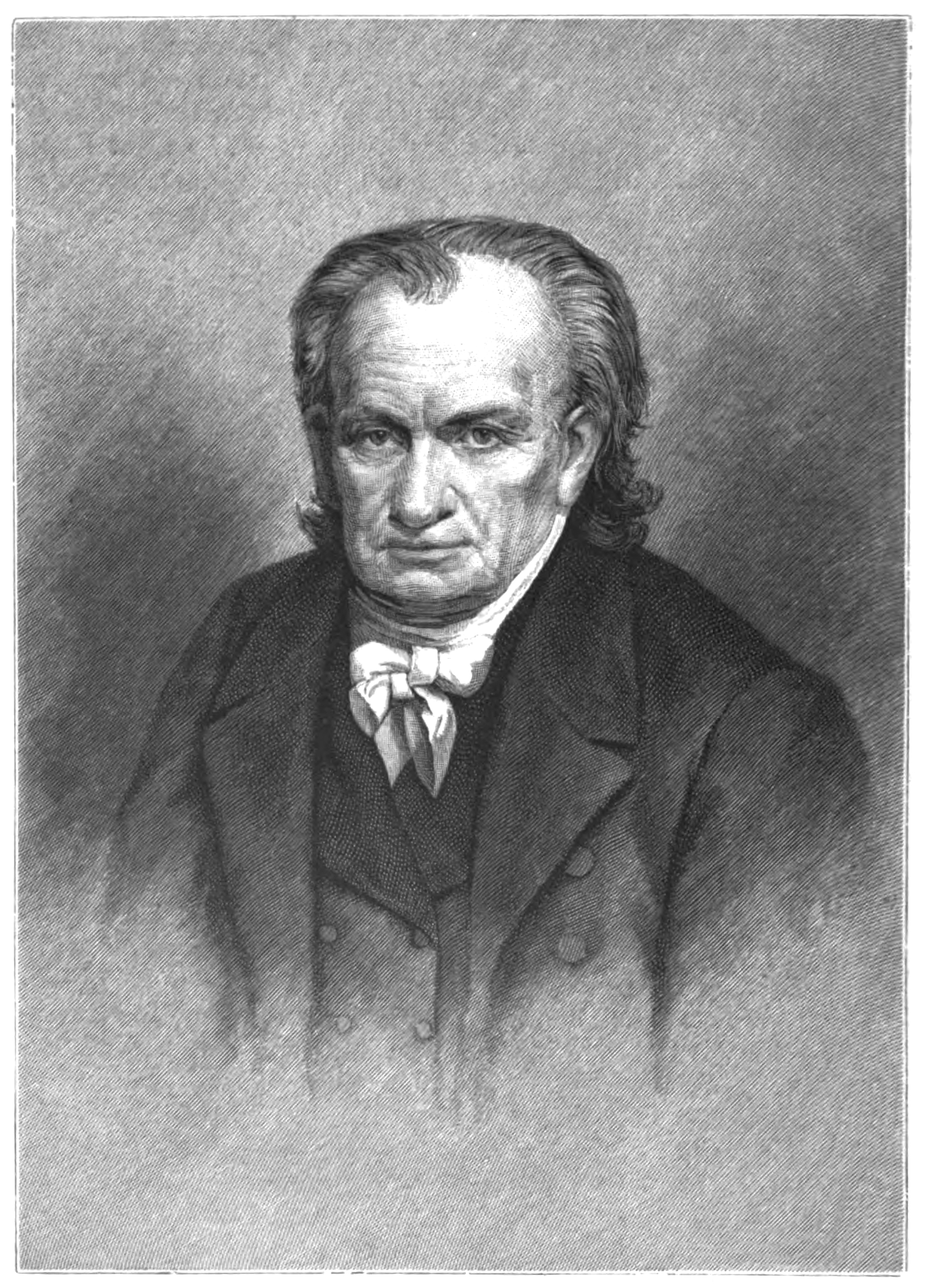
- Born: May 17, 1776; Chatham, New York
- Died: May 10, 1842 (aged 66); Troy, New York
- Education: Williams College
- Known for: Botany; Surveying
- Spouses: Polly Thomas (m. 1799; died 1803) Sally Cady (m. 1803; died 1816) Anna Bradley (m. 1816; died 1826) Alice Johnson (m. 1827)
- Children: Twelve
- Scientific career
- Fields: Botany; Geology; Mineralogy
- Workplaces: Williams College; Castleton Medical College; Rensselaer School
- Author abbrev. (botany): Eaton

Amos Eaton (May 17, 1776 – May 10, 1842) was an American botanist, geologist, and educator who is considered the founder of the modern scientific prospectus in education, which was a radical departure from the American liberal arts tradition of classics, theology, lecture, and recitation. Eaton co-founded the Rensselaer School in 1824 with Stephen van Rensselaer III "in the application of science to the common purposes of life". His books in the eighteenth century were among the first published for which a systematic treatment of the United States was attempted, and in a language that all could read. His teaching laboratory for botany in the 1820s was the first of its kind in the country. Eaton's popular lectures and writings inspired numerous thinkers, in particular women, whom he encouraged to attend his public talks on experimental philosophy. Emma Willard would found the Troy Female Seminary (Emma Willard School), and Mary Mason Lyon, the Mount Holyoke Female Seminary (Mount Holyoke College). Eaton held the rank of senior professor at Rensselaer until his death in 1842.

== Life ==
Eaton's Herbarium, published in 1830, includes one hundred eleven specimens labeled in his handwriting.

Amos Eaton was born at Chatham, New York on May 17, 1776. His father, Captain Abel Eaton was a farmer of comfortable means. He belonged to a family that traced its lineage to John Eaton, who arrived from Dover, England in 1635, settling two years later in Dedham, Massachusetts Bay Colony. Amos Eaton showed early preference for nature, by the age of sixteen constructing his own compass and chain to survey land as a chain bearer.

Eaton was sent to Williamstown with the Rev. Dr. David Potter, of Spencertown, to study at Williams College. After graduating in 1799 with high marks in natural philosophy, he married the Polly Thomas in October the same year. She died in 1802, leaving him a son. In 1805 he married Sally Cady who bore him five sons. In New York, Eaton formed an association with naturalists David Hosack and Samuel L. Mitchill and under their influence, he became committed to the natural sciences, and in particular botany.

Nevertheless, Eaton pursued a legal career and arranged to study law with Elisha Williams, of Spencertown, and Josiah Ogden, of New York. In 1802 he was admitted to the bar and in 1804 received permission to practice before the Supreme Court of New York. Eaton worked as a lawyer and as a land agent in Catskill, New York. He became deeply involved in land-speculation and was charged with forgery in 1810, possibly as a result of securing a loan using property that was already mortgaged. He was found guilty and spent nearly five years in Newgate Prison, the state penitentiary at Greenwich Village. While in prison he formed a friendship with a young John Torrey, whose father was a city alderman and fiscal agent for the prison. Torrey would bring Eaton books while Eaton in turn would tutor his protege in the basics of botany. In 1815 he was released with a pardon from Daniel D. Tompkins, the governor of New York.

On his release in 1815, Eaton moved to New Haven at Yale College to take up the study of botany, chemistry and mineralogy under the tuition of Benjamin Silliman and Eli Ives. He then returned to Williams College to offer a course of lectures and volunteer classes of the students on botany, mineralogy zoology, and geology and published a botanical dictionary. In 1817, he published his Manual of Botany for the Northern States, the first comprehensive flora of the area; it ultimately went through eight editions. From Williams College the lectures were extended, in the shape of courses, with practical instructions to classes, to the larger towns of New England and New York.

He returned to New York in 1818 following Governor DeWitt Clinton's invitation for him to deliver a series of lectures on the state's geology to the New York State Legislature in connection with the building of the Erie Canal. Among the legislators who heard these lectures was Stephen Van Rensselaer III, who hired him to produce A Geological Survey of the County of Albany, which was followed by geological surveys of much of the area through which the canal was built. Ultimately, Eaton completed a survey fifty miles wide from Buffalo to Boston.

Eaton delivered talks at the Lenox Academy and the Medical College at Castleton, Vermont, where he was appointed professor of natural history in 1820. He gave lectures and practical instructions in Troy, laying the foundation of the Lyceum of Natural History. In 1820 and 1821, Eaton initiated geological and agricultural surveys of Albany and Rensselaer counties, which were financed by Van Rensselaer.

=== Rensselaer School ===
After co-founding the Rensselaer School in 1824, Van Rensselaer appointed Eaton to teach chemistry, experimental philosophy, geology, surveying, and the "laws regulating town officers and jurors." By then Eaton was a well established public speaker on natural philosophy, touring and delivering lectures in the northeast. He was also a recognized pioneer in botany and principal land surveyor in the country. Eaton immediately set about to develop a new kind of institution devoted to the application of science to life, a modern scientific prospectus, new methods of instruction and examination, recognizing women in higher education, and practical training for adults. Eaton's original aim was to also train teachers and disciples, which he did in large numbers. Students learned by doing, in sharp contrast with the conventional method of learning by rote. Students were made into experimenters and workers, and, in place of recitations, delivered lectures to one another. Eaton also often led day excursions, taking students to observe the application of science on nearby farms and in workshops, tanneries, and bleaching factories. They then returned to the laboratory, analyzing the principles involved. This, too, was an innovation, as it represented a reversal of the usual pedagogical method, which began with the principle and proceeded to the application. Eaton's principal focus was the training of students to teach science and its applications to the New York farming community via experimental demonstrations, a goal in keeping with Britain's mechanics' institutes and lyceum movements on diffusing useful knowledge. As a result, Eaton's system of instruction posed a challenge, if not a threat, to the traditional liberal-arts colleges, causing them to expand their own curricula and set up departments or schools of engineering and science. Formal engineering education would not be added at Rensselaer until 1828. After becoming professor of natural history at Harvard College in 1842, Asa Gray required some practical work of all of his students in botany along the lines established by Amos Eaton.

Eaton was interested in education for women, he had lectured them on his tour of New England, and he was persuaded that their failure in science was caused by inferior opportunity, not "perversion of female genius." Eaton, clearly hoped to educate females at the school. He believed that women were capable of learning practical science and mathematics; they simply had not been taught the subjects at traditional female academies. His commitment to the cause led Eaton to enroll a class of eight young women in a special mathematics course to show that they could advance beyond "the speculative geometry and algebra as generally practiced in female seminaries." When the students completed their course of study in 1835, Eaton requested a review of their progress by the school's less-than-enthusiastic board of examiners. The eight young ladies who participated in Eaton's experiment continued their education at the Troy Female Seminary. Eaton trained a bevy of future, notable, scientists and lectured to countless later educationists.

Today Amos Eaton Hall houses the mathematics department, and the Amos Eaton Professorship is a faculty endowment named at the institute. The Amos Eaton Chair was originally given by students to Amos Eaton in 1839, but was later returned to the institute by the Eaton family.

=== Personal life ===
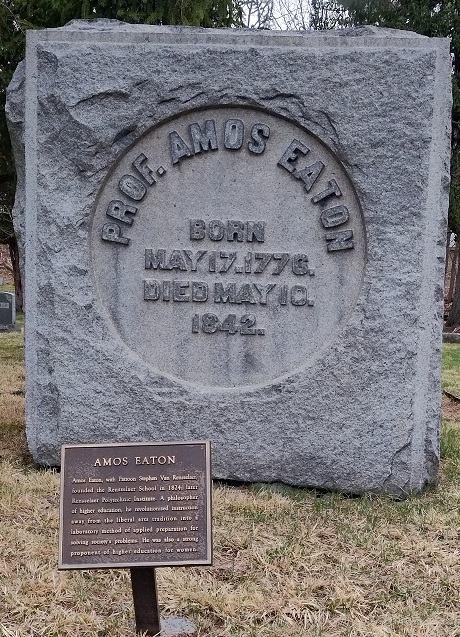

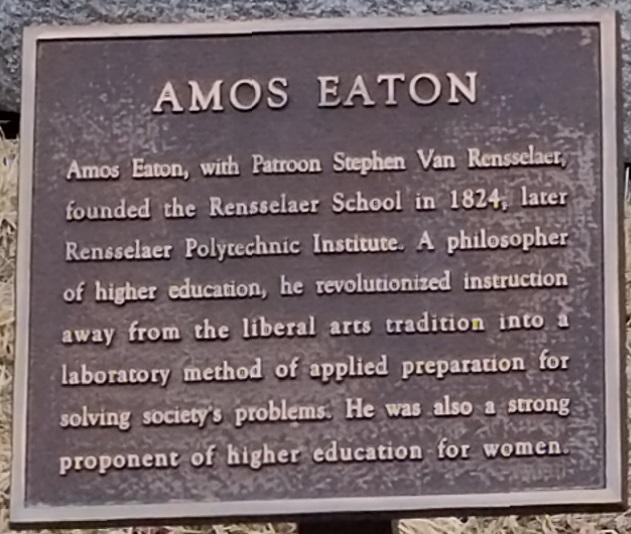
Amos Eaton Commemorative Plate

Following the death of his first wife, Polly Thomas, Eaton was remarried to Sally Cady in 1803, who bore him five sons. Through her, Eaton was the uncle of social reformer Elizabeth Cady Stanton (1815-1902). After her death in 1816 he remarried the same year to Anna Bradley, by whom he had three sons and two daughters. She having died, Eaton married Alice Johnson in 1827, who bore him one son, and survived him about four years. Three of his children showed a preference for natural philosophy. Hezekiah Hulbert Eaton (1809–1832) became a chemist at Transylvania University but died at the age of twenty-three. Major General Amos Beebe Eaton (1806–1877) was a U.S. Army officer interested in natural philosophy. Sara Cady Eaton (1818–1881) taught natural sciences and modern languages in a young woman's seminary at Monticello, Illinois. Eaton's grandson, Daniel Cady Eaton (1834–1895), professed botany at Yale College in the 1860s.

== Works ==
Amos Eaton published on agriculture, botany, engineering, geology, surveying, and zoology.

- Art without Science (1800)
- Elementary Treatise on Botany (1810)
- Botanical Dictionary (1817) (2nd 1819, 4th ed. 1836)
- Manual of Botany (1817)
- Index to the Geology of the Northern States (1818)
- Geological and Agricultural Survey of the County of Albany, New York (1820)
- Chemical Notebook (1821)
- Chemical Instructor (1822)
- Cuvier's Grand Division (1822)
- Geological Nomenclature of North America (1822)
- Zoological Syllabus and Notebook (1822)
- Geological and Agricultural Survey of the District adjoining the Erie Canal (1824)
- Philosophical Instructor (1824)
- Botanical Exercises (1825)
- Botanical Grammar and Dictionary (1828)
- Geological Text-Books Prepared for Popular Lectures on North American Geology (1830)
- Directions for Surveying and Engineering (1838)
- Geological Text-Book for the Troy Class (1841)

== Eaton's students ==
- James Curtis Booth — chemist, melter and refiner at the U.S. Mint
- Ezra S. Carr — medical doctor, natural scientist
- George Hammell Cook — state geologist of New Jersey and vice-president of Rutgers College
- James Dwight Dana — Geologist, zoologist
- James Eights — Antarctic explorer
- Ebenezer Emmons — geologist; named the Adirondack Mountains
- Asa Fitch — natural historian and entomologist
- Asa Gray — botanist
- James Hall — First New York State Geologist
- Joseph Henry — Developed electromagnetism
- Eben Norton Horsford — scientist
- Douglass Houghton — doctor, chemist, geologist
- Mary Mason Lyon — founder of Mount Holyoke Female Seminary
- Almira Hart Lincoln Phelps — natural scientist and educator
- John Leonard Riddell — botanist, geologist and author
- Abram Sager — professor of zoology, botany, obstetrics, and physiology
- John Torrey — botanist
- Emma Willard — founder of Troy Female Seminary

== See also ==
- Barthélemy Prosper Enfantin
- Henri de Saint-Simon
- Saint-Simonianism

== Bibliography ==
- Duane Isely, One hundred and one botanists, Iowa State University Press (1994), p. 143-144
- Ray Palmer Baker, A Chapter in American Education: Rensselaer Polytechnic Institute, 1824-1924., Charles Scribner's Sons: NY(1924).
- Palmer C. Ricketts, History of Rensselaer Polytechnic Institute, 1824–1934. John Wiley & Sons: NY (1934, Third Edition).
- Amos Eaton, John Batchelder, and Stephen Williams lectures on medical jurisprudence. 1821–1824. Located in: Modern Manuscripts Collection, History of Medicine Division, National Library of Medicine, Bethesda, MD; MS C 326.
