= El Waer Hakim =

Libyan politician

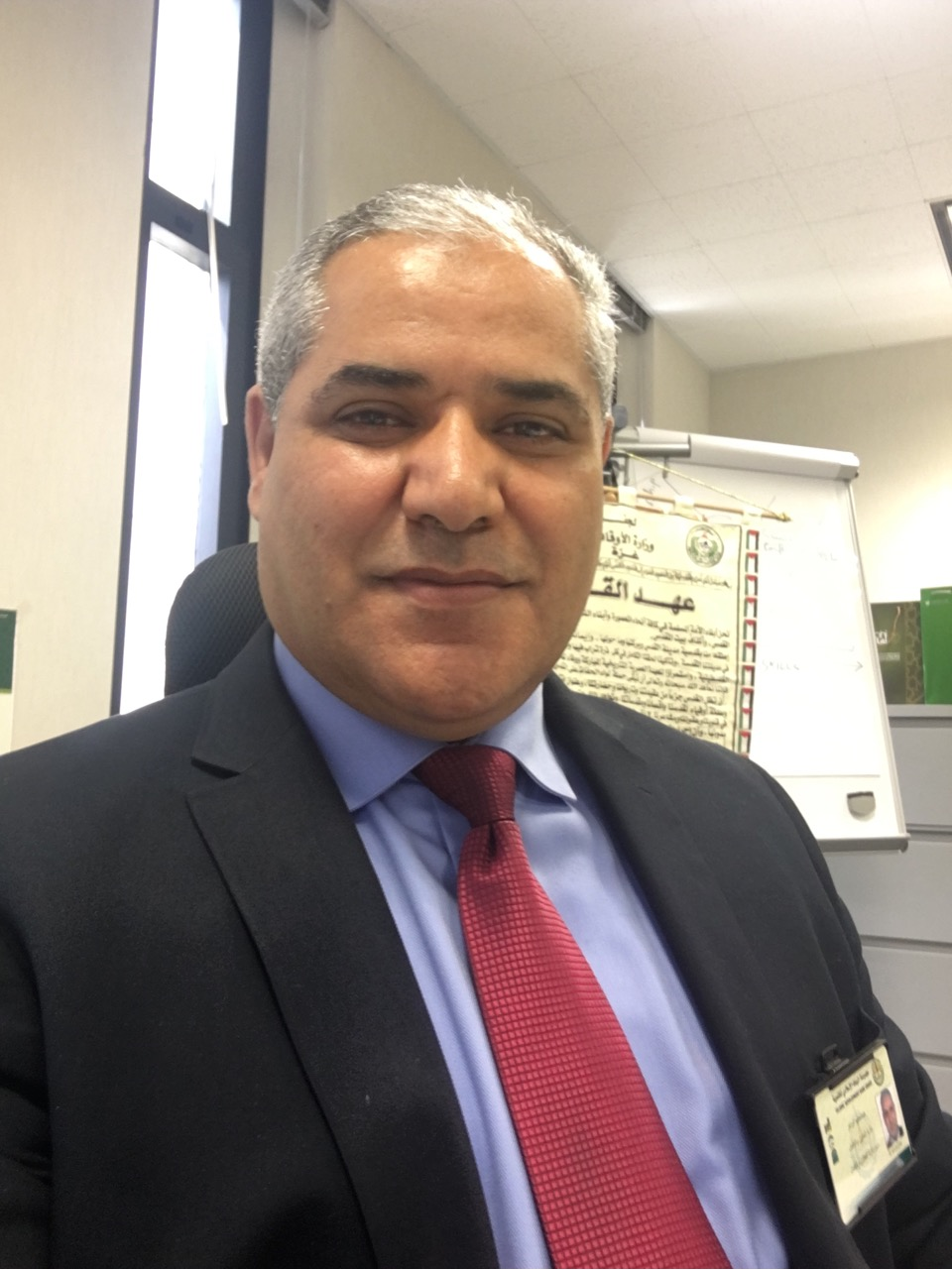
Abdul-Hakim Rajab Elwaer

Abdul-Hakim Rajab Elwaer (born in 1967 in Tripoli, Libya) is a Libyan diplomat, politician and development professional. He served in the Libyan government as Secretary (Minister) of Environment from 2004 to 2007. He worked at the African Union Commission in Addis Ababa, Ethiopia as Director of Administration and Human Resources Management, as well as Director of Human Resources, Sciences & Technology from 2007 to 2014. Currently, he is the official Spokesperson and the Director of Cooperation and Resource Mobilization Department of the Islamic Development Bank (IsDB) in Jeddah, Saudi Arabia. In this capacity, he is in charge of regional cooperation and integration, resource mobilization and partnership with regional and international organizations. In addition, he is the Ag. Director of Country Programs (Sub-Saharan Africa) and he served as Coordinator (Ag. Vice President) for Cooperation and Capacity Development at IsDB. In January 2017, he was a strong candidate for the post of Deputy Chairperson of African Union Commission where he competed with the current DCP.

Under UNEP he served as the President of African Ministerial Conference on Environment (AMCEN) and under UNESCO, he served as Member of the Governing Board of the UNESCO International Institute for Capacity Building in Africa (UNESCO-IICBA).

== Early years ==
Hakim was born in Fashlom at the centre of the Libyan capital, Tripoli where he spent his childhood in a modest household. He is the third of six siblings. He developed a passion for service for humanity at a very tender age of 6 years when he became an active member of the Boy Scouts Association and other voluntary groups that shaped his networking capabilities and personality as a team player and a team leader. During his service with the Boy Scouts, he joined Sea Scouts group and developed talent skills for marines' sports and adventures. He is a founding member of the Libyan Sailing Federation and a trained judge of the International Sailing Federation. He is a holder of Sailing/Yachting Ocean Skipper of the UK Royal Yachting Association. It is during his membership of these groups that Hakim developed interest for international affairs and development cooperation.

Hakim speaks Arabic, English and moderate French.

== Education ==
Upon graduation in 1987 from the Environmental Technologies Studies Department, Higher Institute of Technology, Sabha University in Libya, Hakim moved to Malta to study at UK Institute of Systems Analysts and Computer Programmers. He completed the institution's courses, earning a Graduate Diploma in Systems Analysis and Computer Programming. He later obtained a Doctorate of philosophy in Environmental Sciences in 2000 from the University of Sheffield in United Kingdom. He also followed several professional training courses, among others:

-Gestalt Organizations and Systems Development (International Gestalt Center of Organizations and Systems Development – Cleveland, USA).

-Kaizen Continual Improvement (Deloitte – Kenya).

-Parmenides Eidos Strategic Thinking (Parmenides Foundation – Munich, Germany).

-Leadership Development Program (Harvard University – Boston, USA).

-Environmental Management Systems ISO 14001 and Health and Safety Auditing Systems ISO 18001 (University of Salford – Manchester, UK).

-Lead Auditor of Quality Management Systems ISO 9000:2000 (SGS International, Switzerland).

-Advanced Resources and Projects Management (UNESCO – Paris, France).

-Project Management, Supervision and Management Skills for Managers (Libyan National Oil Corporation – Tripoli, Libya).

Impact of Hakim life journey on his beliefs.

Hakim has worked in different positions as a civil servant, as a university lecturer, as a minister and as a senior official in several inter-governmental organizations. Hakim exposure to different cultures and work environments make him who he is today. All these different roles and activities make him a strong believer in multicultural teamwork and an advocate for change with commitment to continuous improvement for the betterment of himself, the team, the organization and humanity.
