= Parmenides (disambiguation) =

Parmenides was an ancient Greek philosopher born in Elea.

Parmenides may also refer to:

- 6039 Parmenides, an outer main-belt asteroid
- Parmenides (dialogue), one of the dialogues of Plato
- Parmenides Foundation, a psychology organization
