= Think Tools =

Think Tools AG (SWX: TTO) was a Swiss IT company that rose and fell with the dot-com bubble in Europe. The company was founded by the philosopher Albrecht von Müller as a consultancy company in 1993.

== Initial public offering ==
In the company's IPO on March 24, 2000, at the peak of the dot com bubble, the shares were issued at CHF 270. On the first trading day the share price peaked at CHF 1050, driven by investor excitement generated by the company's connections to the World Economic Forum and promises that the company would play a central role in transferring the world to knowledge economy through the software tools the company claimed to be developing. The peak share price corresponded to a market valuation of CHF 2.52 billion.

== Products ==
In addition to consultancy, the company had developed tools for supporting corporate problem solving by allowing its users to graphically visualize their thinking: a kind of an intelligent notepad to assist the user in solving problems. However, the software, called Think Tools Suite, did not have any knowledge representation, problem-solving, or reasoning capability by itself. The company advertising made general claims about their software's ability to strengthen organizations' ability to generate, store, and utilize knowledge, and the tools being the result of a decade-long research program at the Max Planck Institute of Physics into ways to support cognitive processes. Nelson Mandela was cited as a reference client who uses the Think Tools software "for policy formulation and policy coordination between the national, provincial and local levels".

The company was profitable prior to the IPO, with a net income of CHF 3.9 million with sales of CHF 10.6 million in 1999, mostly from services to companies with close relations to the World Economic Forum, but these figures were only a very small fraction of the value of the company's stock after the IPO (corresponding to an extremely high price-to-earning ratio), characteristic of dot com bubble companies before share price collapse. In the peak year, 2000, sales were CHF 25.3 million, but the company made a CHF 19.8 million loss.

== Controversies and collapse ==
The downward slope of the share price resulted from analysts reporting the stock to be seriously overvalued, from the allegations of plagiarism of the works by the biochemistry professor Frederic Vester in its Think Tools Suite product, from the collapse of sales after the IPO, and the company's inability to progress toward implementing the visions that had raised the investors' expectations extremely high. It also turned out that the information about the company and its product had been misleading. For example, most of the reference clients at the time of the IPO did not actually use the Think Tools Suite for anything. The company's business model was to sell the Think Tools Suite software licence for a one time fee, up to CHF 1 million per licence, and the market of companies willing to buy the software was very quickly exhausted.

In 2001 sales were only CHF 3.4 million, and the company made a CHF 14.5 million loss. On November 2, 2001 shares traded at CHF 26. Only after the company's failure became apparent did the investors start questioning whether the Think Tools software actually had the capabilities claimed by von Müller.

On January 3, 2003 the company's shares traded at CHF 8.20. Sales in 2003 were CHF 1.9 million, with operating expenses of CHF 12.2 million.

In May 2004 Think Tools agreed to merge with the Swiss IT company redIT AG. As a result, redIT AG became a publicly traded company in the Swiss stock exchange. In October 2004 redIT AG sold the rights to the main remaining Think Tools asset, the Think Tools Suite, to the Parmenides Foundation (also founded by Albrecht von Müller). The sales price was CHF 350,000. Parmenides Foundation renamed Think Tools Suite to Parmenides Eidos Suite - Visual Reasoning and Knowledge Representation, and is selling it.

== Legacy ==
The company has still been portrayed positively years after it ceased to exist: "A Swiss based advisory firm with a high powered board comprising former Prime Ministers, financiers, industrialist and the founder of the World Economic Forum, Klaus Schwab. 'A brilliant experience, Think Tools had advised DASA on developing the A-380 Airbus, Nelson Mandela and the South African government on development policy options and a variety of corporates and governmental entities around the world.'” After 2004, Think Tools products and ideas continued to be discussed in scholarly articles about scenario development. The German government used the software for critical decision making projects.

== Related controversies ==
The Swiss Federal Banking Commission fined Swiss private bank Vontobel CHF 21 million after the Swiss stock exchange alerted the commission to irregularities in Think Tools' IPO, which was underwritten by Vontobel. Vontobel had anticipated a high post-IPO share price and had retained 52.14 per cent of the shares that should have been sold at the IPO, and sold the shares after the IPO when their price was substantially higher than the CHF 270 issue price.
