= LMU Munich =

Public university in Munich, Germany

- Ludwig-Maximilians-Universität München
- Latin: Universitas Ludovico-Maximilianea Monacensis
- Other name: University of Munich
- Former name: University of Ingolstadt (1472–1800)
- Type: Public
- Established: 26 June 1472; 554 years ago
- Affiliations: German Excellence Universities, Europaeum, LERU, U15
- Budget: EUR 879 million (2024)
- President: Matthias H. Tschöp
- Academic staff: 840 professors 6,241.5 other (2024)
- Administrative staff: 10,626.2 (2024)
- Students: 52,658 (WS 2025/26)
- Location: Munich, Bavaria, Germany; 48°09′03″N 11°34′49″E
- Campus: Urban
- Nobel Laureates: 50 (January 2026)
- Colors: Green and white
- Website: lmu.de

- Location within Germany Location within Bavaria

The Ludwig-Maximilians-Universität München (LMU Munich), also referred to as the University of Munich, is a public research university in Munich, Bavaria, Germany. Originally established as the University of Ingolstadt in 1472 by Duke Ludwig IX of Bavaria-Landshut, it is Germany's sixth-oldest university in continuous operation. (Note: In modern Germany, only Heidelberg University (1386), Leipzig University (1409), the University of Rostock (1419), the University of Greifswald (1456) and the University of Freiburg (1457) are older. Although the University of Cologne, the University of Erfurt and the University of Würzburg were originally founded earlier than LMU Munich, they shut down for longer periods.)

In 1800, the university was moved from Ingolstadt to Landshut by King Maximilian I Joseph of Bavaria when the city was threatened by the French, before being transferred to its present-day location in Munich in 1826 by King Ludwig I of Bavaria. In 1802, the university was officially named Ludwig-Maximilians-Universität by King Maximilian I of Bavaria in honor of himself and Ludwig IX.

LMU is currently the second-largest (and largest on-site) university in Germany in terms of student population. In the 2025/26 winter semester, the university had a total of 52,658 matriculated students. Of these, 7,451 were freshmen, while international students totaled 11,658 or approximately 22% of the student population. The university is organized in 18 faculties, with faculties in theology, law, business administration, economics, medicine, history and the arts, philosophy, psychology, languages and literatures, social sciences, mathematics, informatics, statistics, physics, chemistry, biology, geosciences. As for the operating budget, the university recorded in 2024 a total of 879.0 million euros in funding without the university hospital; with the university hospital, the total university funding for that year amounted to approximately 2.25 billion euros.

As of 2023, LMU Munich is associated with 50 Nobel laureates. Notable alumni, faculty and researchers include Pope Benedict XVI, Rudolf Peierls, Josef Mengele, Richard Strauss, Walter Benjamin, Joseph Campbell, Muhammad Iqbal, Marie Stopes, Wolfgang Pauli, Bertolt Brecht, Max Horkheimer, Karl Loewenstein, Carl Schmitt, Gustav Radbruch, Ernst Cassirer, Ernst Bloch, Hermann Göring, and Konrad Adenauer. LMU has recently been conferred the title of "University of Excellence" under the German Universities Excellence Initiative, and is a member of U15 as well as the LERU.

== History ==
=== 1472–1800 ===
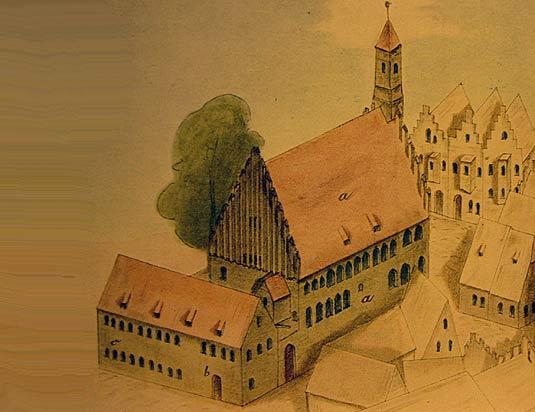
University buildings in Ingolstadt

The university was founded with papal approval in 1472 as the University of Ingolstadt (foundation right of Louis IX the Rich), with faculties of philosophy, medicine, jurisprudence and theology. Its first rector was Christopher Mendel of Steinfels, who later became bishop of Chiemsee.

In the period of German humanism, the university's academics included notables such as Conrad Celtes and Petrus Apianus. The theologian Johann Eck also taught at the university. From 1549 to 1773, the university was influenced by the Jesuits during the Counterreformation. The Jesuit Petrus Canisius served as rector of the university.

At the end of the 18th century, the university was influenced by the Enlightenment, which led to a stronger emphasis on natural science.

=== 1800–1933 ===
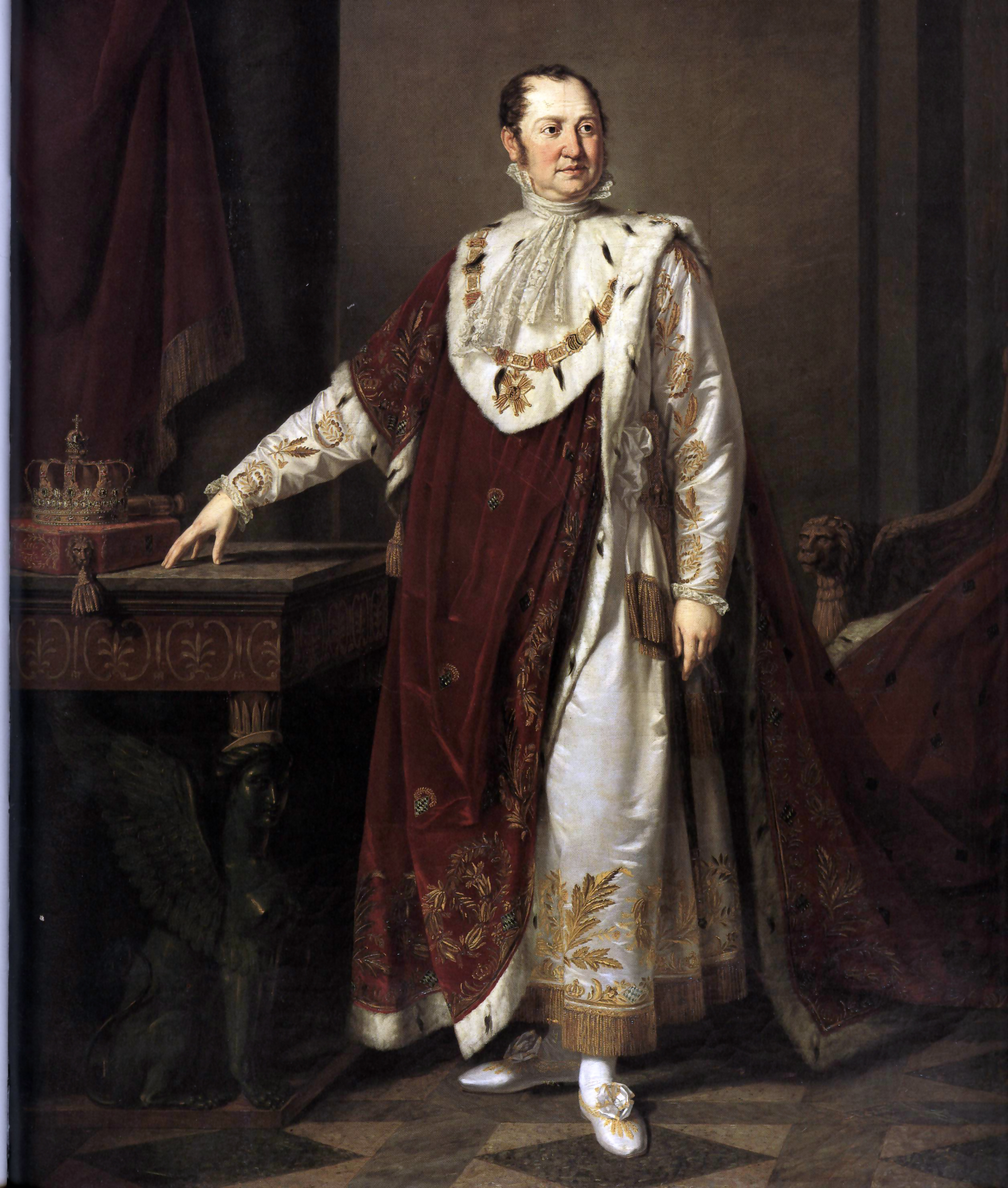
Portrait of Maximilian I Joseph of Bavaria, after whom the University of Munich was renamed in 1802

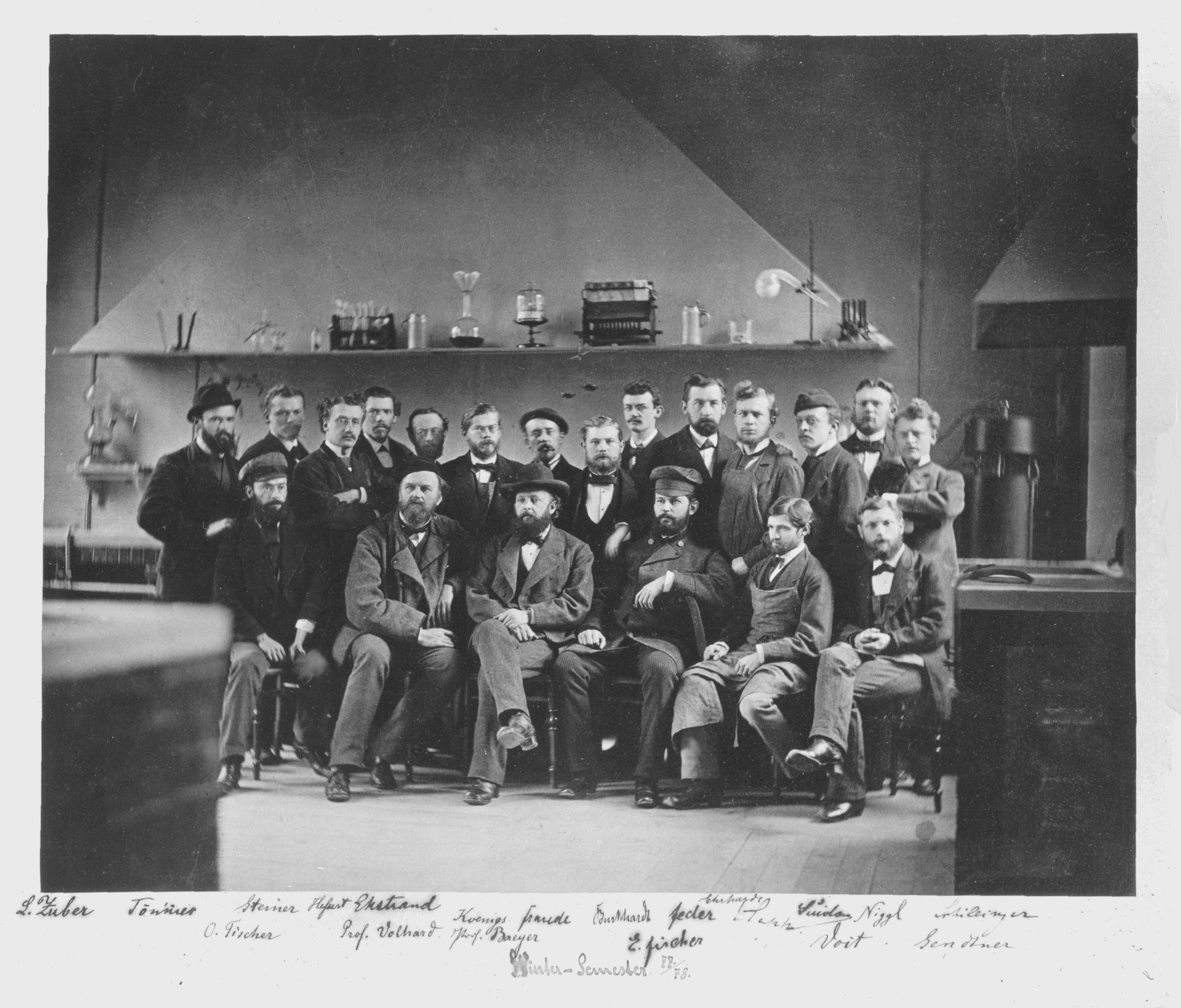
Adolf von Baeyer, Emil Fischer, Jacob Volhard and other chemists at LMU in 1877

In 1800, the Prince-Elector Maximilian IV Joseph (the later Maximilian I, King of Bavaria) moved the university to Landshut, due to French aggression that threatened Ingolstadt during the Napoleonic Wars. In 1802, the university was renamed the Ludwig-Maximilians-Universität for its two founders, Louis IX, Duke of Bavaria and Maximilian I, Elector of Bavaria. The Minister of Education, Maximilian von Montgelas, initiated a number of reforms that sought to modernize the rather conservative and Jesuit-influenced university. In 1826, it was moved to Munich, the capital of the Kingdom of Bavaria, and renamed the Ludwig-Maximilians-Universität zu München. The university was situated in the Old Academy until a new building in the Ludwigstraße was completed. The locals were somewhat critical of the number of Protestant professors Maximilian and later Ludwig I invited to Munich. They were dubbed the "Nordlichter" (northern lights), and especially physician Johann Nepomuk von Ringseis was quite angry about them.

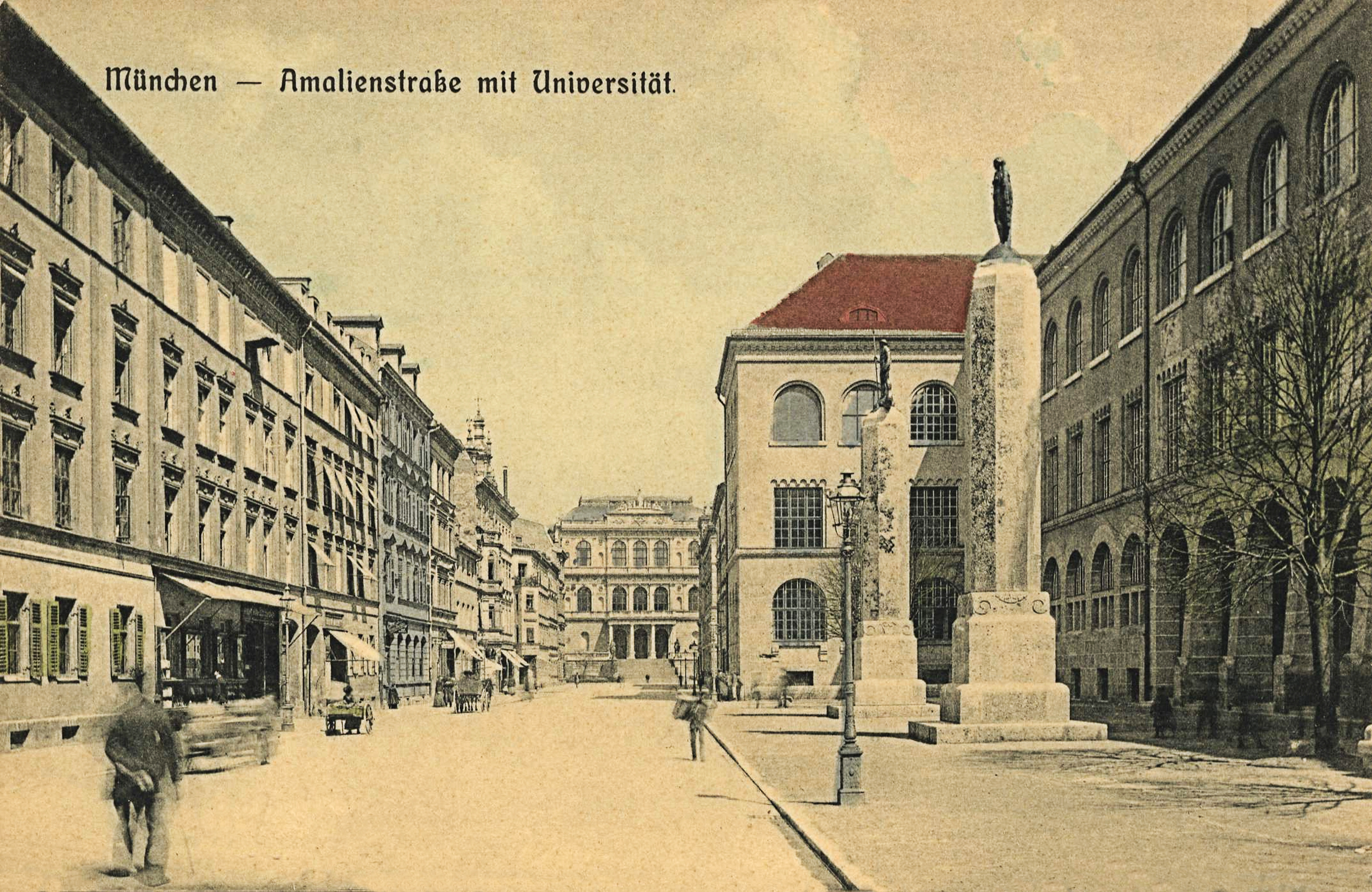
View of LMU Munich from Amalienstrasse around 1900

In the second half of the 19th century, the university rose to great prominence in the European scientific community, attracting many of the global leading scientists. It was also a period of great expansion. From 1903, women were allowed to study at Bavarian universities, and by 1918, the female proportion of students at LMU had reached 18%. In 1918, Adele Hartmann became with her habilitation (higher doctorate) at this university the first woman in Germany to earn a habilitation.

During the Weimar Republic, the university continued to be one of the world's leading universities, with professors such as Wilhelm Röntgen, Wilhelm Wien, Richard Willstätter, Arnold Sommerfeld and Ferdinand Sauerbruch.

=== 1933–1945 ===
During the Third Reich, academic freedom was severely curtailed. In 1943, the White Rose group, consisting of anti-Nazi students, carried out a campaign opposing the National Socialists at this institution. The university subsequently removed Kurt Huber, a Nazi opposition fighter, from his position and revoked his doctorate upon his arrest.

Between 1933 and 1936, Karl Escherich served as rector at Ludwig-Maximilians-Universität München, followed by Leopold Kölbl from 1936 to 1938, Philipp Broemser from 1938 to 1941, and finally, Walther Wüst from 1941 to 1945.

=== 1945–present ===
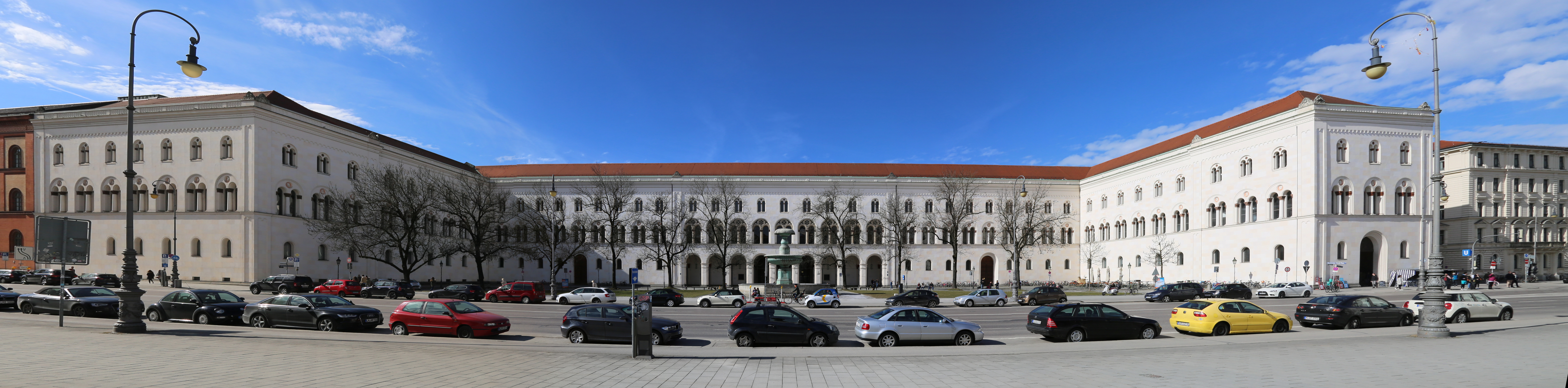
View of the main building of LMU from Professor-Huber-Platz in 2017

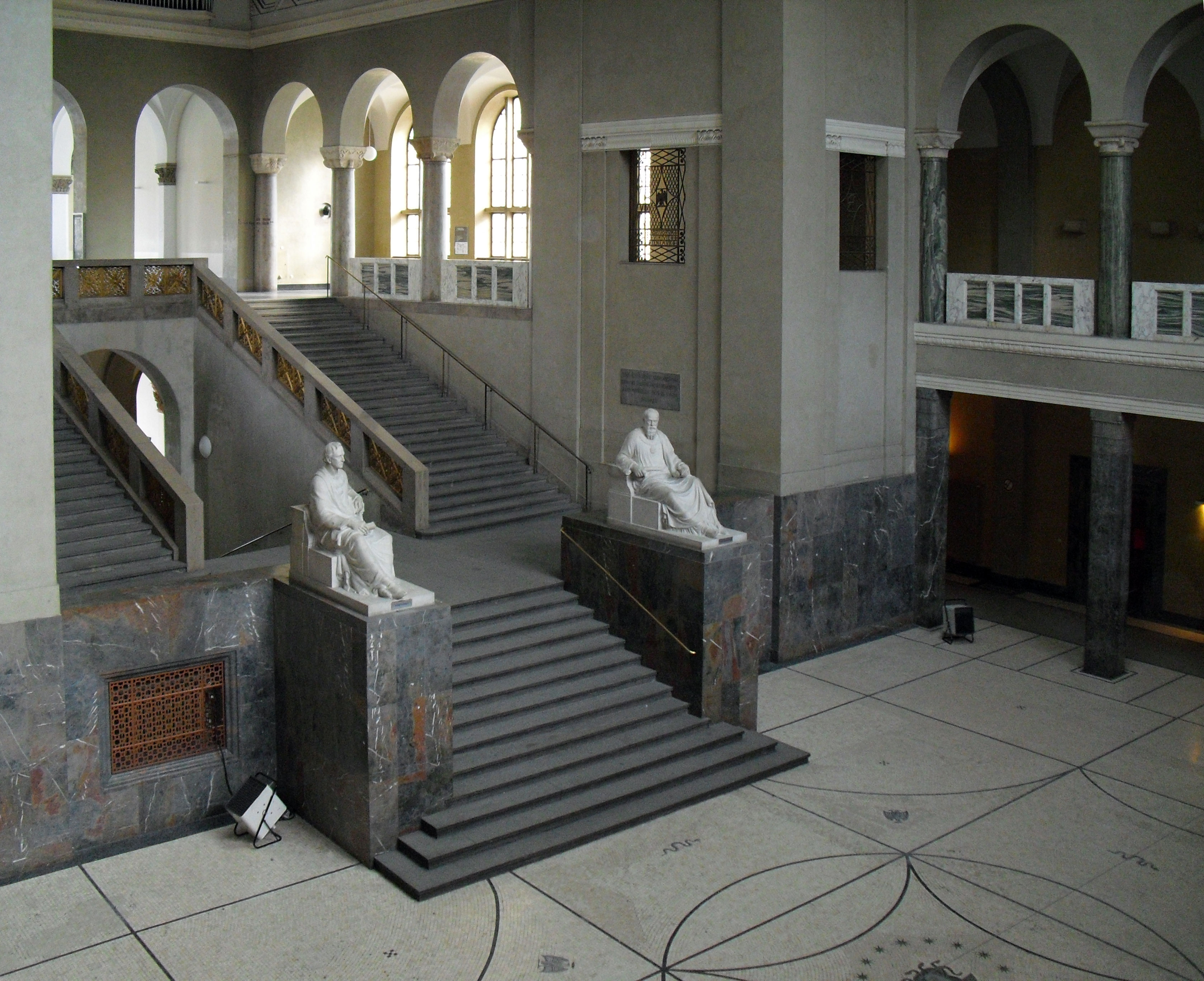
The Lichthof (atrium)

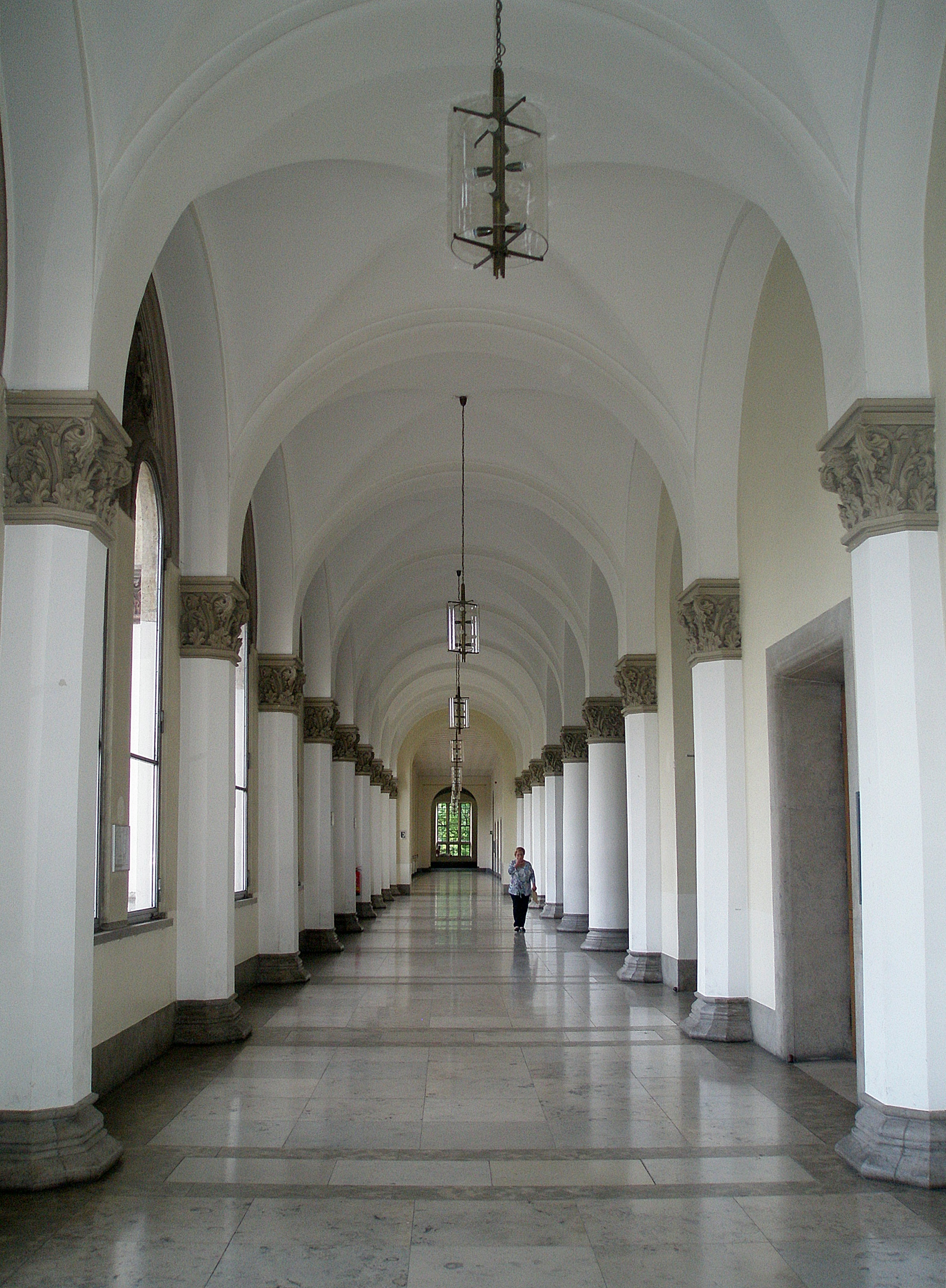
Colonnade in the first floor

The university has continued to be one of the leading universities of West Germany during the Cold War and in the post-reunification era. In the late 1960s, the university was the scene of protests by radical students.

Today, LMU Munich is part of 24 Collaborative Research Centers funded by the German Research Foundation (DFG) and is host university of 13 of them. It also hosts 12 DFG Research Training Groups and three international doctorate programs as part of the Elite Network of Bavaria, an educational policy concept of Bavaria for the promotion of gifted pupils and students in the higher education sector. It attracts an additional 120 million euros per year in outside funding and is intensively involved in national and international funding initiatives.

LMU Munich has a wide range of degree programs, with 150 subjects available in numerous combinations. 15% of the 45,000 students who attend the university come from abroad.

In 2005, Germany's state and federal governments launched the German Universities Excellence Initiative, a contest among its universities. With a total of 1.9 billion euros, 75 percent of which comes from the federal state, its architects aim to strategically promote top-level research and scholarship. The money is given to more than 30 research universities in Germany.

The initiative will fund three project-oriented areas: graduate schools to promote the next generation of scholars, clusters of excellence to promote cutting-edge research, and "future concepts" for the project-based expansion of academic excellence at universities as a whole. In order to qualify for this third area, a university had to have at least one internationally recognized academic center of excellence and a new graduate school. After the first round of selections, LMU Munich was invited to submit applications for all three funding lines. It entered the competition with proposals for two graduate schools and four clusters of excellence.

On Friday 13 October 2006, a blue-ribbon panel announced the results of the Germany-wide Excellence Initiative for promoting top university research and education. The panel, composed of the German Research Foundation and the German Science Council, has decided that LMU Munich will receive funding for all three areas covered by the Initiative: one graduate school, three "excellence clusters" and general funding for the university's "future concept".

In January 2012, scientists at the Ludwig-Maximilians-Universität München published details of the most sensitive listening device known so far. This has led to the college being inducted into the Guinness Book of World Records.

In September 2018, the Munich public prosecutor's office investigated a university vice president on suspicion of embezzlement. The vice president should have claimed "excessive travel expenses". The following year, veterinary students reported that the LMU violated animal welfare standards. According to them, the LMU keeps pigs in tight grid boxes, so that some animals showed scratches, bumps and respiratory diseases from lying down. Students who reported these circumstances said that they were threatened with deregistration from the university. In the beginning of 2020, the LMU locked around 80 students in a room who wanted to discuss the topic "Climate Burns, University Burns," about why universities are doing research for companies that are harmful to the climate.

== Campus ==
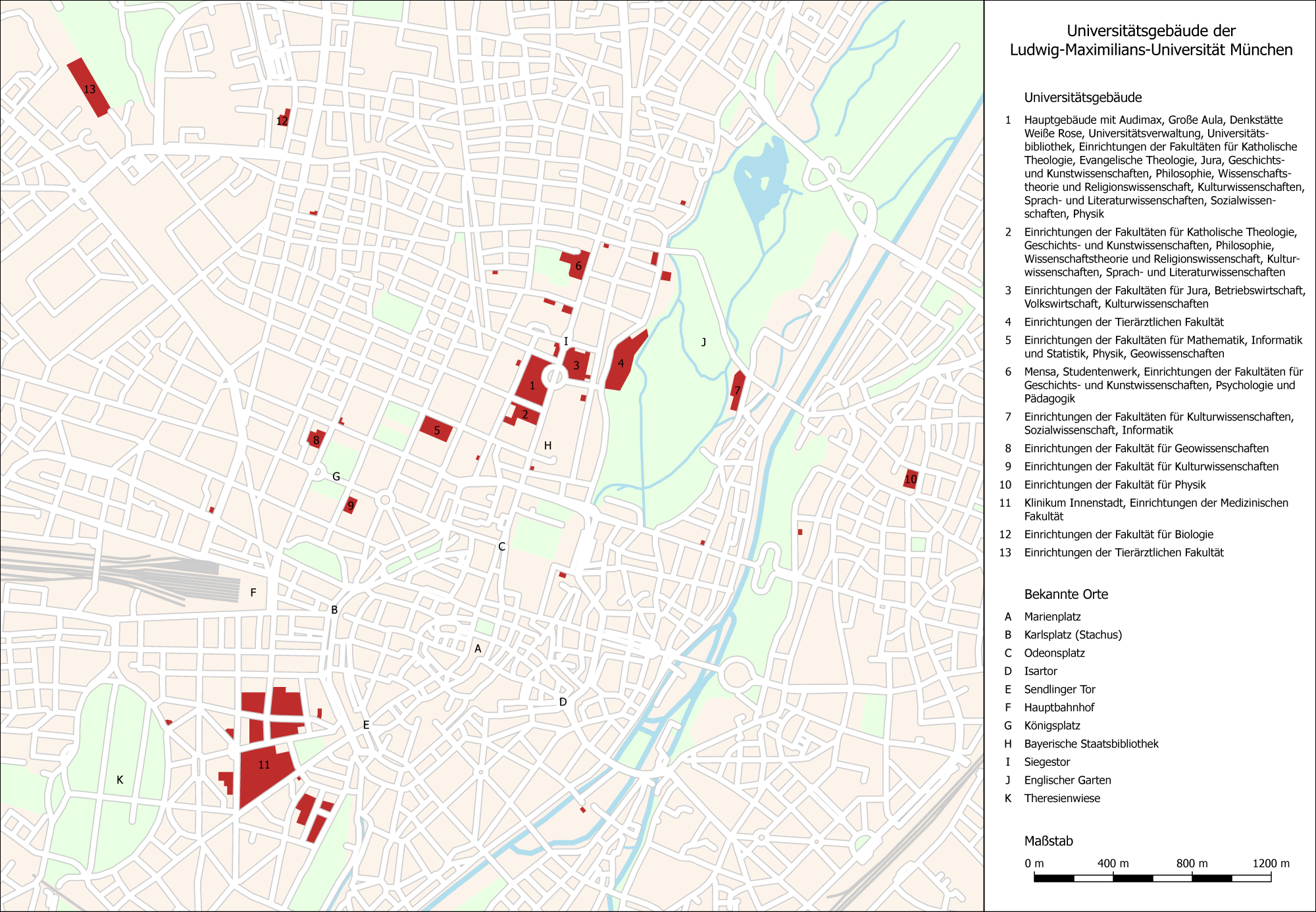
LMU's institutes and research centers are spread throughout Munich.

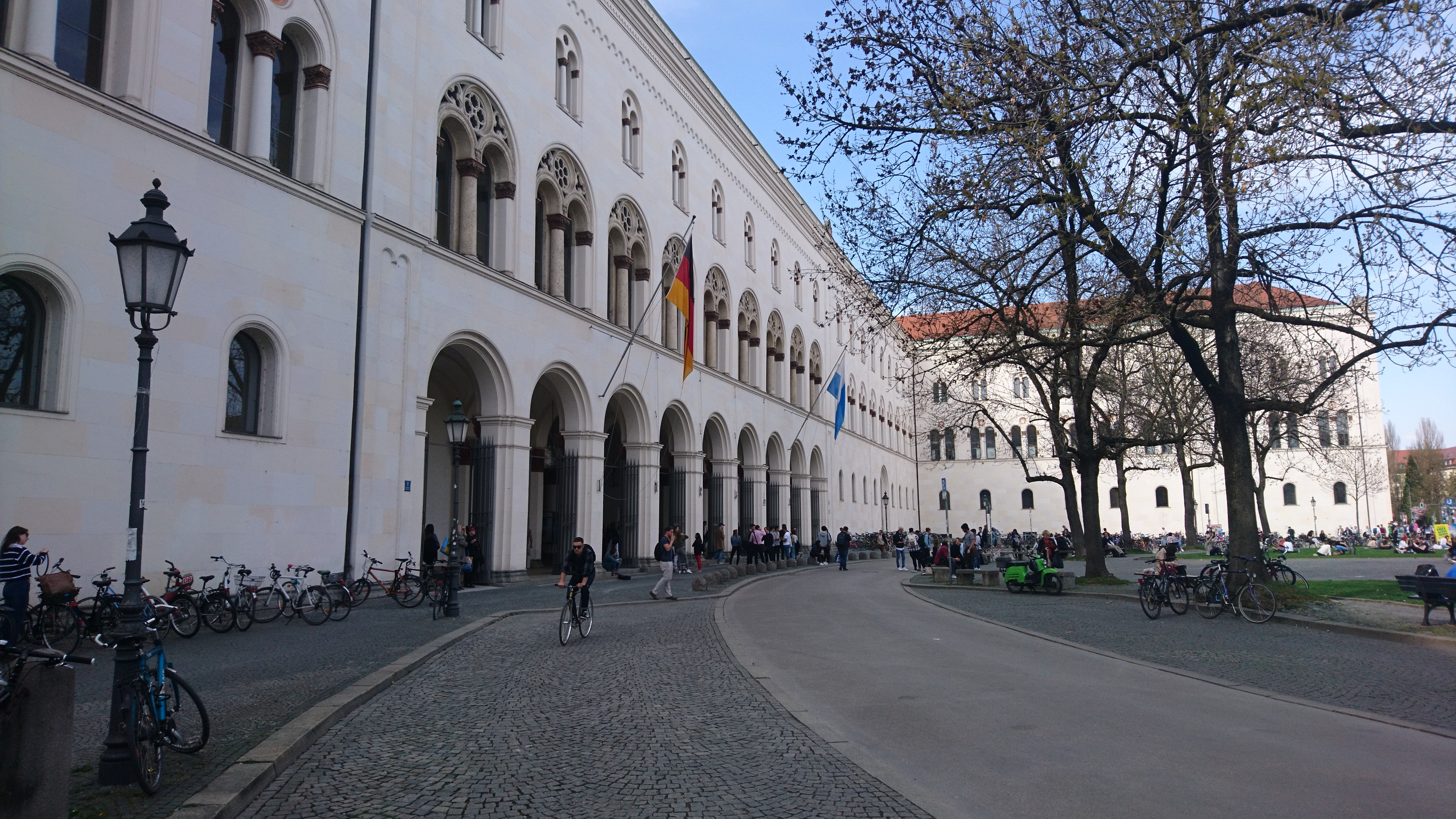
Entrance to LMU's main building

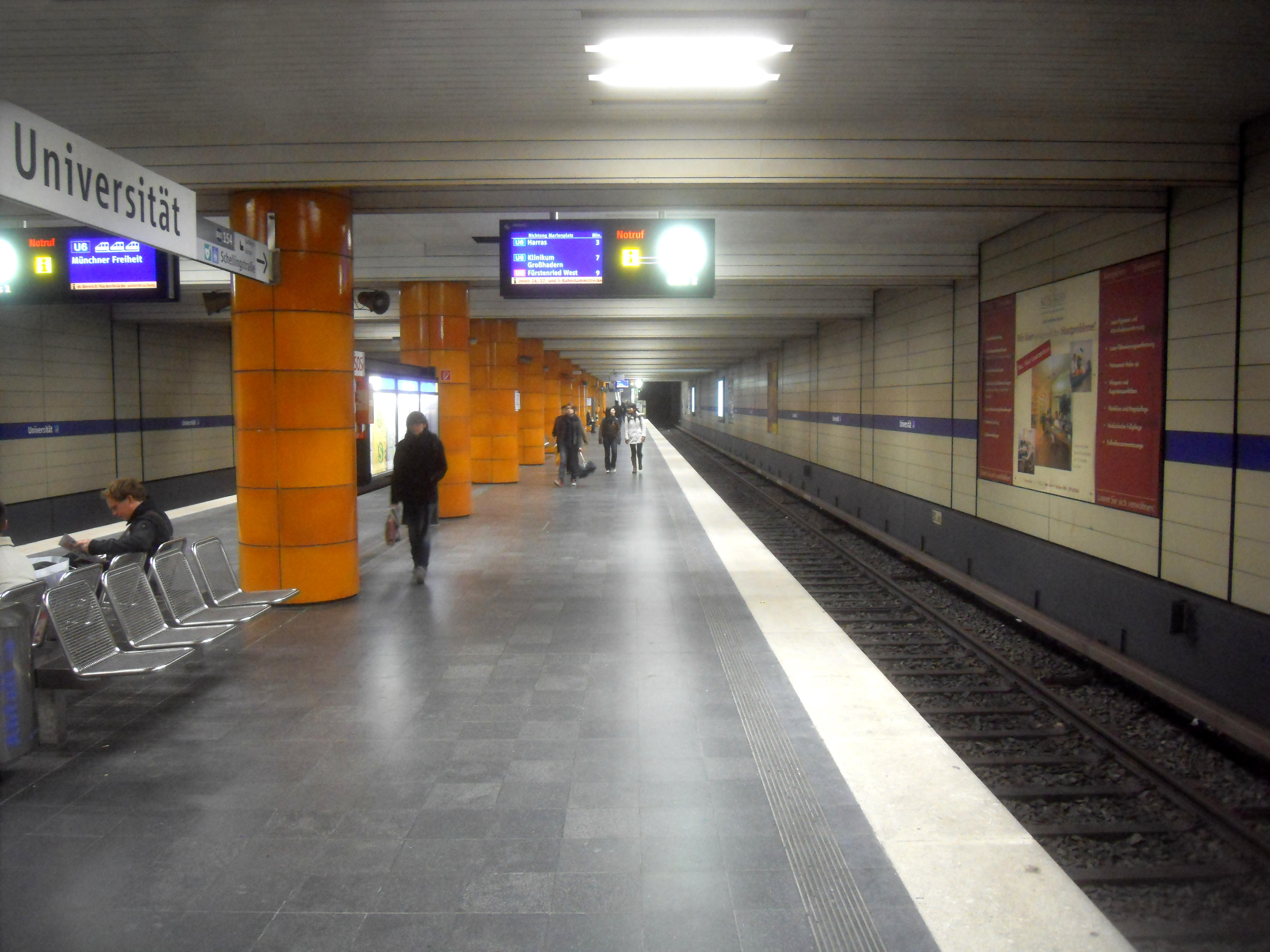
Underground station Universität serves LMU's main campus via lines U3/U6.

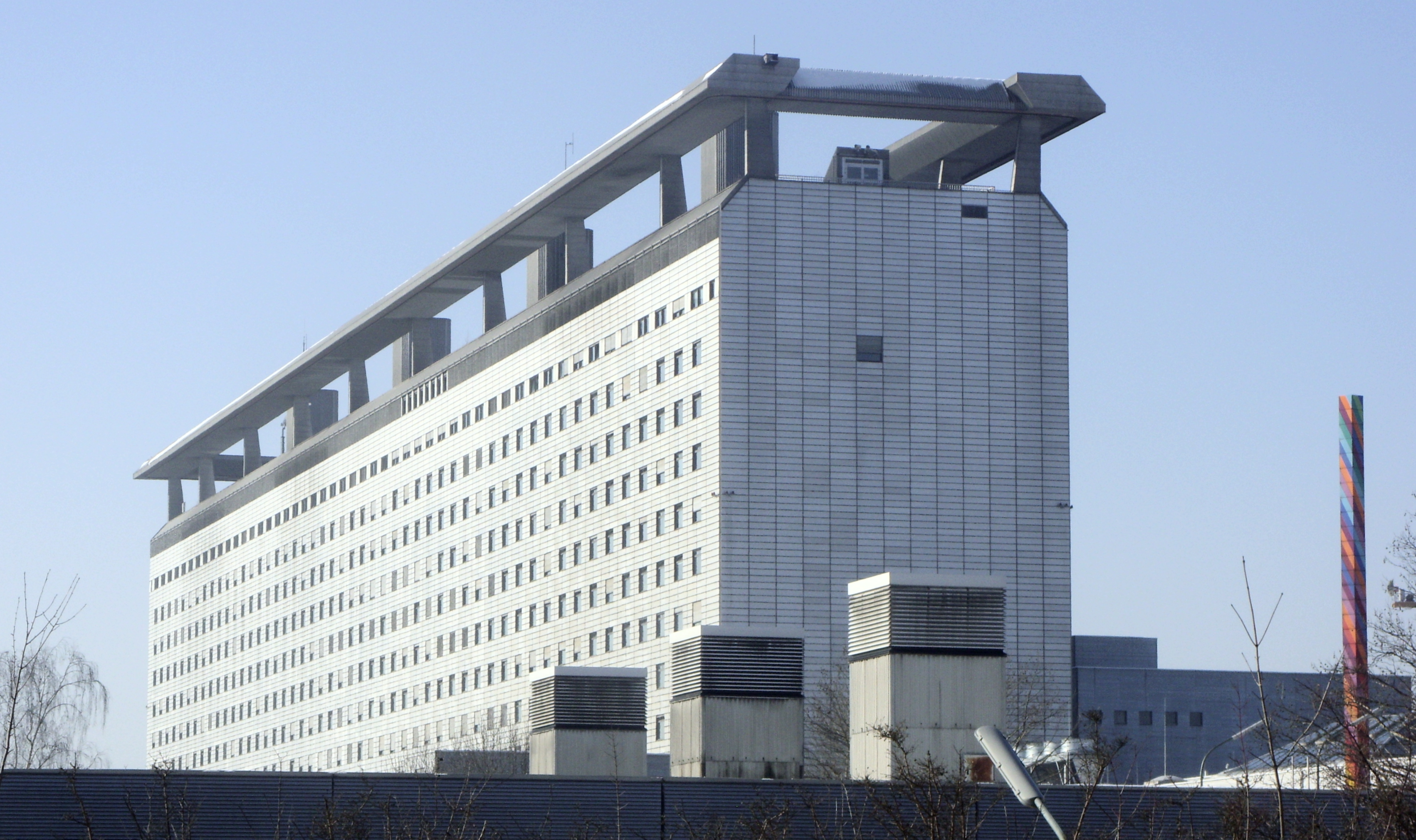
LMU Klinikum – Campus Großhadern, the hospital

LMU's institutes and research centers are spread throughout Munich, with several buildings located in the suburbs of Oberschleissheim and Garching as well as Maisach and Bad Tölz. The university's main buildings are grouped around Geschwister-Scholl-Platz and Professor-Huber-Platz on Ludwigstrasse, extending into side streets such as Akademiestraße, Schellingstraße, and Veterinärstraße. Other large campuses and institutes are located in Großhadern (Klinikum Großhadern), Martinsried (chemistry and biotechnology campus), the Ludwigsvorstadt (Klinikum Innenstadt) and in the Lehel (Institut am Englischen Garten), across from the main buildings, through the Englischer Garten.

The university's main building is situated in Geschwister-Scholl-Platz and the university's main campus is served by the Munich subway's Universität station.

=== Great Assembly Hall (Große Aula) ===
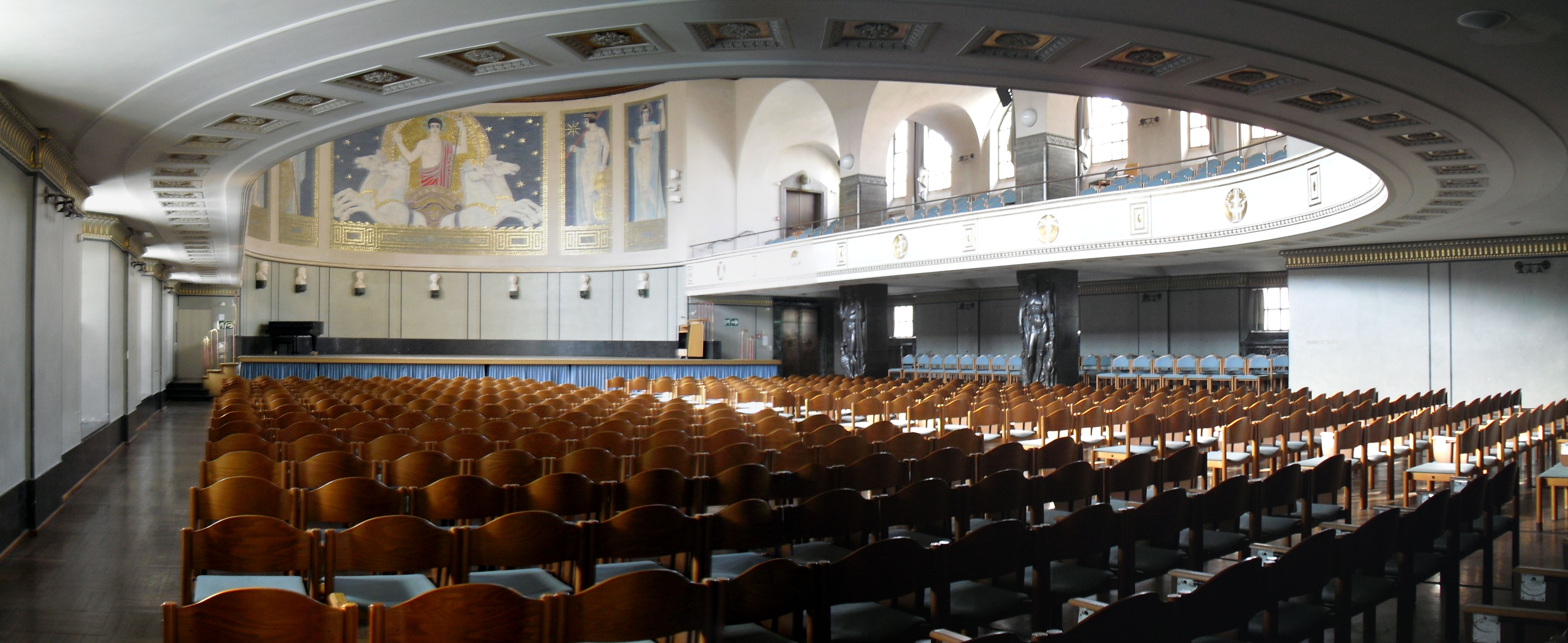
Große Aula

The Große Aula is located in the university main building at Ludwigstraße in Munich. The Aula was constructed as part of the main building by Friedrich von Gärtner and completed in 1840. The hall is situated in the first floor and extends to the second floor.

The Aula was not destroyed during World War II and, thus, is one of few usable pre war venues in Munich. The Aula was used for the first performances of concerts after the war. Furthermore, it was venue for the constituent assembly of the state of Bavaria, where the current Bavarian constitution was enacted.

Today, the Aula hosts mainly concerts, talks and lectures.

== Academics ==
=== Fields of study ===
Despite the Bologna Process which saw the demise of most traditional academic-degree courses such as the Diplom and Magister Artium in favor of the more internationally known Bachelors and Masters system, LMU Munich continues to offer more than 100 areas of study with numerous combinations of majors and minors.

In line with the university's internationalization as a popular destination for tertiary studies, an increasing number of courses mainly at the graduate and postgraduate levels are also available in English to cater to international students who may have little or no background in the German language. Notable subject areas which currently offer programs in English include various fields such as STEM and business management.

=== Faculties ===
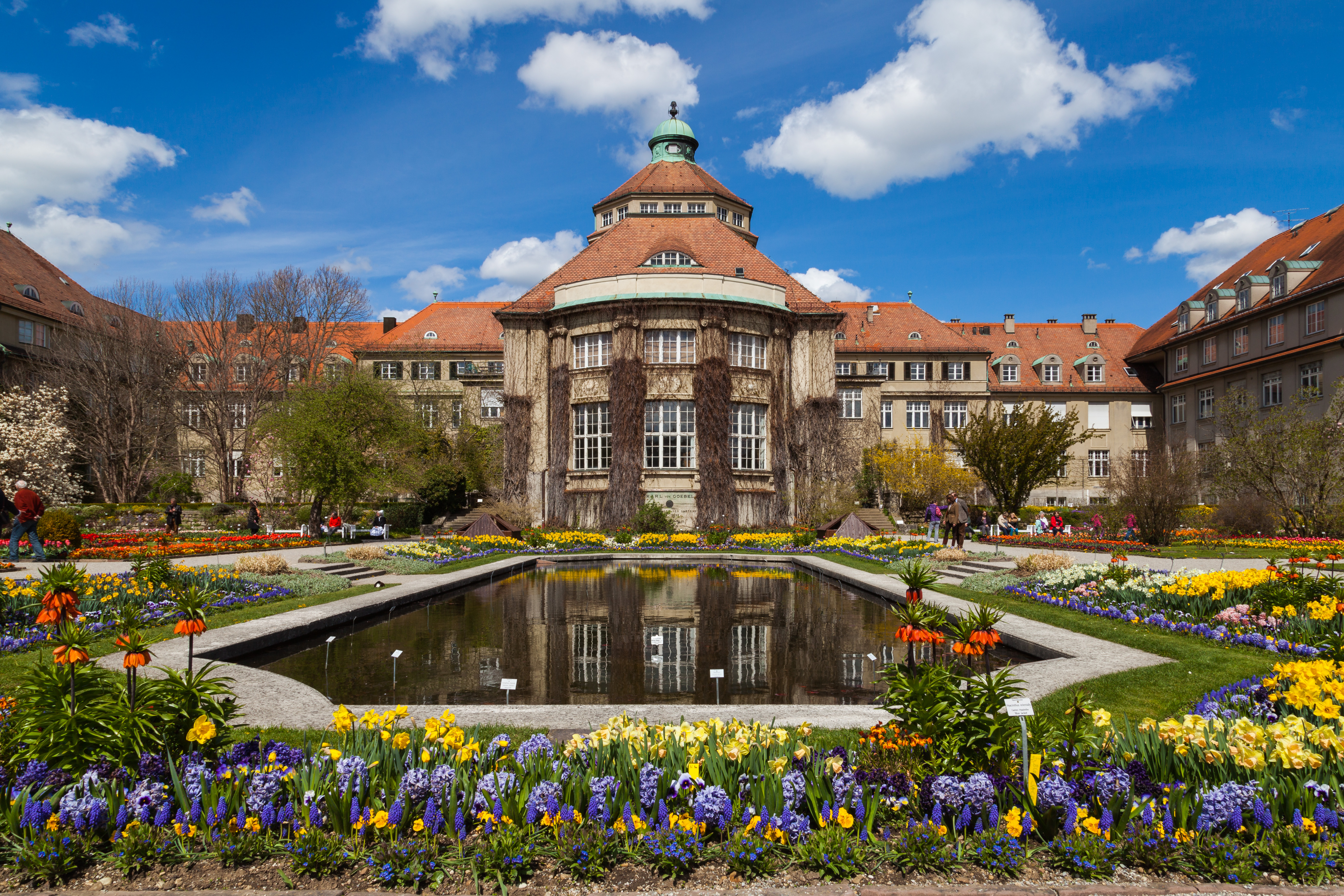
LMU's Institute of Systematic Botany is located at Botanischer Garten München-Nymphenburg.

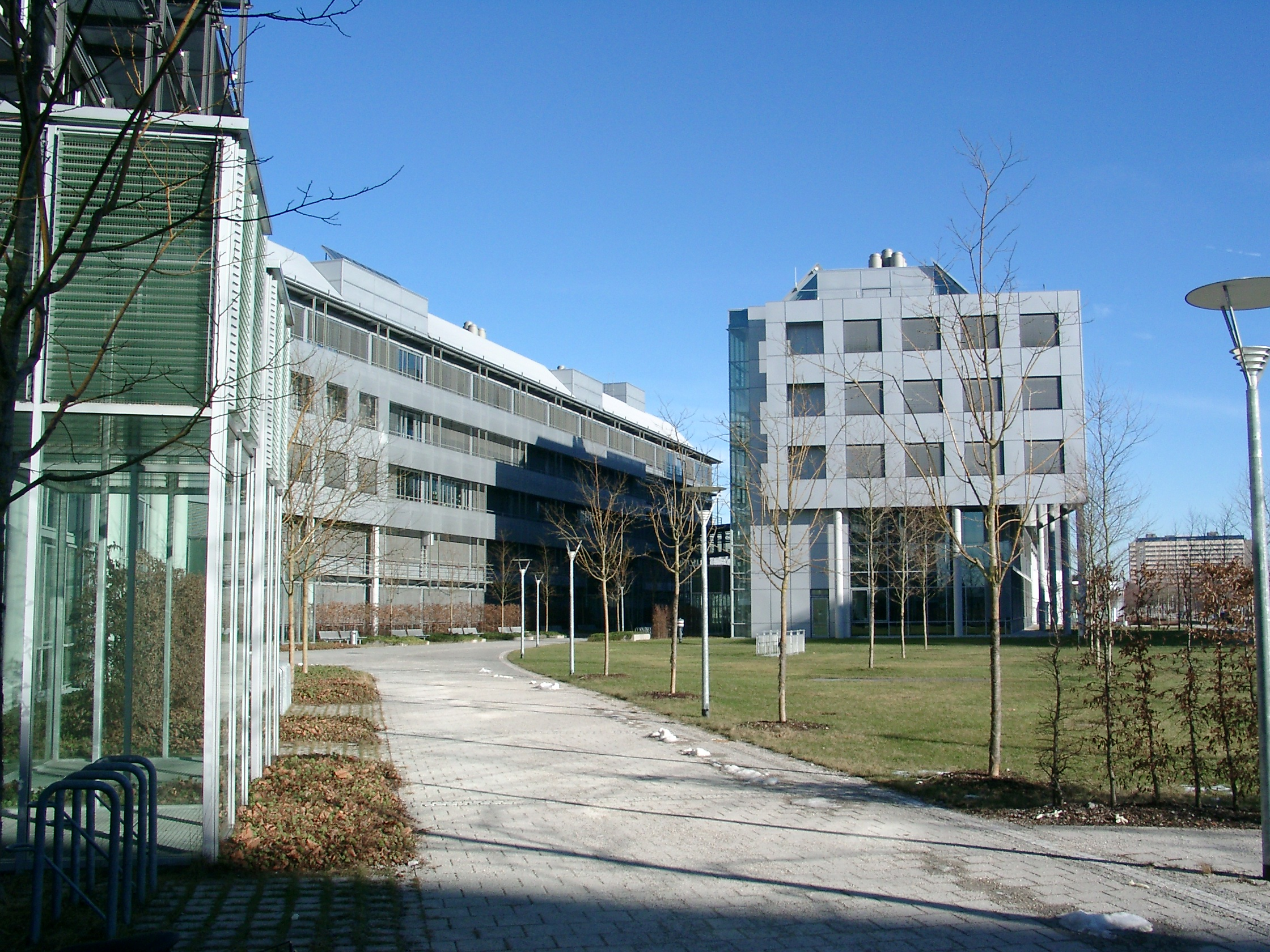
Faculty of chemistry buildings at the Martinsried campus of LMU Munich

The university consists of 18 faculties which oversee various departments and institutes. The official numbering of the faculties and the missing numbers 06 and 14 are the result of breakups and mergers of faculties in the past. The Faculty of Forestry Operations with number 06 has been integrated into the Technical University of Munich in 1999 and faculty number 14 has been merged with faculty number 13.

- 01 Faculty of Catholic Theology
- 02 Faculty of Protestant Theology
- 03 Faculty of Law
- 04 Faculty of Business Administration
- 05 Faculty of Economics
- 07 Faculty of Medicine
- 08 Faculty of Veterinary Medicine
- 09 Faculty for History and the Arts
- 10 Faculty of Philosophy, Philosophy of Science and Study of Religion
- 11 Faculty of Psychology and Educational Sciences
- 12 Faculty for the Study of Culture
- 13 Faculty for Languages and Literatures
- 15 Faculty of Social Sciences
- 16 Faculty of Mathematics, Computer Science and Statistics
- 17 Faculty of Physics
- 18 Faculty of Chemistry and Pharmacy
- 19 Faculty of Biology
- 20 Faculty of Geosciences and Environmental Sciences

=== Research centers and facilities ===
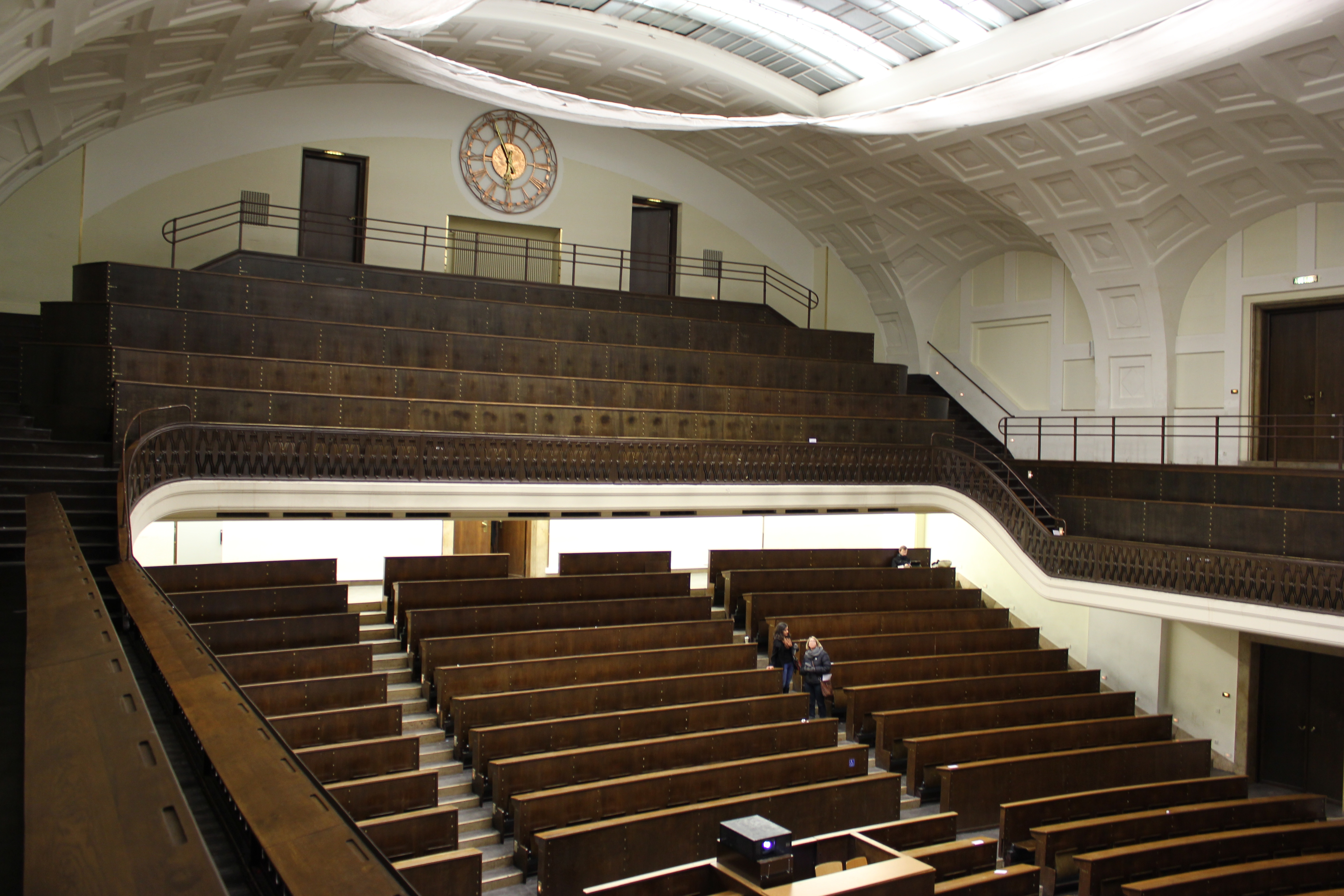
Audimax

In addition to its 18 faculties, LMU Munich also maintains numerous research centers involved in numerous cross-faculty and transdisciplinary projects to complement its various academic programs. Some were a result of cooperation between LMU and external partners from academia and industry; the Rachel Carson Center for Environment and Society, for example, was established through a joint initiative between LMU Munich and the Deutsches Museum, while the Parmenides Center for the Study of Thinking resulted from the collaboration between the Parmenides Foundation and LMU Munich's Human Science Center.

Some research facilities which have been established include:

- Center for Advanced Studies (CAS)
- Munich Arts Research Center (MARC)
- Munich Center for Mathematical Philosophy (MCMP)
- Munich Center on Governance, Communication, Public Policy and Law (MCG)
- Munich International Stone Center for Inequality Research (ISI)
- The Munich School of Ancient Philosophy (MUSAΦ)
- Center for Integrated Protein Science Munich (CIPSM)
- Graduate School of Systemic Neurosciences (GSN)
- Helmholtz Zentrum München – German Research Center for Environmental Health
- Nanosystems Initiative Munich (NIM)
- Parmenides Center for the Study of Thinking
- Rachel Carson Center for Environment and Society

=== Tuition and fees ===
Universities in Bavaria do not charge tuition fees. Instead, a mandatory semester fee has to be paid that is fully transferred to the student union for providing, amongst other services, housing and lunch options for students.

=== Partnerships ===
LMU maintains 20 extensive university cooperations and over 150 partnerships, which contribute to a total of more than 600 cooperation agreements with partner universities worldwide. Alongside the LMUexchange and the Erasmus+ mobility network, global partners include, but are not limited to:

- University of Cambridge
- Harvard University
- National Taiwan University
- New York University
- Stellenbosch University
- University of California, Berkeley

LMU is also a regular participant in the EU projects through the European Universities Initiative programs.

=== Rankings ===
University rankings

Overall – Global & National
QS World 2026	▲58	2
THE World 2026	▲34	2
ARWU World 2025	▲42	1

The 2026 QS World University Rankings rank LMU Munich 58th overall in the world and 2nd in Germany. In the 2024 QS Subject Rankings, the university is highly ranked in the arts and humanities, natural sciences, life sciences, medicine, and social sciences, with particular strengths in theology, divinity, and religious studies, philosophy, and communication and media studies.

The Times Higher Education Ranking 2024 ranks LMU Munich 2nd in Germany, and 38th in the world. In the 2023 THE subject rankings, LMU is ranked first in Germany in the arts and humanities, law, and psychology.

The Academic Ranking of World Universities ranks LMU Munich 1st nationally and 42nd in the world as of 2025. In the subjects of physics, education, communication, public administration, and hospitality, it is ranked first in Germany.

In 2018 and 2019, the LMU took 1st place based on the number of DAX board of management members. The top 3 universities in 2019 were the LMU Munich, the RWTH Aachen and the Technische Universität Darmstadt. According to the funding report of the German Research Foundation (DFG) of 2021, which breaks down the grants from 2017 to 2019, LMU Munich ranked 1st among German universities. By area, it ranked 1st in the life sciences, 2nd in the humanities and social sciences, and 6th in the natural sciences. In November 2018 Expertscape recognized it as one of the top ten institutions in the world in pancreatic cancer.

QS World University Rankings by Subject 2024
Subject	Global	National
Arts & Humanities	▲ =38	▲2
Linguistics	▲ =65	▲2–3
Theology, Divinity and Religious Studies	▲24	▲4
Archeology	▼ =36	5
Classics and Ancient History	▼8	▼3
English Language and Literature	▼59	3
History	27	▼2
Modern Languages	▲45	3
Philosophy	▲6	1
Engineering and Technology	▲ =216	▲8
Computer Science and Information Systems	▲90	▲3
Life Sciences & Medicine	▲ =46	2
Anatomy and Physiology	▲37	1
Biological Sciences	▼26	1
Dentistry	51–100	1–4
Medicine	▲ =38	2
Pharmacy and Pharmacology	▲55	2
Psychology	▲ =47	▲1
Veterinary Science	▼39	1
Natural Sciences	▼ =42	▲2
Chemistry	▲ =48	▼3
Earth and Marine Sciences	51–100	▲1–7
Environmental Sciences	151–200	▼7–11
Geography	101–150	▲3–6
Geology	51–100	▲1–6
Geophysics	51–100	1–7
Materials Sciences	101–150	7–8
Mathematics	▲ =114	▲5
Physics and Astronomy	▼ =32	▼3
Social Sciences & Management	▲ =93	2
Accounting and Finance	92	2
Anthropology	51–100	▲2–5
Business and Management Studies	151–200	4
Communication and Media Studies	▼23	1
Economics and Econometrics	▼41	1
Education and Training	101–150	2–4
Law and Legal Studies	▲ =43	▲1
Politics	51–100	2–4
Social Policy and Administration	101–130	▼4
Sociology	▼ =77	3
Statistics and Operational Research	51–100	▼3–5

THE World University Rankings by Subject 2024
Subject	Global	National
Arts & humanities	▼15	1
Business & economics	▲36	▲2
Clinical & health	▼50	3
Computer science	▲62	4
Education	▲61	3
Law	▲25	1
Life sciences	▼41	▼3
Physical sciences	▲27	2
Psychology	▼23	1
Social sciences	▲ =61	4

ARWU Global Ranking of Academic Subjects 2023
Subject	Global	National
Natural Sciences
Mathematics	▲101–150	▲6–9
Physics	▼36	1
Chemistry	101–150	▲5–9
Earth Sciences	▲76–100	▲3–4
Geography	201–300	▲10–15
Ecology	▼201–300	▼17–27
Atmospheric Science	101–150	▲6–9
Engineering
Electrical & Electronic Engineering	▼401–500	▼12–16
Biomedical Engineering	▼151–200	6–10
Computer Science & Engineering	▼301–400	▼8–10
Materials Science & Engineering	151–200	6–7
Nanoscience & Nanotechnology	101–150	3–5
Environmental Science & Engineering	301–400	▼13–18
Biotechnology	▼201–300	▼10–16
Remote Sensing	76–100	3
Life Sciences
Biological Sciences	▼51–75	▼4
Human Biological Sciences	41	▲3
Agricultural Sciences	▼401–500	▼20–22
Veterinary Sciences	▼76–100	▲3–4
Medical Sciences
Clinical Medicine	76–100	▲4
Public Health	▼101–150	▼4
Dentistry & Oral Sciences	101–150	8–14
Medical Technology	▲16	3
Pharmacy & Pharmaceutical Sciences	▲51–75	▲5–8
Social Sciences
Economics	▲51–75	2
Statistics	▲101–150	▲2–6
Law	201–300	3–6
Political Sciences	51–75	3–4
Sociology	▲76–100	4–5
Education	▲51–75	▲1
Communication	16	1
Psychology	51–75	1–4
Business Administration	▲201–300	▲4–8
Management	▼201–300	▼3–7
Public Administration	▲26	1
Hospitality & Tourism Management	151–200	1

=== One Munich Strategy Forum ===
The LMU and the Technical University of Munich have come together to work on "One Munich Strategy Forum", with a €2.5 million fund from the state of Bavaria.

=== Munich International Summer University ===
The Munich International Summer University (MISU at LMU) is the Summer University by LMU, which takes place annually in Munich and depending on the course also involves stays at different European cities. MISU invites international students to attend short-term programs at the LMU Munich in order to progress academically even in winter or summer breaks at their home university. MISU hereby offers two course formats: On the one hand German Language classes are held at different times over the year. On the other hand, MISU offers 16 subject-specific Summer Schools and Winter Schools covering a wide range of academic fields. Around 1000 students from nearly 90 countries joined MISU short-term programs in 2019.

Germany has a long tradition of hosting summer programs for international students. LMU organized its Summer University for the first time in 1927. Labeled as Sommerkurse für Ausländer (Summer Courses for Foreigners) the Summer University ran annually until 1934 and primarily consisted of German Language courses for international students. After a longer intermittence period, LMU's Summer University resumed as Internationaler Münchner Sommer (International Summer in Munich). Since then the number of courses has increased and the range of subject-specific Summer Schools was extended to further academic disciplines. From 2008 onwards LMU's Summer University operates under the name Munich International Summer University (MISU).

A central aim of MISU is to boost the internationality of the LMU Munich in terms of research and teaching. Compared to semester-based student exchange programs, short-term programs such as Summer Schools have the advantage for international students to receive a very intensive and concise insight into the research areas and campus at the LMU Munich. MISU hereby has the objective to combine excellent academic education with extra-curricular activities. Participants are thus not only supervised intensively by established researchers on selected topics but are also introduced to the history, culture and politics of Munich, Bavaria and Germany. Moreover, the Summer University allows the LMU Munich to intensify cooperation with international partner universities. MISU's short-term programs therefore strengthen the LMU's international visibility as one of the highest ranked universities in Europe.

== Notable alumni and faculty members ==
The alumni of Ludwig-Maximilians-Universität München played a major role in the development of quantum mechanics. Max Planck, the founder of quantum theory and Nobel laureate in Physics in 1918, was an alumnus of the university. Founders of quantum mechanics such as Werner Heisenberg, Wolfgang Pauli, and others were associated with the university. Most recently, to honor the Nobel laureate in Chemistry Gerhard Ertl, who worked as a professor at LMU Munich from 1973 to 1986, the building of the Physical Chemistry was named after him.

Pakistani philosopher and poet Sir Muhammad Iqbal, regarded as the "Poet of the East" and "The Thinker of Pakistan", earned his PhD degree from the Ludwig-Maximilians-Universität München, Munich in 1908. Working under the guidance of Friedrich Hommel, Iqbal published his doctoral thesis in 1908, entitled The Development of Metaphysics in Persia.

The anti-Nazi resistance White Rose was based in this university.

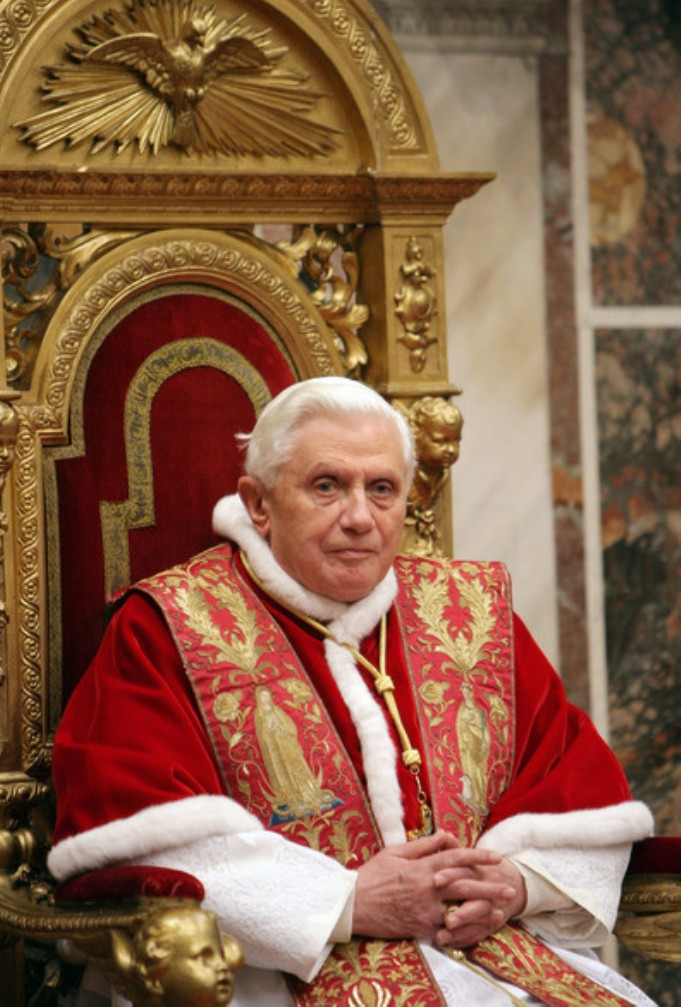
Pope Benedict XVI was a student and professor at LMU Munich.

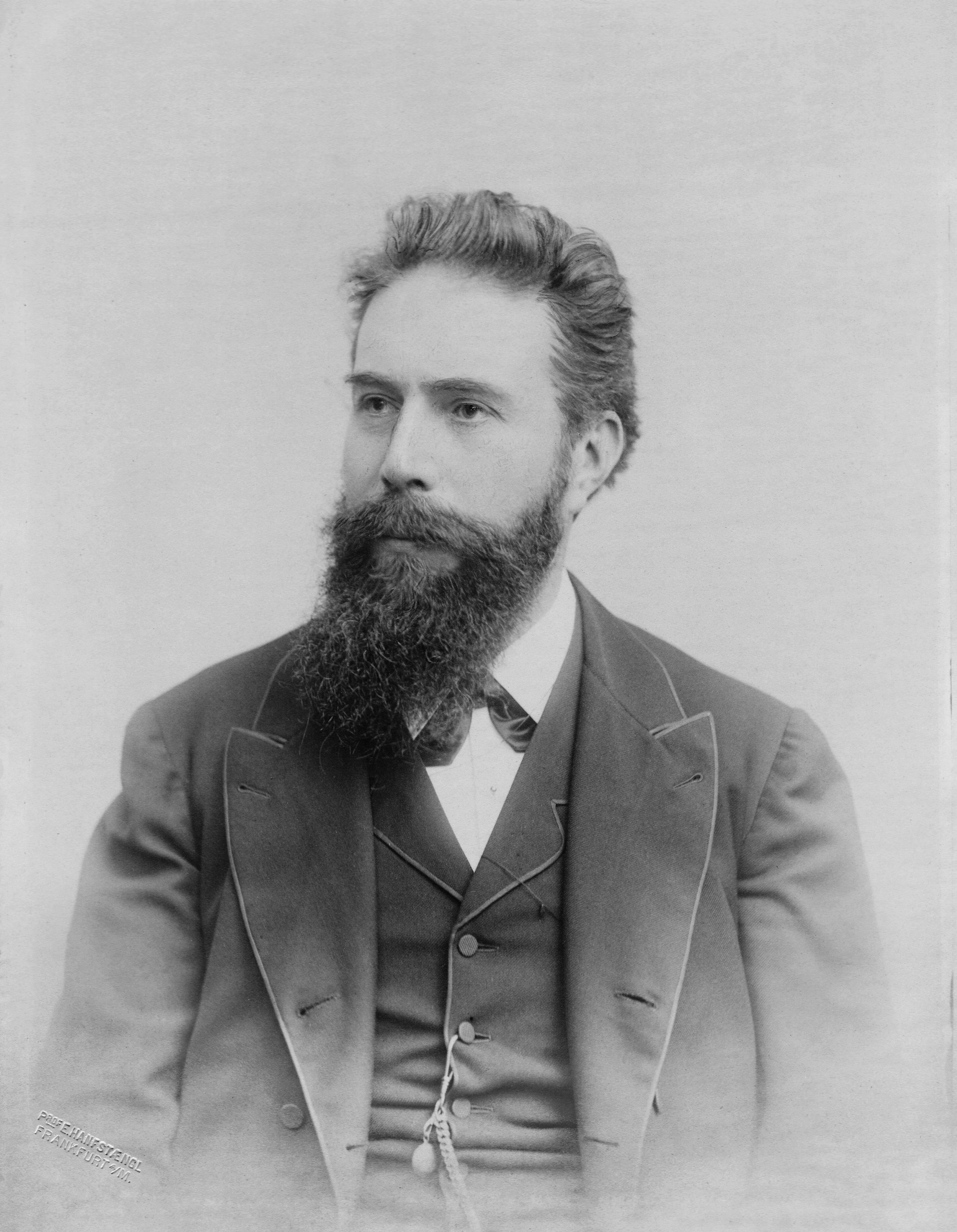
Wilhelm Conrad Röntgen received the Nobel Prize in Physics in 1901.

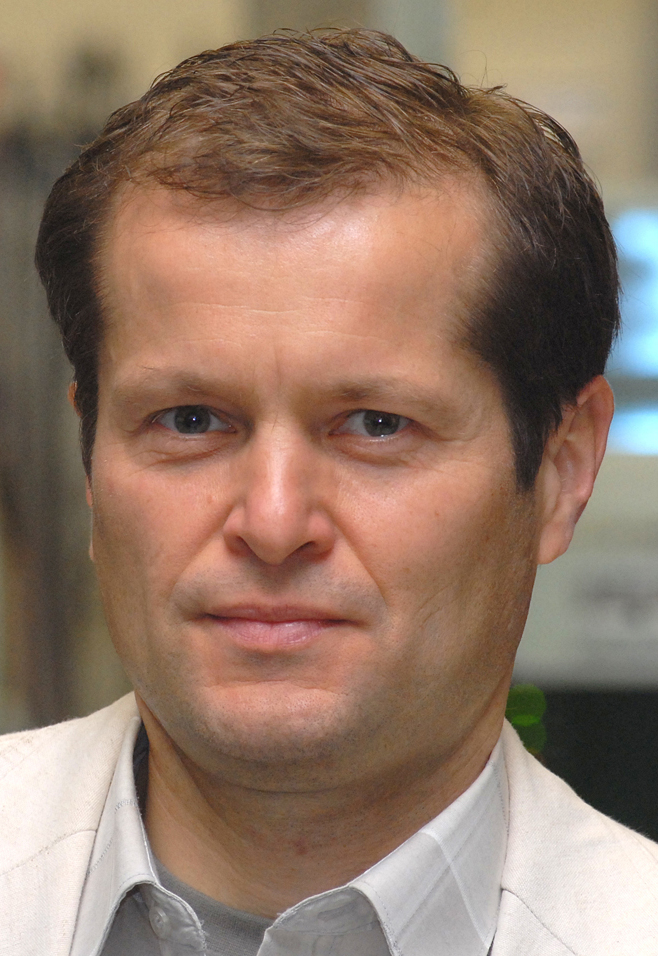
Ferenc Krausz received the Nobel Prize in Physics in 2023.

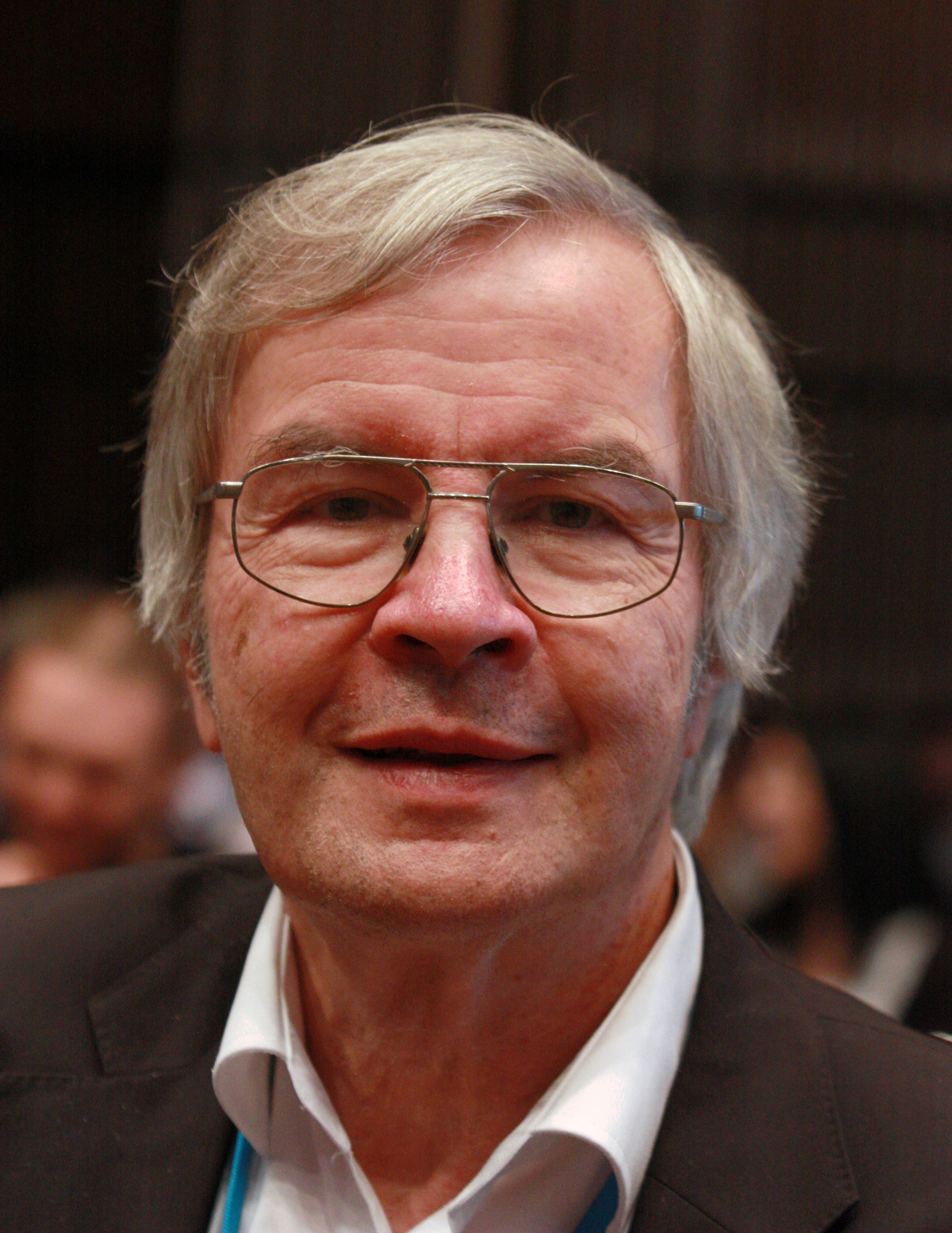
Theodor W. Hänsch received the Nobel Prize in Physics in 2005.

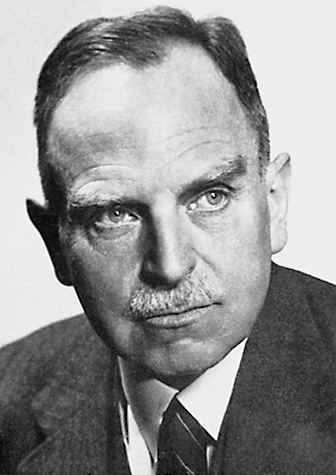
Otto Hahn received the Nobel Prize in Chemistry in 1944.

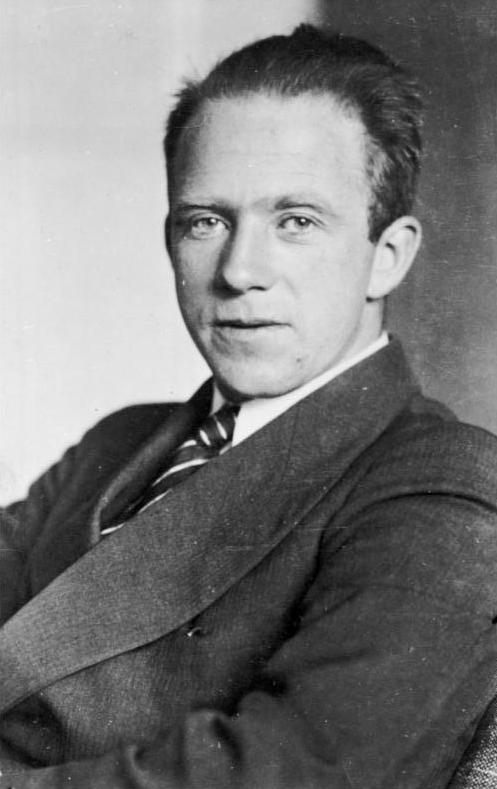
Werner Heisenberg received the Nobel Prize in Physics in 1932.

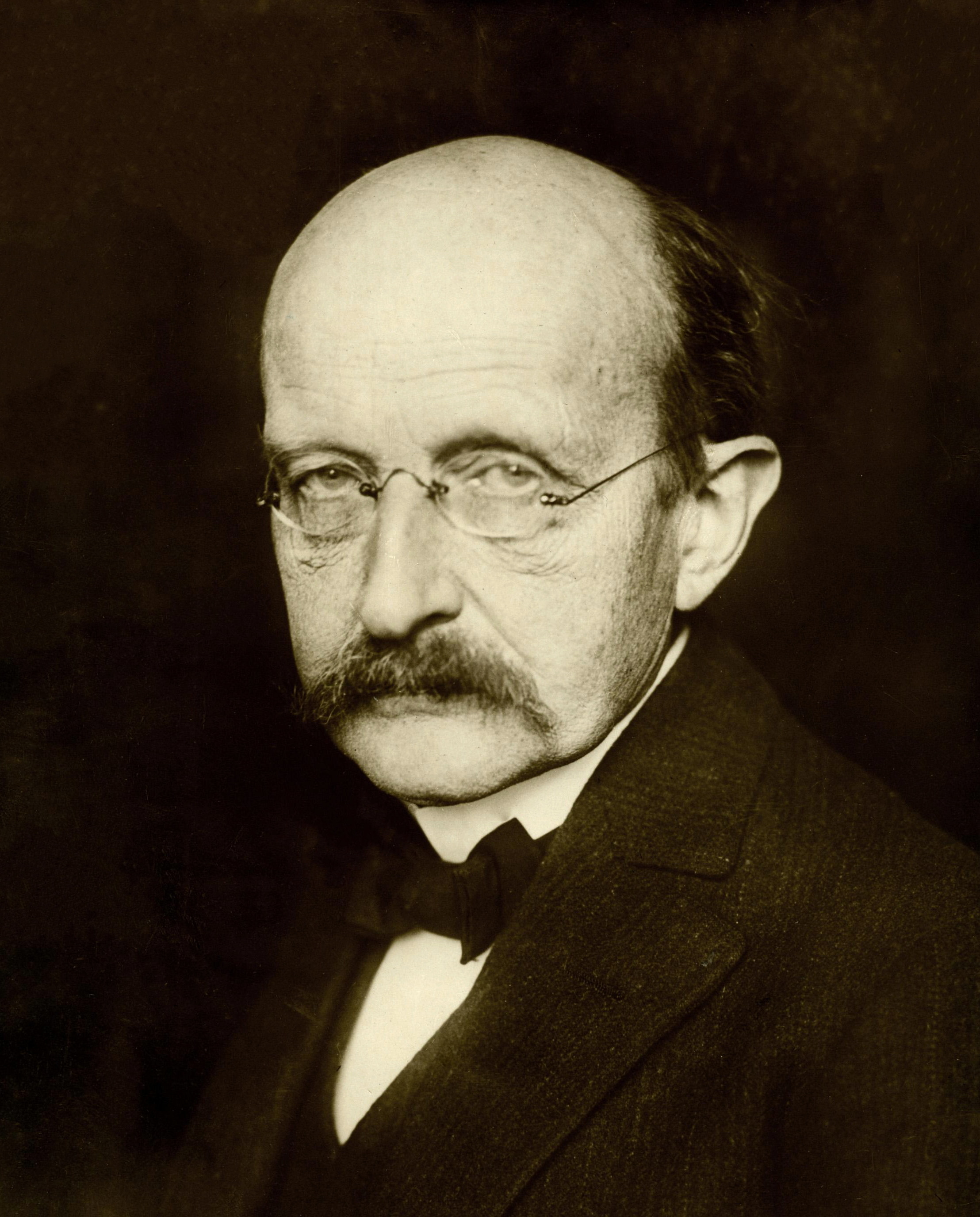
Max Planck received the Nobel Prize in Physics in 1918.

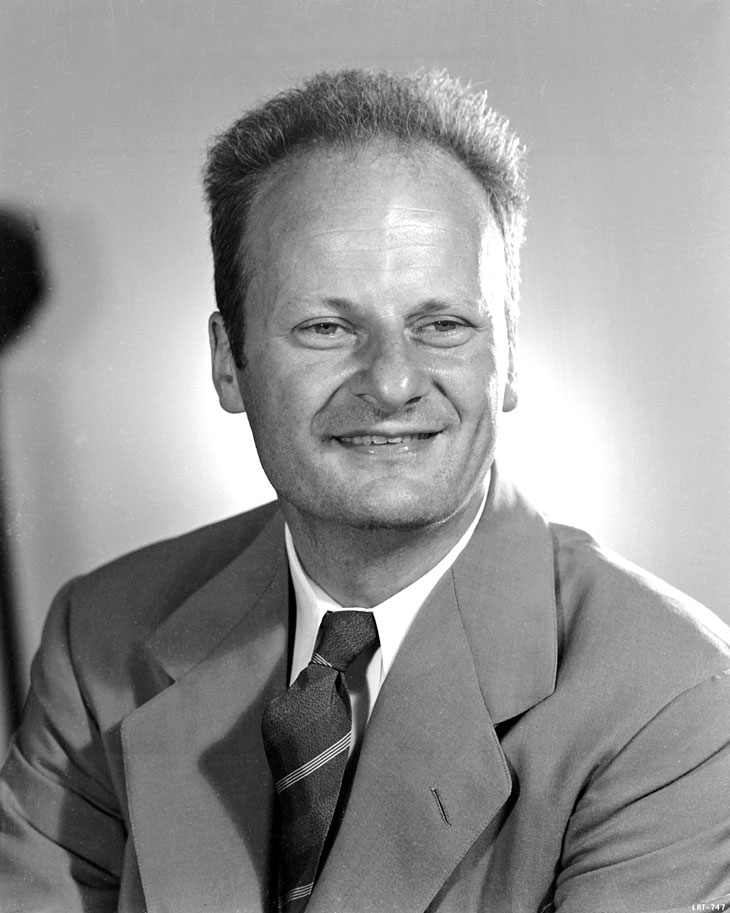
Hans Bethe received the 1967 Nobel Prize in Physics.

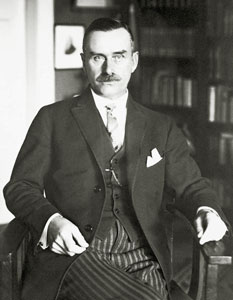
Nobel Prize-winning novelist Thomas Mann gave numerous lectures at LMU Munich.

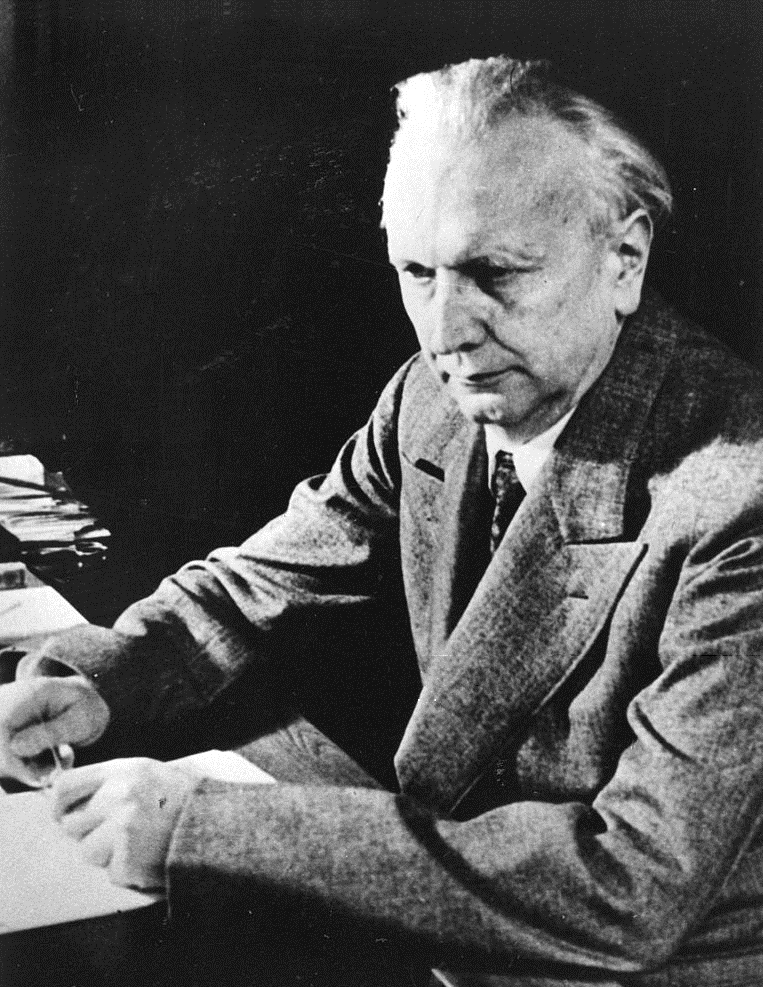
Karl Jaspers was a German-Swiss psychiatrist and philosopher.

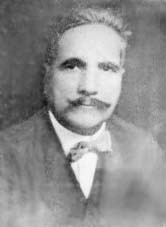
Philosopher, Persian and Urdu poet Sir Muhammad Iqbal studied philosophy at LMU Munich.

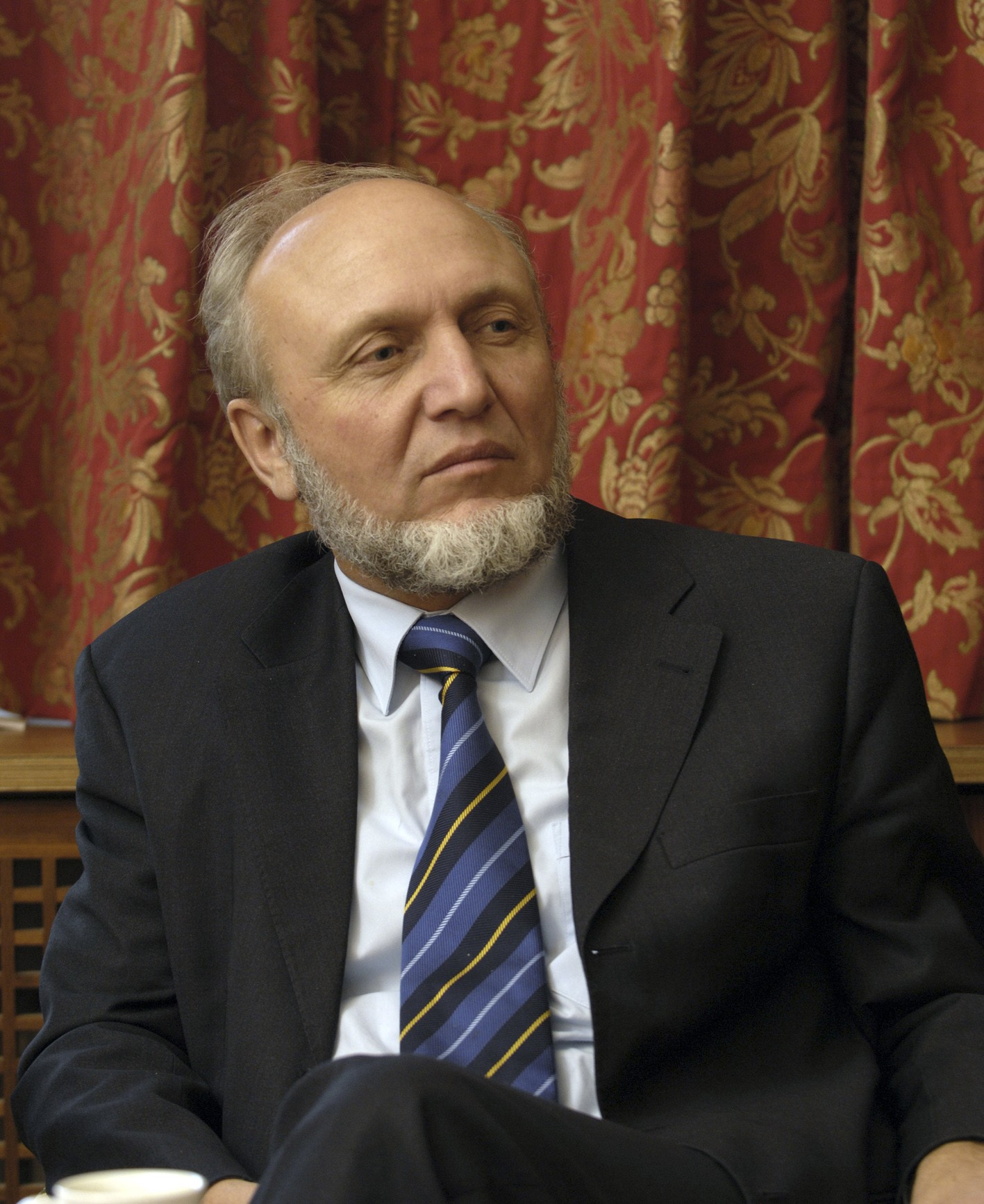
Hans-Werner Sinn, professor of economics at LMU Munich

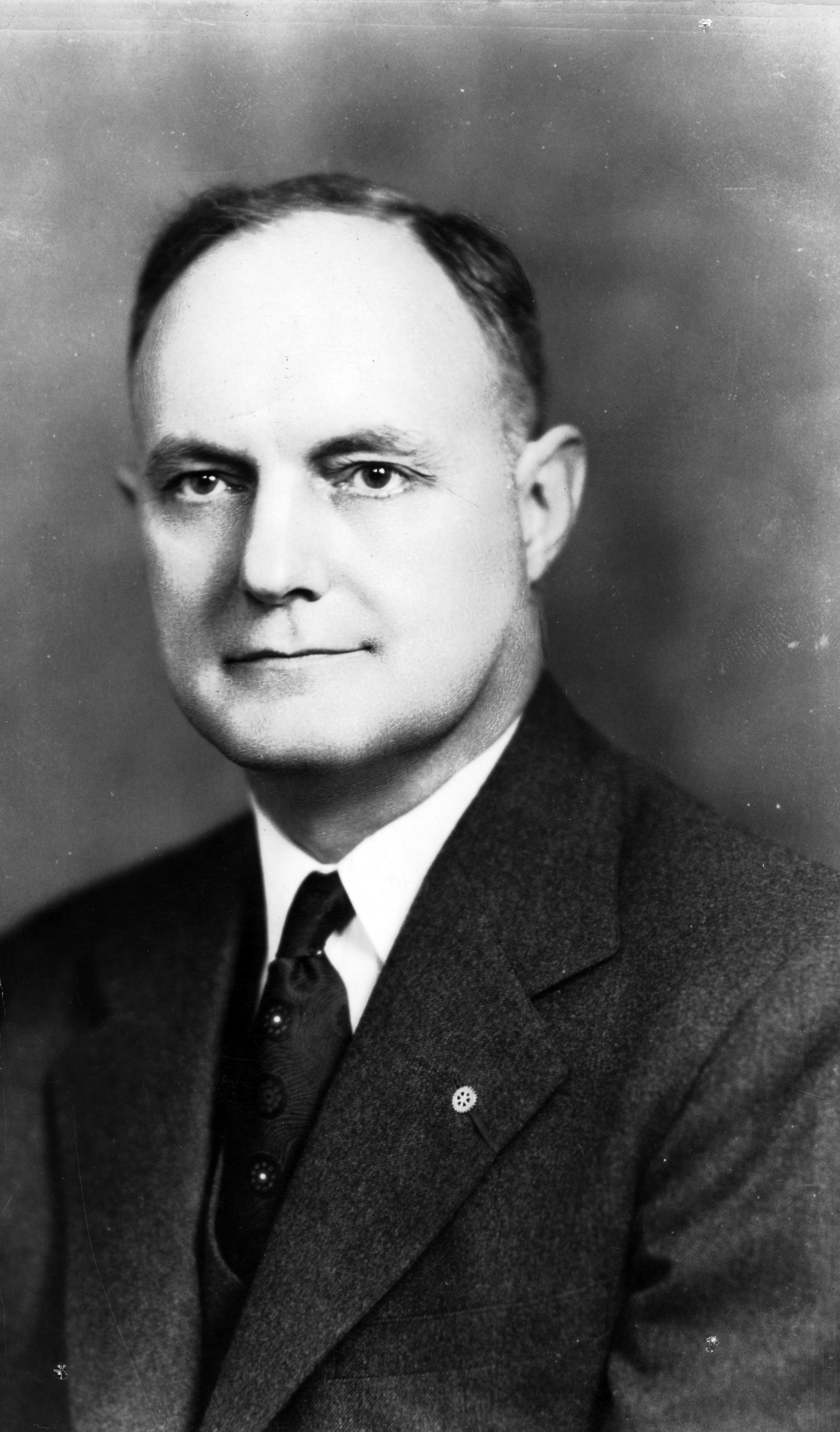
Blake Ragsdale Van Leer, United States Army officer and president of Georgia Institute of Technology

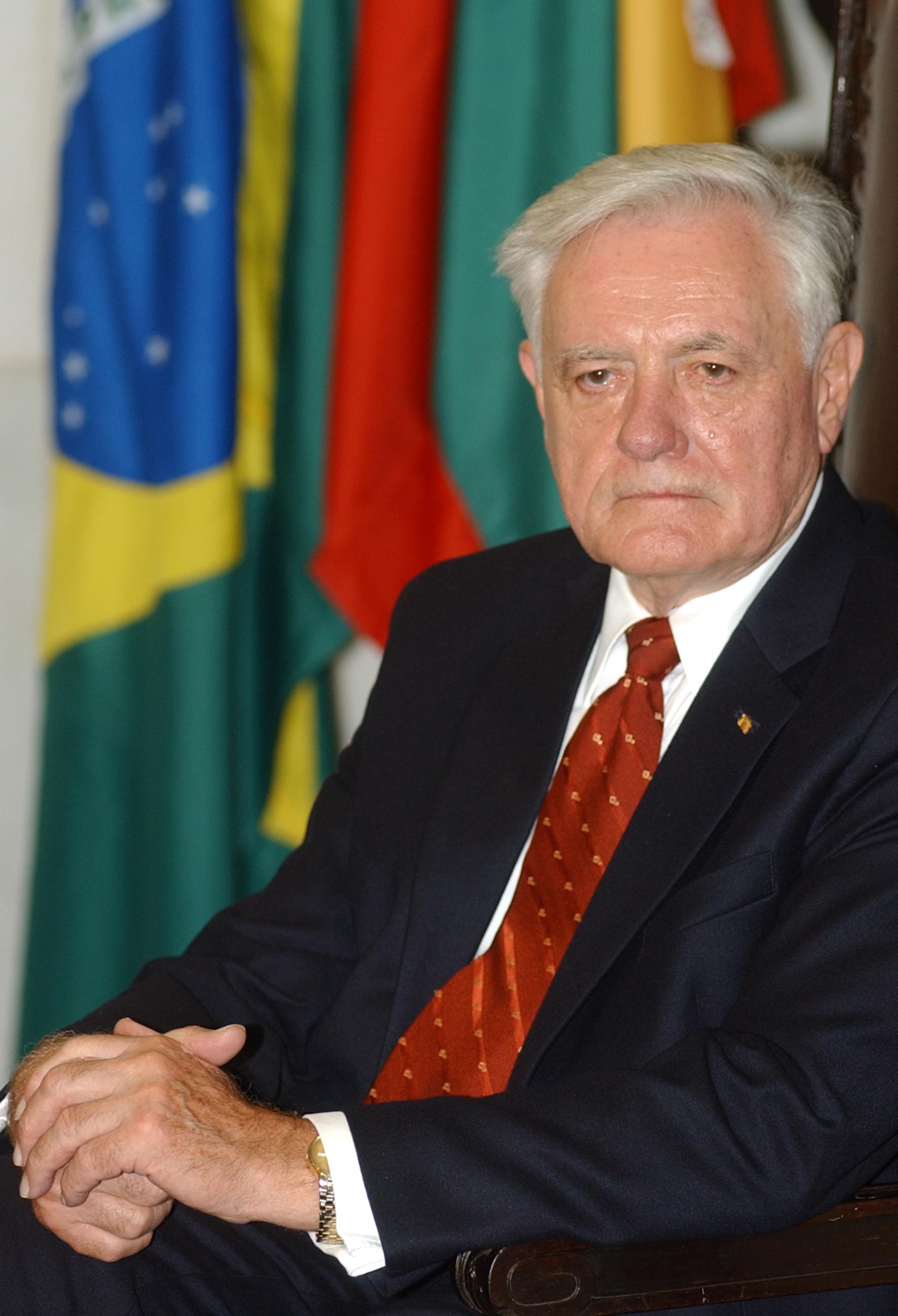
Valdas Adamkus, President of Lithuania 1998–2003 and 2004–2009

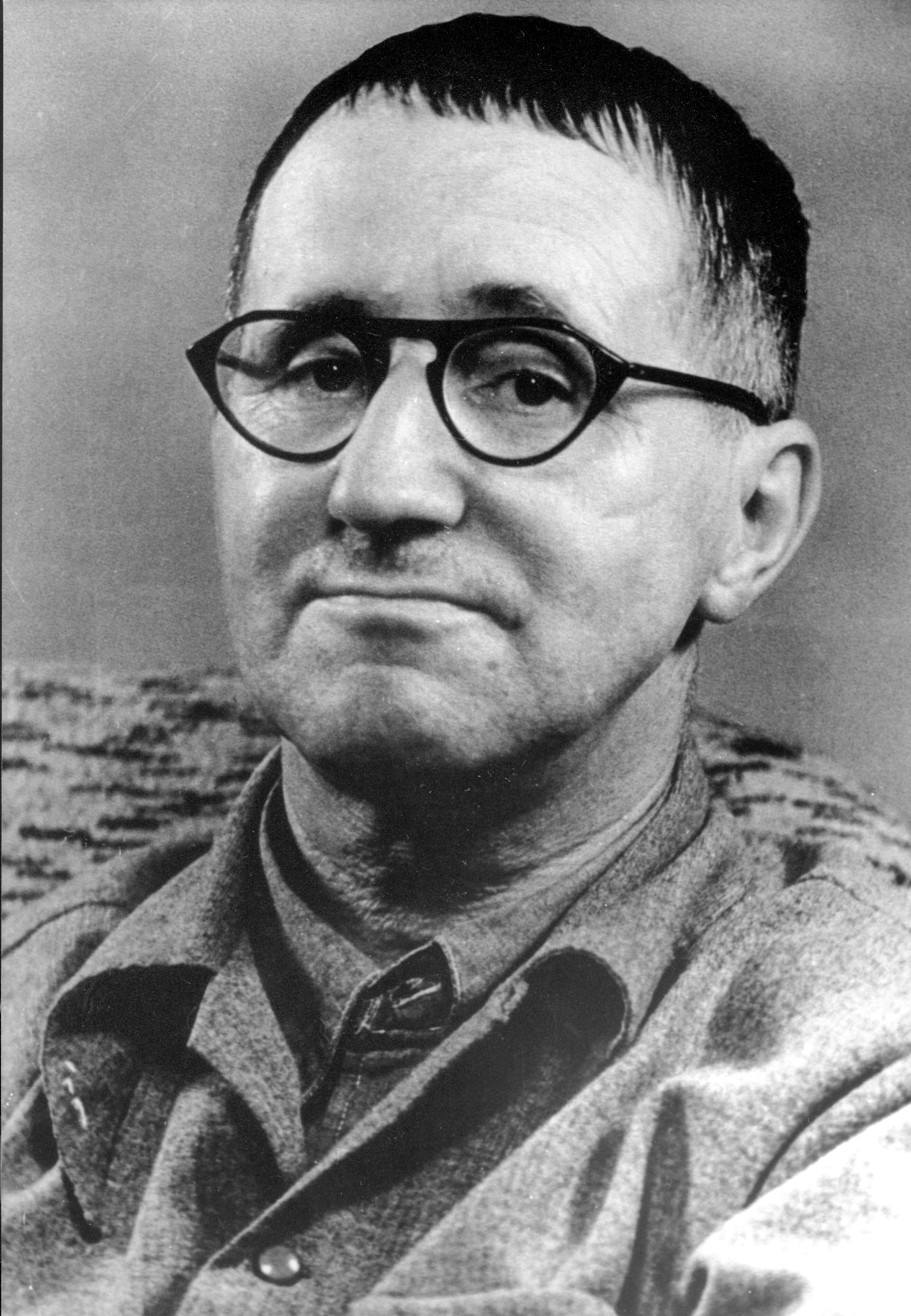
Bertolt Brecht, poet, playwright and theatre director

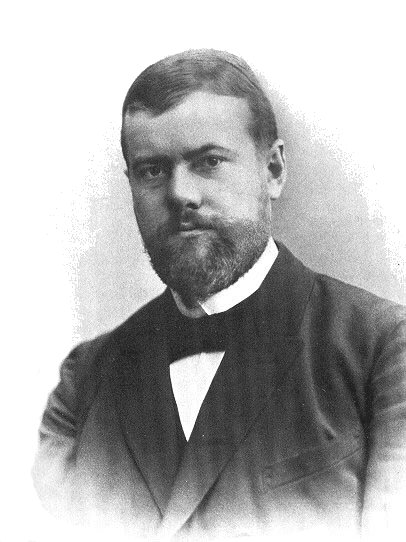
The sociologist Max Weber was a professor at LMU Munich.

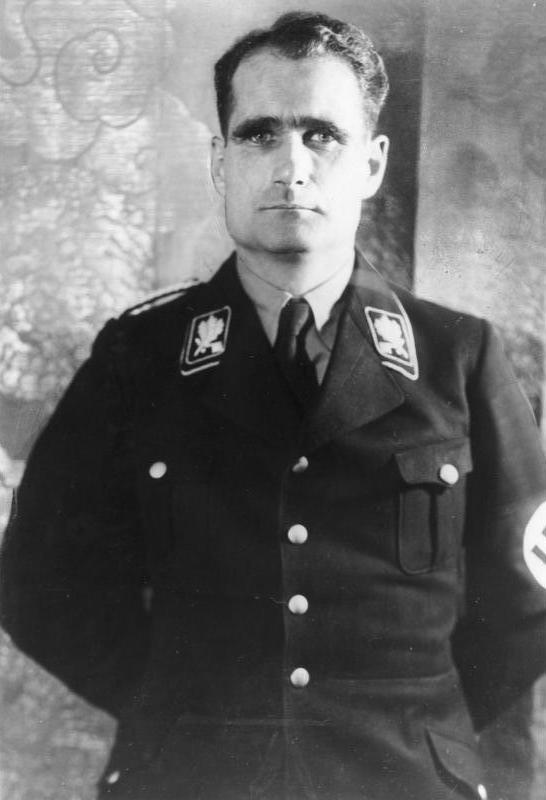
Rudolf Hess was the Deputy Führer of National Socialist Germany from 1933 to 1941.

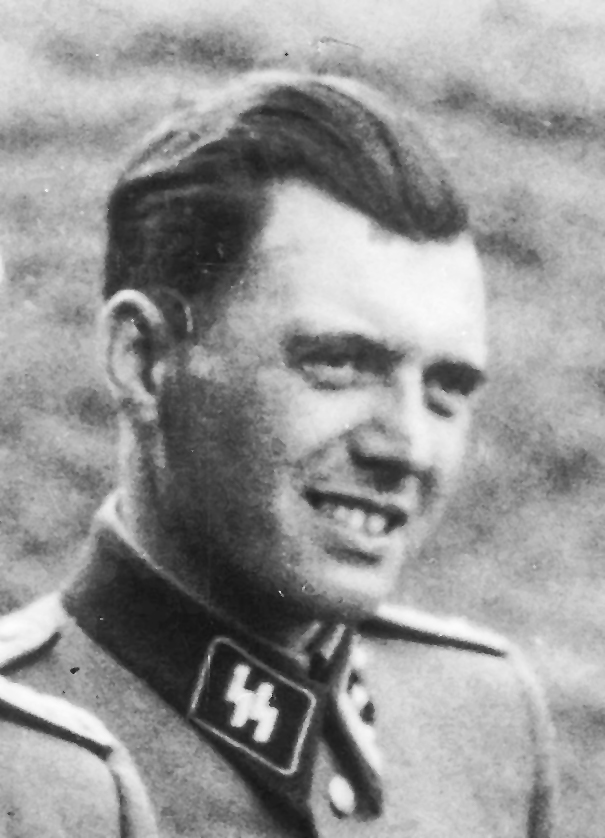
Josef Mengele was a Schutzstaffel (SS) officer.

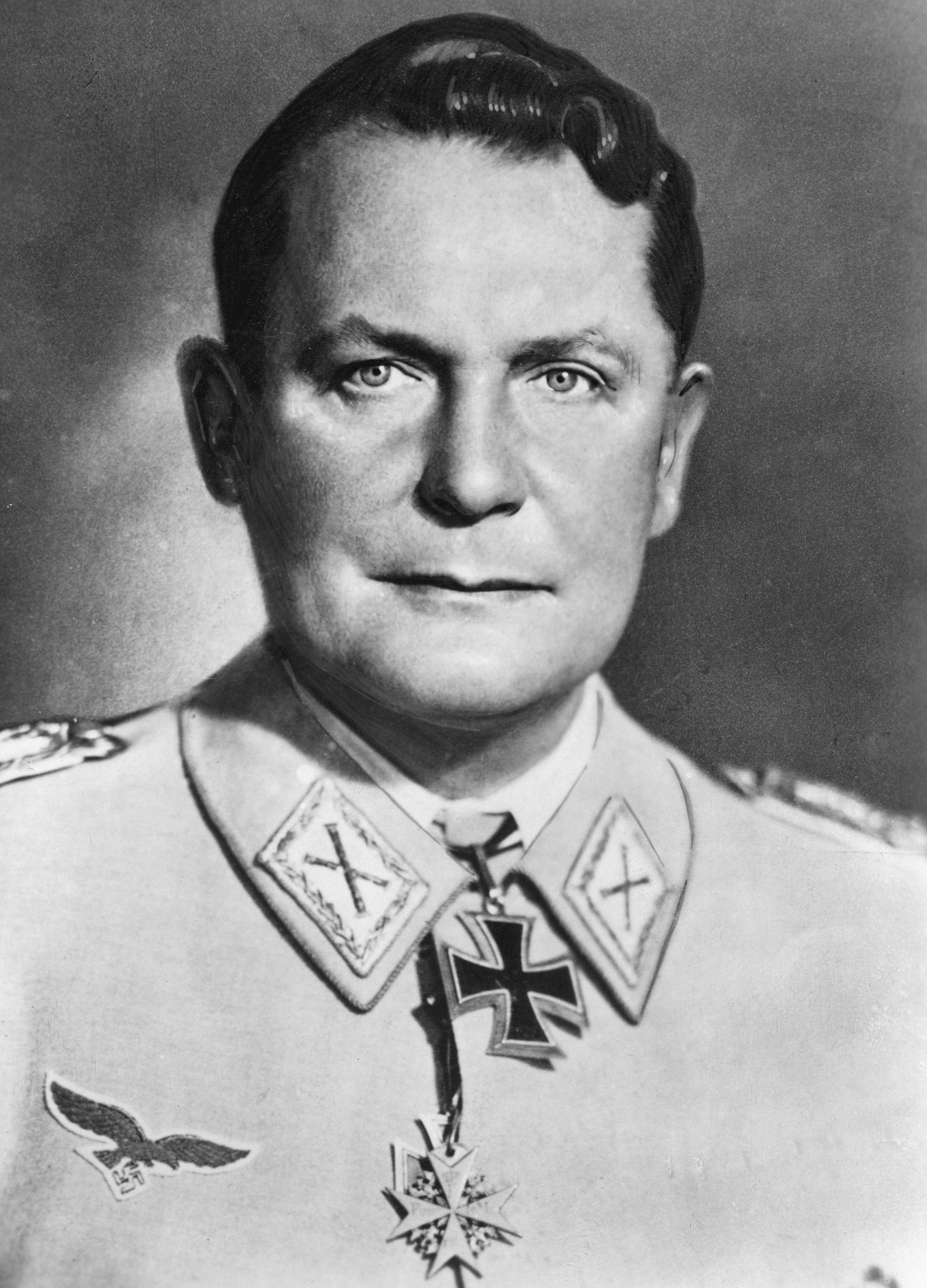
Hermann Göring was one of the most powerful figures in the Nazi Party.

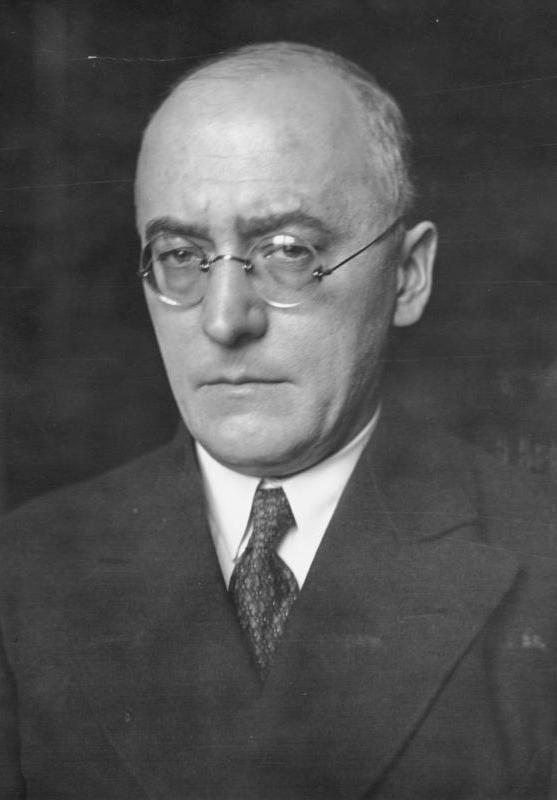
Heinrich Brüning served as Chancellor of Germany during the Weimar Republic from 1930 to 1932.

As of 2023, LMU Munich is associated with 50 Nobel laureates. Among these were Ferenc Krausz (2023), Svante Pääbo (2022), Reinhard Genzel (2020), Gerhard Ertl (2007), Theodor W. Hänsch (2005), Wolfgang Ketterle (2001), Günter Blobel (1999), Bert Sakmann (1991), Hartmut Michel (1988), Gerd Binnig (1986), Ernst Otto Fischer (1973), Karl von Frisch (1973), Konrad Lorenz (1973), Hans Bethe (1967), Feodor Lynen (1964), Hans Adolf Krebs (1953), Hermann Staudinger (1953), Wolfgang Pauli (1945), Otto Hahn (1944), Adolf Butenandt (1939), Richard Kuhn (1938), Peter Debye (1936), Otto Loewi (1936), Werner Heisenberg (1932), Hans Fischer (1930), Thomas Mann (1929), Heinrich Otto Wieland (1927), Gustav Ludwig Hertz (1925), Richard Adolf Zsigmondy (1925), Johannes Stark (1919), Max Planck (1918), Richard Willstätter (1915), Max von Laue (1914), Wilhelm Wien (1911), Paul Heyse (1910), Eduard Buchner (1907), Adolf von Baeyer (1905), Emil Fischer (1902), and Wilhelm Röntgen (1901).

== See also ==
- Education in Germany
- List of forestry universities and colleges
- List of modern universities in Europe (1801–1945)
- List of universities in Germany
