= Albrecht von Müller =

German philosopher and former entrepreneur

Albrecht von Müller (born 1954, Munich) is a German philosopher and former entrepreneur.

Since 2000, Müller has been the director of the Parmenides Center for the Study of Thinking, which is run by the non-profit organization Parmenides Foundation (founded by Müller) and is associated with LMU Munich. He is also a teacher of philosophy at LMU Munich as well as teaching the theory of thinking at the MCA program of the international school for advanced studies in Trieste, SISSA His main fields of interest are the concept of time and the theory of thinking, and in these fields he has made various publications. Müller is also an external contributor to programs of the Human Science Center and the Munich Center of Neuroscience at LMU Munich. Furthermore, he serves on the board of trustees of the Max Planck Institute for Neurobiology and the Max Planck Institute of Biochemistry.

Müller graduated as a PhD in philosophy at LMU Munich in 1982, after which he worked as a research student and subsequently as a program director at the Max Planck Society from 1982 until 1989, then was the director of the European Center for International Security EUCIS (a small non-governmental organization which he founded himself) from 1989 until 1995, according to some sources.

Müller is also known for the controversial Swiss dot com bubble company Think Tools AG. The March 2000 initial public offering of Think Tools AG made Müller, as the biggest shareholder, one of the wealthiest people in Switzerland for a short time. The software Think Tools sold by the company claimed to provide an aid to decision-making for large multinationals and governments. The company gained negative publicity because of its suspicious relations with the World Economic Forum, through accusations of plagiarism related to its main software product, as well as the software lacking most of the capabilities it was advertised to have. The value of the company collapsed in 2001.
