= List of companies affected by the dot-com bubble =

This is a list of companies that were affected by the dot-com bubble.

== Companies ==
- 3Com: Shares soared after announcing the corporate spin-off of Palm, Inc.
- 360networks: A fiber optic company that had a market capitalization of over $13 billion but filed for bankruptcy a few months later.
- AboveNet: Its stock rose 32% on the day it announced a stock split.
- Actua Corporation (formerly Internet Capital Group): A company that invested in B2B e-commerce companies, it reached a market capitalization of almost $60 billion at the height of the bubble, making Ken Fox, Walter Buckley, and Pete Musser billionaires on paper.
- Airspan Networks: A wireless firm; in July 2000, its stock price doubled on its first day of trading as investors focused on telecommunications companies instead of dot-com companies.
- Akamai Technologies: Its stock price rose over 400% on its first day of trading in October 1999.
- AltaVista: A Web search engine established in 1995. It became one of the most-used early search engines, but lost ground to Google and was purchased by Yahoo! in 2003.
- Alteon WebSystems: Its shares soared 294% on its first day of trading.
- Amazon.com: The company's stock fell over 90% across two years, from a high of US$107 to a low of US$7. Amazon stock briefly recovered in 2007, but again dropped in the 2008 market crash and did not recover until 2010.
- Beenz.com: A website where digital currency called Beenz was earned by shopping online, visiting websites etc.
- Blucora (then InfoSpace): Founded by Naveen Jain, at its peak its market cap was $31 billion and was the largest Internet business in the American Northwest. In March 2000, its stock price reached $1,305 per share, but by 2002 the price had declined to $2.
- Blue Coat Systems (formerly CacheFlow): Its stock price rose over 400% on its first day of trading in November 1999.
- Boo.com: An online clothing retailer, it spent $188 million in just six months. It filed for bankruptcy in May 2000.
- Books-A-Million: A book retailer whose stock price soared from around $3 per share on November 25, 1998, to $38.94 on November 27, 1998, and an intra-day high of $47.00 on November 30, 1998, after it announced an updated website. Two weeks later, the share price was back down to $10. By 2000, the share price had returned to $3.
- Broadband Sports: A network of sports-content websites that raised over $60 million before going bust in February 2001.
- Broadcast.com: A streaming media website that was acquired by Yahoo! for $5.9 billion in stock, making Mark Cuban and Todd Wagner multi-billionaires. The site is now defunct.
- CDNow: Founded by Jason Olim and his brother, it was an online retailer of compact discs and music-related products that reached a valuation of over $1 billion in April 1998. In 2000, it was acquired by Bertelsmann Music Group for $117 million and was later shut down.
- Chemdex.com: A company founded by David Perry that operated an online marketplace for businesses, it reached a market capitalization of over $7 billion despite minimal revenues.
- Cisco: While remaining a dominant presence in IT hardware and services, Cisco's stock price dropped over 89% during the dot-com bubble and as of 2022 had not recovered to its peak price from early 2000.
- Cobalt Networks: Its stock price rose over 400% on its first day of trading; acquired by Sun Microsystems for $2 billion in December 2000.
- Commerce One: A business-to-business software company that reached a valuation of $21 billion despite minimal revenue.
- Covad: Shares rose fivefold within months of its IPO.
- Cyberian Outpost: One of the first successful online shopping websites, it reached a peak market capitalization of $1 billion. It used controversial marketing campaigns including a Super Bowl ad in which fake gerbils were shot out of a cannon. It was acquired by Fry's Electronics in 2001 for $21 million, including the assumption of $13 million in debt.
- CyberRebate: Promised customers a 100% rebate after purchasing products priced at as much as 10 times the retail cost. It went bankrupt in 2001 and stopped paying rebates.
- Digex: one of the first Internet service providers in the United States, its stock price rose to $184 per share; the company was acquired for $1 per share a few years later.
- Digital Insight: Its shares soared 114% on its first day of trading.
- Divine: Founded by Andrew Filipowski, it was modeled after CMGI. It went public as the bubble burst and filed for bankruptcy after executives were accused of looting a subsidiary.
- DoubleClick: An online advertising company that soared after its IPO, it was acquired by Google in 2007.
- eGain: Its stock price doubled shortly after its 1999 IPO.
- Egghead Software: An online software retailer, its shares surged in 1998 as investors bought up shares of Internet companies; by 2001, the company was bankrupt.
- eToys.com: An online toy retailer whose stock price hit a high of $84.35 per share in October 1999. In February 2001, it filed for bankruptcy with $247 million in debt. It was acquired by KB Toys, which later also filed for bankruptcy.
- Excite: A web portal founded by Joe Kraus and others that merged with Internet service provider @Home Network in 1999 to become Excite@Home, promising to be the "AOL of broadband". After trying unsuccessfully to sell the Excite portal during a sharp downturn in online advertising, the company filed for bankruptcy in September 2001. It was acquired by Ask.com in March 2004.
- Flooz.com: A digital currency founded by Robert Levitan; it folded in 2001 due to lack of consumer acceptance. It was famous for having Whoopi Goldberg as its spokesperson.
- Forcepoint (formerly Websense): It held an IPO at the peak of the bubble.
- Freei: Filed for bankruptcy in October 2000, soon after canceling its IPO. At the time, it was the 5th largest Internet service provider in the United States, with 3.2 million users. Famous for its mascot, Baby Bob, the company lost $19 million in 1999 on revenues of less than $1 million.
- Gadzoox: A storage area network company, its shares tripled on its first day of trading giving it a market capitalization of $1.97 billion; the company was sold 4 years later for $5.3 million.
- Geeknet (formerly VA Linux): A provider of built-to-order Intel personal computer systems based on Linux and other open source projects, it set the record for largest first-day price gain upon its IPO on December 9, 1999; after the stock priced at $30/share, it ended the first day of trading at $239.25/share, a 698% gain, making founder Larry Augustin a billionaire on paper.
- GeoCities: Founded by David Bohnett, it was acquired by Yahoo! for $3.57 billion in January 1999 and was shut down in 2009.
- Global Crossing: A telecommunications company founded in 1997; it reached a market capitalization of $47 billion in February 2000 before filing bankruptcy in January 2002.
- theGlobe.com: A social networking service that launched in April 1995 and made headlines when its November 1998 IPO resulted in the largest first day gain of any IPO to date. CEO Stephan Paternot became a visible symbol of the excesses of dot-com millionaires and is famous for saying "Got the girl. Got the money. Now I'm ready to live a disgusting, frivolous life".
- govWorks: Founded by fraudster Kaleil Isaza Tuzman; it was featured in the documentary film Startup.com.
- Handspring: A PDA maker that was defunct by 2003, when it was purchased by Palm Inc.
- Healtheon: Founded by James H. Clark, merged with WebMD in 1999 with a stock swap valued at $7.9 billion but eventually shut down.
- HomeGrocer: A public online grocer that merged with Webvan.
- Infoseek: Founded by Steve Kirsch, it was acquired by Disney in 1999; it was valued at $7 billion but eventually shut down.
- inktomi: Founded by Eric Brewer, it reached a valuation of $25 billion in March 2000; acquired by Yahoo! in 2003 for $241 million.
- Inside.com: website and trade magazine that covered "the converging worlds of entertainment, media, music and technology," received $34 million in financing in 1999–2000 and was shut down in late 2001.
- Intel: This company retained its status as a leading manufacturer of computer components, but its stock price dropped almost 84% during the dot-com bubble and as of 2022 had not recovered its early 2000 price.
- Interactive Intelligence: A telecommunications software company, founded by Donald E Brown, whose stock doubled on its first day of trading.
- Internet America: Its stock price doubled in a day in December 1999 despite no specific news about the company.
- iVillage: On its first day of trading in March 1999, its stock rose 255% to $84 per share. It was acquired by NBC for $8.50 per share in 2006 and shut down.
- iWon: Backed by CBS, it gave away $1 million to a lucky contestant each month and $10 million in April 2000 on a half-hour special program that was broadcast on CBS.
- Kozmo.com: Founded by Joseph Park, it offered one-hour local delivery of several items with no delivery fees from March 1998 until it went bust in April 2001.
- Lastminute.com: Founded by Martha Lane Fox and Brent Hoberman, its IPO in the United Kingdom on March 14, 2000, coincided with the bursting of the bubble. Shares placed initially at 380p sharply rose to 511p, but had collapsed to below 190p by the first week of April 2000.
- The Learning Company (formerly SoftKey): Owned by Kevin O'Leary, it was acquired by Mattel in 1999 for $3.5 billion and sold a year later for $27.3 million.
- Liquid Audio: Despite its stock doubling in value on its first day of trading in July 1999, its technology was obsolete by 2004.
- LookSmart: Founded by Evan Thornley, its value rose from $23 million to $5 billion within months, but it lost 99% of its value as the bubble burst.
- Lucent Technologies: Stock crashed by nearly 99% after the dot-com bubble burst, plummeting from a split-adjusted peak of \(\$84\) per share at the height of the market in 1999 to an all-time low of just \(\$0.55\) in October 2002.
- Lycos: Founded by Michael Loren Mauldin, under the leadership of Bob Davis, it was acquired by Terra Networks for $12.5 billion in May 2000. It was sold in 2004 to Seoul, South Korea-based Daum Communications Corporation for $95.4 million.
- MarchFirst: A web development company formed on March 1, 2000, by the merger of USWeb and CKS Group, it filed for bankruptcy and liquidation just over a year after it was formed.
- Microsoft: Their stock went from 60 cents in 1990 to over $60 in late 1999, then dropped about 60% during the dot-com crash and by its low point in early 2009 the stock was down over 74% from its peak. Microsoft products are widely used globally, but their stock did not recover from the dot-com crash until 2016.
- MicroStrategy: After rising from $7 to as high as $333 in a year, its shares lost $140, or 62%, on March 20, 2000, following the announcement of a financial restatement for the previous two years by founder Michael J. Saylor.
- Net2Phone: A VoIP provider founded by Howard Jonas whose stock price soared after its 1999 IPO.
- NetBank: A direct bank, its stock price per share fluctuated between $3.50 and $83 in 1999.
- Netscape: After a popular IPO, it was acquired by AOL in 1999 for $4.2 billion in stock.
- Network Solutions: A domain name registrar led by Jim Rutt, it was acquired by Verisign for $21 billion in March 2000, at the peak of the bubble.
- Nortel Networks Corporation: A Canadian telecommunications equipment manufacturer. At its height, Nortel accounted for more than a third of the total valuation of the Toronto Stock Exchange. Its market capitalization fell from C$398 billion in September 2000 to less than C$5 billion in August 2002.
- NorthPoint Communications: Agreed to a significant investment by Verizon and a merger of DSL businesses in September 2000; however, Verizon backed out 2 months later after NorthPoint was forced to restate its financial statements, including a 20% reduction in revenue, after its customers failed to pay as the bubble burst. NorthPoint then filed for bankruptcy. After lawsuits from both parties, Verizon and NorthPoint settled out of court.
- Palm, Inc.: Spun off from 3Com at the peak of the bubble, its shares plunged as the bubble burst.
- Pets.com: Led by Julie Wainwright, it sold pet supplies to retail customers before filing for bankruptcy in 2000.
- PFSweb: A B2B company whose stock price doubled after its IPO.
- Pixelon: Streaming video company that hosted a $16 million dot-com party in October 1999 in Las Vegas with celebrities including Chely Wright, LeAnn Rimes, Faith Hill, Dixie Chicks, Sugar Ray, Natalie Cole, Kiss, Tony Bennett, The Brian Setzer Orchestra, and a reunion of The Who. The company failed less than a year later when it became apparent that its technologies were fraudulent or misrepresented. Its founder had been a convicted felon who changed his name.
- PLX Technology: Shares rose fivefold within months of its IPO.
- Prodigy: An ISP whose stock price doubled on its first day of trading.
- Pseudo.com: One of the first live streaming video websites, it produced its own content in a studio in SoHo, Manhattan and streamed up to seven hours of live programming a day on its website.
- Qualcomm: This company's stock dropped over 86% during the dot-com crash, and didn't break even until 2019.
- Radvision: A videotelephony company, its stock price rose 150% on its first day of trading.
- Razorfish: An Internet advertising consultancy, its stock doubled on its first day of trading in April 1999.
- Redback Networks: A telecommunications equipment company, its stock soared 266% in its first day of trading, giving it a market capitalization of $1.77 billion.
- Register.com: A domain name registrar, its stock soared after its IPO in March 2000, at the peak of the bubble.
- Ritmoteca.com: One of the first online music stores selling music on a pay-per-download basis and an early predecessor to the iTunes business model. It pioneered digital distribution deals as one of the first companies to sign agreements with major music publishers.
- Savvis: A fiber optic company.
- Scout Electromedia: A consumer electronics company, its only product, Modo, a "city focused" pager geared to young adults, was discontinued a month after its release and one day before its Los Angeles launch. According to reports, $20-$27 million of its $40 million investment was used for advertising.
- Steel Connect (formerly CMGI Inc.): a company that invested in many Internet startups; between 1995 and 1999, its stock appreciated 4,921%, but declined 99% when the bubble burst.
- Terra Networks: A web portal and Internet access provider in the US, Spain and Ibero-America. After its November 1999 IPO, its shares skyrocketed from an initial price of €11 to €158 in just three months. The price then sunk under €3 in a matter of weeks. In February 2005, the company was acquired by Telefónica.
- Think Tools: One of the most extreme symptoms of the bubble in Europe, this company reached a market valuation of CHF2.5 billion in March 2000 despite no prospects of having a product.
- TIBCO Software: Its stock price rose tenfold shortly after its 1999 IPO.
- Tradex Technologies: A B2B e-commerce company, it was sold for $5.6 billion at the height of the bubble, making Daniel Aegerter a billionaire on paper.
- Transmeta: A semiconductor designer that attempted to challenge Intel, its IPO in November 2000 was the last successful technology IPO until the IPO of Google in 2004. The company shut down in 2009 after failing to execute.
- uBid: An online auction site founded in 1997 as a subsidiary of PCM, Inc. that went public in December 1998 at $15 per share before its stock price soared to $186 per share, a market value of $1.5 billion.
- United Online: An ISP formed by the merger of NetZero and Juno Online Services as the bubble burst.
- Usinternetworking Inc: Its stock price rose 174% on its first day of trading.
- UUNET: One of the largest Internet service providers, its stock price soared after its 1995 IPO; it was acquired in 1996.
- Verio: A web hosting provider, it was acquired for $5 billion at the peak of the bubble.
- VerticalNet: A host of 43 business-to-business (B2B) procurement portals that was valued at $1.6 billion after its IPO, despite having only $3.6 million in quarterly revenue.
- Vignette Corporation: Its stock rose 1,500% within months after its IPO.
- WebChat Broadcasting System: the largest and most popular online chat, interactive and event network with around 3 million registered users, it was purchased by Infoseek in April 1998 for approximately $6.7 million; Go.com acquired Infoseek later in 1998, and closed WebChat in September 1999.
- Webvan: An online grocer that promised delivery within 30 minutes; it went bankrupt in 2001 after $396 million of venture capital funding and an IPO that raised $375 million and was folded into Amazon.com.
- World Online: a Netherlands-based Internet service provider, it became a public company on March 17, 2000, at a €12 billion valuation, the largest IPO on the Euronext Amsterdam, and the largest European Internet company IPO.
- Yahoo!: A company that, under the leadership of Timothy Koogle, Jerry Yang, and David Filo acquired several companies for billions of dollars in stock, only to shut them down a few years later.
