= Sangeeta Bhatia =

American nanotechnologist (born 1968)

Sangeeta N. Bhatia
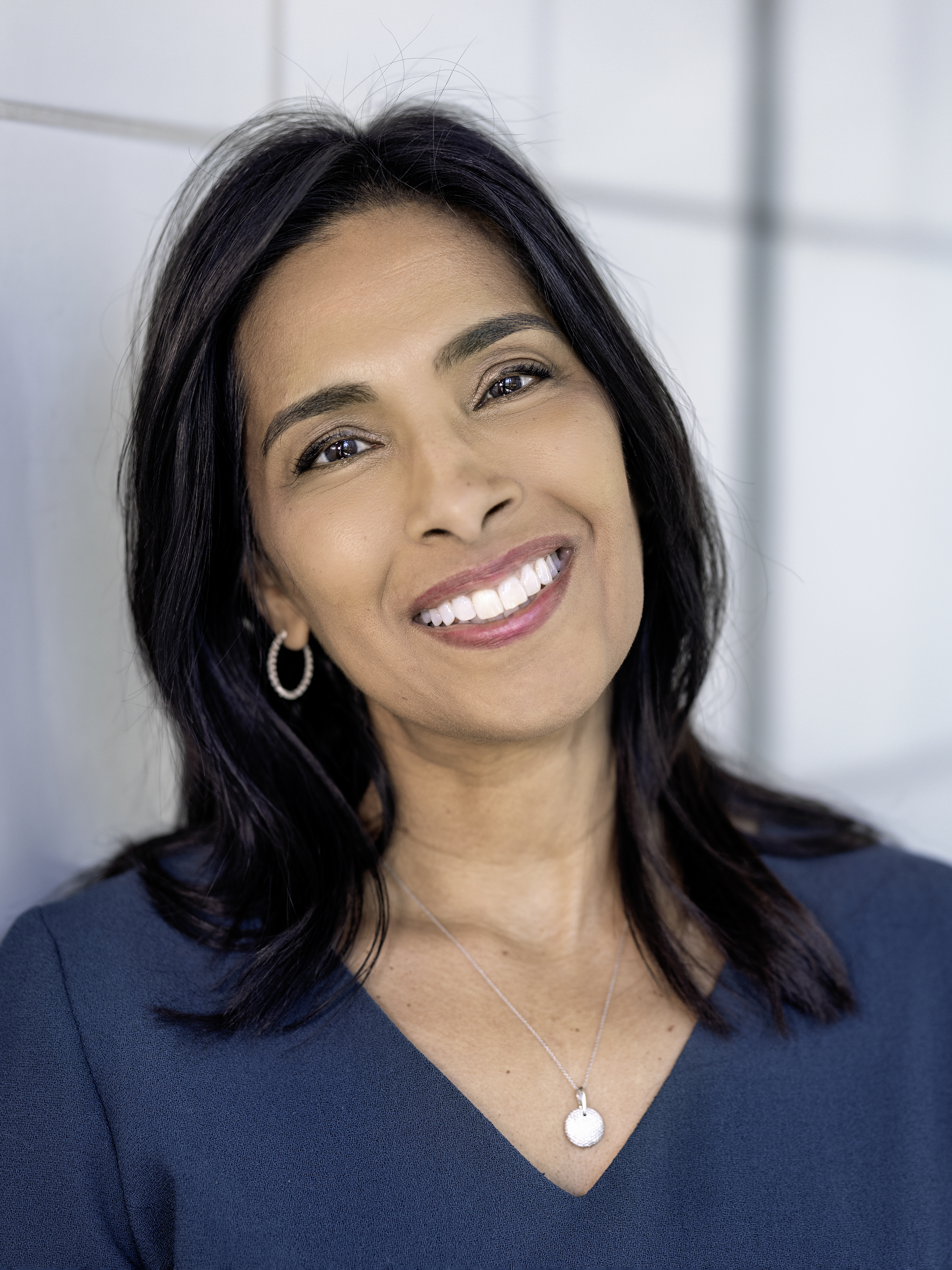
- Sangeeta N. Bhatia in 2023
- Born: June 24, 1968 (age 58)
- Citizenship: American
- Education: Brown University (B.S.); Massachusetts Institute of Technology (M.S., Ph.D.); Harvard Medical School (M.D.)
- Known for: Nanotechnology for tissue repair and regeneration
- Awards: Packard Fellowship (1999–2004); Howard Hughes Medical Institute investigator (2008); Lemelson–MIT Prize; Heinz Award (2015); Othmer Gold Medal (2019)
- Scientific career
- Fields: Nanotechnology, Tissue engineering
- Workplaces: Massachusetts General Hospital; University of California, San Diego (1998–2005); Massachusetts Institute of Technology (2005– )
- Academic advisors: Mehmet Toner

Sangeeta N. Bhatia (born June 24, 1968) is an American inventor, professor, and entrepreneur who holds both medical and engineering training. She holds multiple appointments and directs substantial research programs at the Massachusetts Institute of Technology (MIT) in Cambridge, Massachusetts She is reported to be the first woman physician-scientist to be elected to all five of the United States' National Academies.

== Current appointments and affiliations ==
At MIT, Bhatia is the John J. and Dorothy Wilson Professor at both the Institute for Medical Engineering & Science (IMES) and the Department of Electrical Engineering & Computer Science (EECS). She serves as the Director of the Marble Center for Cancer Nanomedicine at the Koch Institute for Integrative Cancer Research and is an Investigator of the Howard Hughes Medical Institute. Her affiliations also extend to being an Institute Member of the Broad Institute and an Associate Faculty at the Wyss Institute for Biologically Inspired Engineering.

Beyond her research and academic roles, Bhatia is the Founding Director of the MIT Faculty Founder Initiative. This initiative is dedicated to increasing the representation of MIT faculty members, particularly women, who launch biotechnology companies, addressing a significant gender gap in biotech entrepreneurship.

Bhatia has been a member of Brown University's board of trustees since 2015, serving as a fellow since 2019 and as chair of academic affairs currently. She serves on the board of directors at Vertex Pharmaceuticals, where she chairs the science and technology committee. She has presented on the application of engineering approaches to medical problems at events including the World Economic Forum, TED, the Bill & Melinda Gates Foundation's Grand Challenges, and the Cancer Moonshot.

== Research and Impact ==
Bhatia leverages miniaturization tools drawn from the computer industry to drive medical innovation. Her groundbreaking work has broad applications in cancer, liver, and infectious diseases, leading to significant advancements in early disease detection, human disease modeling, tissue regeneration, cell transplantation, and the development of cancer therapeutics.

Bhatia's laboratory, the Laboratory for Multiscale Regenerative Technologies (LMRT), operates at the interface of living and synthetic systems, engineering micro and nanotechnologies to tackle complex human health challenges.

=== Liver Disease ===
Bhatia's doctoral work laid the foundation for keeping liver cells functional outside the human body. By adapting techniques from computer chip design and photolithography, she microfabricated substrates that support the growth and function of 2D and 3D human liver cells in a lab dish. This led to the invention of the "microliver," a miniature model organ that revolutionized the efficient testing of drug reactions. It is now used globally by companies to evaluate drug efficacy and predict toxic side effects. Further research in her lab, including the use of 3D printing to create synthetic vascular systems, aims to develop larger tissue structures with the ultimate goal of an artificial human liver. This foundational work was among the first at MIT in the area of biological micro-electromechanical systems (Bio-MEMS).

The LMRT continues to apply micro- and nanotechnology to tissue repair and regeneration, studying the interactions between hepatocytes (liver cells) and their microenvironment. This work improves cellular therapies for liver disease, maximizes hepatocyte function, and enhances the understanding of liver physiology and pathophysiology. Her research has been instrumental in studying diseases like hepatitis and malaria. In collaboration with Christopher Chen at Boston University, Bhatia's lab developed human microlivers that can be transplanted, vascularized, and survive in vivo, offering potential curative therapies for both heritable and acquired liver diseases.

=== Cancer and infectious diseases ===
A significant area of LMRT's work involves developing nanomaterials as tools for biological studies and as multifunctional agents for cancer therapies. This includes designing nanoparticles and nanoporous materials that can home in on tumors, signal cellular changes, enhance imaging, or deliver therapeutic components. Early work in 2002, with Erkki Ruoslahti, involved developing phage-derived peptide-targeted nanomaterials for in vivo tumor targeting. More recently, Bhatia, in collaboration with Erkki Ruoslahti and Michael Sailor, has explored engineering beneficial probiotics to detect or treat cancer cells.

For over a decade, LMRT has pioneered new technologies in activity-based diagnostics. This includes designing nanosensors with biological molecules, such as peptide barcodes, that can signal the presence of diseases like cancer when interacting with aberrantly active enzymes (proteases) in diseased tissue. These specialized nanoparticles allow for detection via simple tests on urine similar to an at-home pregnancy test, breath, or blood samples. This platform has expanded to detect 12 diseases, including 6 cancer types. Nanosensors can be administered via inhalation, intramuscular injection, and even ingested in the form of probiotic bacteria. The LMRT is also exploring breath-based diagnostics for rapid results and has developed diagnostic tools that use DNA barcodes and CRISPR technology, making cancer diagnostics more affordable and accessible for low- and middle-resource settings.

== Early life and education ==
Sangeeta Bhatia was born in 1968 in Boston, Massachusetts, to parents who emigrated from India. She is an alumna of Lexington High School in Lexington, MA. Her father was an engineer and entrepreneur, and her mother was one of the first women to receive an MBA in India. Bhatia's interest in engineering was sparked during her 10th-grade biology class and a visit with her father to an MIT lab, where she witnessed a demonstration of an ultrasound machine for cancer treatment.

She pursued bioengineering at Brown University, where her involvement in a research group studying artificial organs solidified her decision to pursue graduate studies in the field. After graduating with honors in 1990, Bhatia was initially rejected from the MD-PhD program run by the Harvard-MIT Division of Health Sciences and Technology (HST) but was accepted into the Mechanical Engineering Master's program. She was subsequently accepted into the HST MD-PhD program, where she was advised by Mehmet Toner. She received her Ph.D. in 1997 and her M.D. in 1999, followed by postdoctoral training at Massachusetts General Hospital. Bhatia met her husband, Jagesh Shah, as classmates in HST. Shah is currently an executive in the biotechnology industry. They have two daughters.

== Career ==
Bhatia began her academic career in 1998, joining the bioengineering faculty at the University of California, San Diego (UCSD). As an assistant professor, she was awarded a five-year Packard Fellowship for Science and Engineering from the David and Lucile Packard Foundation in 1999. She was recognized with a "Teacher of the Year" award at the Jacobs School of Engineering in 2001, and was named an "Innovator under 35" by MIT Technology Review in 2003.

Bhatia co-authored the first undergraduate textbook on tissue engineering, Tissue engineering (2004), written for senior-level and first-year graduate courses with Bernhard Palsson. She was a co-editor of Microdevices in Biology and Medicine (2009) and Biosensing: International Research and Development (2005). In 2005, she joined the MIT faculty in the Division of Health Sciences & Technology and the Department of Electrical Engineering and Computer Science. The Scientist named her a "Scientist to Watch" in 2006, and she became a Howard Hughes Medical Institute Investigator in 2008.

Since 2013, Bhatia has expanded her affiliations within MIT and Harvard, including the Ludwig Center for Molecular Oncology (2013), the Broad Institute of MIT and Harvard (2014), the MIT Center for Neurobiological Engineering (2016), the Wyss Institute for Biologically Inspired Engineering (2018), and the Martin Trust Center for MIT Entrepreneurship (2022).

Bhatia currently directs the Laboratory for Multiscale Regenerative Technologies and the Marble Center for Cancer Nanomedicine at MIT. She has been affiliated with Brigham and Women's Hospital and is a member of the intramural faculty at the Koch Institute for Integrative Cancer Research. She served on the National Cancer Institute (NCI) Board of Scientific Advisors and co-led the first synthetic biomarker think tank at the NCI (SYNDICATE) with the late Sanjiv Gambhir. She also co-chaired the first AACR conference on Precision Prevention, Early Detection, and Interception of Cancer, and the annual Irwin M. Arias Symposium, a leading event in liver research.

== Entrepreneurship, Outreach, and Advocacy ==
Bhatia is a prolific inventor, holding more than 65 issued or pending patents for clinical and biotechnological applications of engineering principles over twenty years. Her entrepreneurial ventures include:

- In 2008, she co-founded Hepregen, based on her microliver technology for drug testing. Hepregen was acquired by BioIVT in 2018.
- In 2015, Bhatia spun off Glympse Bio based on her activity-based nanosensor technology. Glympse Bio received significant funding to advance "activity sensors" for diagnosis and therapy selection, completing safety studies in human volunteers before merging with Sunbird Bio in 2023.
- She has also co-founded other startups, notably Satellite Bio (microliver "satellite" technology with Christopher Chen), Port Therapeutics (along with Gabe Kwong and Mikhail Shapiro), Impilo Therapeutics (with Erkki Ruoslahti, Frank Slack, and Michael Sailor; the company was acquired by Lisata Therapeutics in 2020), Ropirio Therapeutics (with Christopher Chen), Matrisome Bio (with Richard Hynes), and Amplifyer Bio (with J. Christopher Love, Viktor Adalsteinsson, and Todd Golub).

Bhatia is a passionate advocate for gender equity and inclusivity in STEM fields. She co-founded the MIT Faculty Founders Initiative with MIT Professor and President Emerita Susan Hockfield and MIT Amgen Professor of Biology Emerita Nancy Hopkins. This initiative aims to address the significant disparity in the number of female academics in science and engineering who become entrepreneurs. Their research revealed that women had founded less than 10% of the 250 biotech startups created by MIT professors, despite women comprising 22% of the MIT faculty. Her dedication to diversity extends to:

- Founding the Biomedical Engineering Society's Diversity Committee.
- Co-founding KEYs (Keys to Empowering Youth), a program that brings middle-school girls to visit high-tech labs to encourage their interest in science and technology.
- Chairing the Institute of Medical Engineering and Science Diversity Committee at MIT.
- Serving on the Faculty Gender Equity Committee at the MIT School of Engineering and advising the MIT Society of Women Engineers.

Bhatia's advocacy and groundbreaking work have made her a public figure, featured in diverse media. She has been named one of Fast Company's Most Creative People (2014) and a Foreign Policy's leading global thinker. Her inspiring story has been featured on TV Nova Science Now, in the film Picture a Scientist, and in various books and podcasts. She's even been rendered as a LEGO minifigure and recognized among Vogue India's Incredible Women, showcasing her broad impact and visibility. Bhatia and her over 85 trainees have contributed to more than 230 peer-reviewed scientific papers and more than 65 issued or pending patents over twenty years. As of 2025, Bhatia has launched 8 biotechnology companies at the intersection of medicine and miniaturization. About three-quarter of her former postdoctoral trainees are current academic faculty members (half of which are already tenured), while a quarter of her 39 Ph.D. graduates are academic faculty members and another quarter hold Director or C-suite roles in biotech and pharma companies. Notably, about half of her graduate and post-graduate trainees in the past decade have identified as female. She has mentored a next generation of academic faculty in nanomedicine and bioengineering at institutions worldwide. Notable alumni from her lab include:

- Amit Agrawal, Chief Scientific Officer, Diagnostics Platform, Danaher
- Ava Amini, Principal Researcher, Microsoft
- Warren Chan, Dean of the College of Engineering and President's Chair Professor in Engineering, Nanyang Technological University Singapore
- Arnav Chhabra, Co-founder, Satellite Bio
- Alice Chen, Chief Operating Officer, Curve Biosciences
- Amanda Chen, Vice President, Vertex Ventures HC
- Tal Danino, Associate Professor, Columbia University
- Jaideep Dudani, CEO, Ouro Medicines
- Gabe Kwong, Professor, Georgia Institute of Technology
- Geoffrey von Maltzahn, General Partner at Flagship Pioneering
- Vyas Ramanan, Venture Partner, Third Rock Ventures
- Simone Schürle-Finke, Associate Professor, ETH Zurich
- Andrew Warren, Senior Director, Curie.Bio

== Awards and honors ==
As an inventor and advocate for diversity in science and engineering, Bhatia has received numerous honors. She is the first female physician-scientist in history to be an elected member of all five national academies in the U.S.:

- National Academy of Engineering (2015).
- American Academy of Arts and Sciences (2015).
- National Academy of Inventors (2016).
- National Academy of Sciences (2017).
- National Academy of Medicine (2019).

External videos
- "This tiny particle could roam your body to find tumors", Sangeeta Bhatia, TED Talks Live, November 2015
- "Sangeeta Bhatia, 2014 Lemelson-MIT Prize Winner", January 29, 2015

Bhatia is also a Foreign Fellow of the Australian Academy of Technological Sciences and Engineering. Other notable awards include:

- Lemelson-MIT Prize (2014) – known as the "Oscar for inventors", for groundbreaking inventions and dedication to the next generation of scientists.
- Heinz Award for Technology (2015) – for groundbreaking inventions and advocacy for women in STEM fields.
- Othmer Gold Medal (2019) – from the Science History Institute.
- Several honorary doctorate degrees, including from the Icahn School of Medicine at Mount Sinai (2021), University of London Institute Cancer Research (2019), and Utrecht University in the Netherlands (2017).

=== Awards ===
Bhatia is the recipient of a number of awards and honors including the following:

- 2023, Overseas Fellow of the Australian Academy of Technological Sciences and Engineering (FTSE)
- 2019, Othmer Gold Medal, Science History Institute and others
- 2018, honorary Doctorate, Utrecht University
- 2017, Catalyst Award, Science Club for Girls
- 2015, Heinz Award, Heinz Family Foundation, in the Technology, the Economy and Employment category "for her seminal work in tissue engineering and disease detection, including the cultivation of functional liver cells outside of the human body, and for her passion in promoting the advancement of women in the STEM fields."
- 2014, Lemelson-MIT Prize, Massachusetts Institute of Technology "for her dedication to the next generation of scientists, and groundbreaking inventions to improve human health and patient care on a global scale."
- 2011, BEAM (Brown Engineering Alumni Medal) Award, Brown University School of Engineering
- 2008, Howard Hughes Medical Institute investigator
- 1999, Packard Fellowship, David and Lucile Packard Foundation

== Books ==
- Bhatia, Sangeeta (1999). Microfabrication in tissue engineering and bioartificial organs. Microsystems. Vol. 5. Boston: Kluwer Academic Publishers. doi:10.1007/978-1-4615-5235-2. ISBN 978-1-4613-7386-5.
- Palsson, Bernhard; Bhatia, Sangeeta (2004). Tissue engineering. Upper Saddle River, N.J.: Pearson Prentice Hall. ISBN 0-13-041696-7. OCLC 52960378.
- Nahmias, Yaakov; Bhatia, Sangeeta (2009). Microdevices in biology and medicine. Boston: Artech House. ISBN 978-1-59693-405-4. OCLC 542050628.
- Schultz, Jerome; Mrksich, Milan; Bhatia, Sangeeta N.; Brady, David J.; Ricco, Antionio J.; Walt, David R.; Wilkins, Charles L., eds. (July 15, 2006). Biosensing: International Research and Development. Springer Science & Business Media. ISBN 978-1-4020-4058-0.
