= Freemium =

Free product where the extras require payment

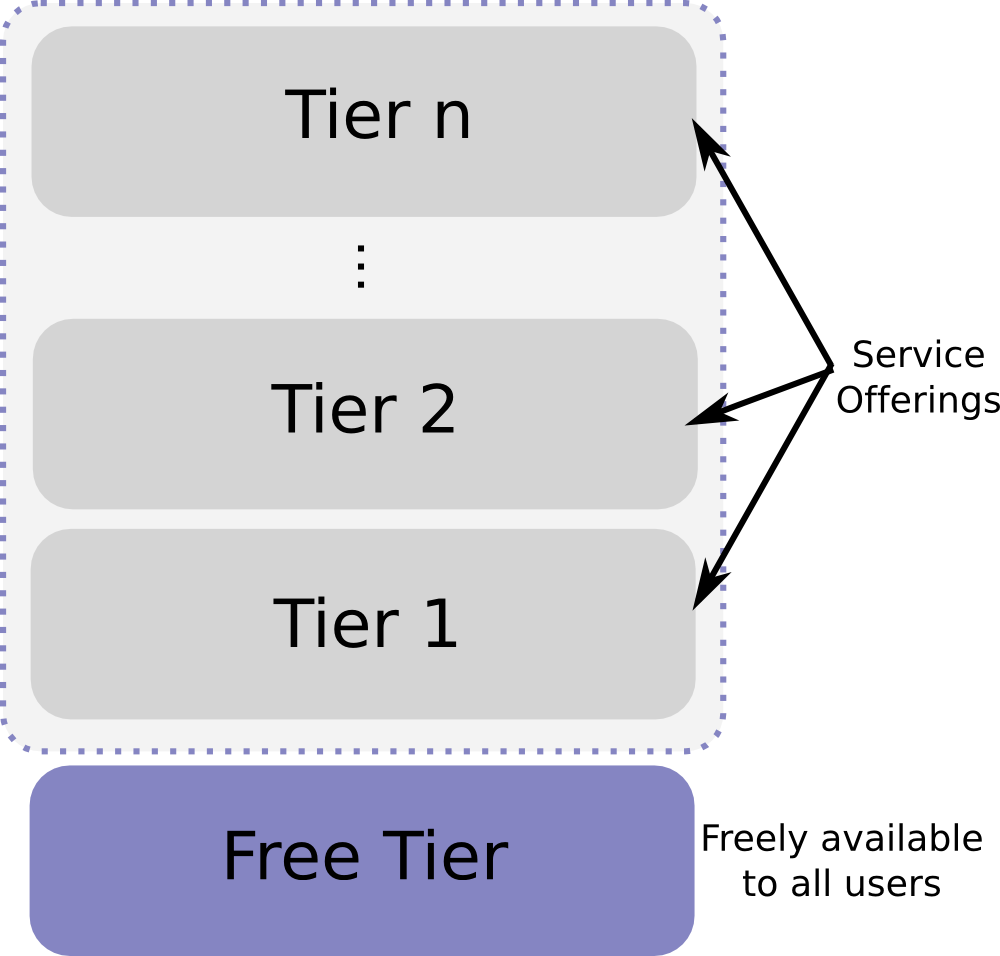
In the freemium business model, business tiers start with a "free" tier.

Freemium, a portmanteau of the words "free" and "premium", is a pricing strategy by which a basic product or service is provided free of charge, but money (a premium) is charged for additional features, services and virtual (online) or physical (offline) goods that expand the functionality of the free version of the software. This business model has been used in the software industry since the 1980s and is closely related to tiered services. A subset of this model used by the video game industry is called free-to-play.

The term freemium was coined in 2006 in response to a blog post by venture capitalist Fred Wilson. Freemium services commonly limit the free version by features, capacity, or time, while reserving additional functionality or content for paid users. The model is used in software, online services, media paywalls, and video games, where revenue may come from subscriptions, advertising, or purchases of premium content. It has also been the subject of criticism, particularly in discussions of monetization practices in some free-to-play games.

== Origin ==
The business model has been in use for software since the 1980s. The term freemium to describe this model was coined much later, in response to a 2006 blog post by venture capitalist Fred Wilson summarizing the model:

Give your service away for free, possibly ad supported but maybe not, acquire a lot of customers very efficiently through word of mouth, referral networks, organic search marketing, etc., then offer premium-priced value-added services or an enhanced version of your service to your customer base.

Jarid Lukin of Alacra, one of Wilson's portfolio companies, then suggested the term "freemium" for this model.

In 2009, Chris Anderson published the book Free, which examines the popularity of this business model. As well as for traditional proprietary software and services, it is now also often used by Web 2.0 and open source companies. In 2014, Eric Seufert published the book Freemium Economics, which examines the freemium model in software products and the use of analytics and user segmentation in implementing it.

The freemium model is closely related to tiered services. Notable examples include LinkedIn, Badoo, Discord, Spotify and in the form of a "soft" paywall, such as those employed by The New York Times and La Presse+. This is often in a time-limited or feature-limited version to promote a paid-for full version. The model is particularly suited to software as the cost of distribution is negligible.

A freemium model is sometimes used to build a consumer base when the marginal cost of producing additional copies is low. Thus, little is lost by giving away free software licenses as long as significant cannibalization is avoided. Research on freemium services emphasizes balancing the free tier so it attracts and retains users without reducing the perceived value of the premium tier. Other examples include free-to-play games – video games that can be downloaded without paying. Video game publishers of free-to-play games rely on other means to generate revenue – such as optional in-game virtual items that can be purchased by players to enhance gameplay or aesthetics.

== Types of product limitations ==
Ways in which the product or service may be limited or restricted in the free version include:

- Limited features: A free video chat client may not include three-way video calling. Some free-to-play games fall into this category by offering virtual items that can be purchased with real-world money.
- Limited capacity: For example, SQL Server Express is restricted to databases of 10 GB or less.
- Limited use license: Some software is free only for students, educational use, or personal use. For example, Autodesk's Education plan gives eligible students free one-year, single-user access to Autodesk software and services for educational purposes, and CCleaner Free is for home use only.
- Limited use time: Some free-to-play games permit the user to play the game consecutively for a limited number of levels or turns; the player must either wait a period of time to play more or purchase the right to play more.
- Limited support: Priority or real-time technical support may not be available for non-paying users.
- Limited or no access to online services that are only available by purchasing periodic subscriptions.

Some software and services make all of the features available for free for a trial period, and then at the end of that period revert to operating as a feature-limited free version. The user can unlock the premium features on payment of a license fee, as per the freemium model. Some businesses use a variation of the model known as "open core", in which the unsupported, feature-limited free version is also open-source software, but versions with additional features and official support are commercial software.

== Significance ==
In June 2011, PC World reported that traditional anti-virus software had started to lose market share to freemium anti-virus products. By September 2012, all but two of the 50 highest-grossing apps in the Games section of Apple's iTunes App Store supported in-app purchases, leading Wired to conclude that game developers were now required to choose between including such purchases or foregoing a very substantial revenue stream. Beginning in 2013, the digital distribution platform Steam began to add numerous free-to-play and early-access games to its library, many of which utilized freemium marketing for their in-game economies. Due to criticism that the multiplayer games falling under this category were pay-to-win in nature or were low-quality and never finished development, Valve has since added stricter rules to its early-access and free-to-play policies.

== Criticism of freemium games ==
Freemium games have come under criticism from players and critics. Many have been labelled pay-to-win, a term used for systems in which spending can confer gameplay advantages and which has been criticized as unfair. Other criticism has focused on monetization practices in digital games that players perceive as misleading, unfair, or aggressive. Research on free-to-play games has examined mechanisms described as "demand through inconvenience", where perceived inconvenience has been associated with players' purchasing intentions.

In November 2014, the animated TV series South Park aired an episode entitled "Freemium Isn't Free". The episode satirized the business model for encouraging predatory game design tactics based on an improper business model. In 2015, Pokémon Shuffle became available for the Nintendo 3DS family systems as a game that users could start playing for free.

== Freemium monetization strategies ==
=== Tiered subscriptions ===
Some freemium services offer several premium subscription levels aimed at different customer segments.

=== Hybrid ads and in-app purchases ===
Freemium services may generate revenue through advertising, premium subscriptions, or purchases of premium content.

=== Free trials and soft paywalls ===
Some services offer limited access before requiring payment. In news media, this may take the form of a metered or feature-limited paywall, under which users may read a limited amount of content for free before subscribing for broader access. In a forced free trial, a recipient is sent a few issues of a publication without asking before being required to pay a subscription to continue receiving them.

=== User segmentation ===
Research on freemium business models has described the free offering as a way to identify and segment customer groups that may become paying customers, which can lead to more targeted offerings.

== See also ==
- Business models for open-source software
- Crippleware
- Pay-to-play
- Pay what you want
- Shareware
- Threshold pledge system
