= Jerry Colonna (financier) =

American venture capitalist

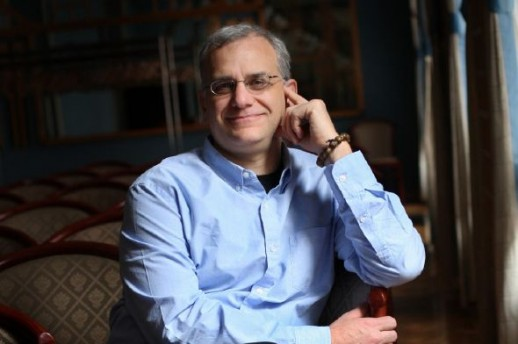
- Born: 1963 (age 62–63)
- Education: Queens College, City University of New York
- Known for: Venture capital, Coaching, The Reboot Podcast
- Website: www.reboot.io

Jerry Colonna (born 1963) is an American venture capitalist and professional coach who played a prominent part in the early development of Silicon Valley. Colonna has been named to Upside magazine's list of the 100 Most Influential People of the New Economy, Forbes ASAP's list of the best VCs in the country, and Worth's list of the 25 most generous young Americans. He is a co-founder and CEO of the executive coaching and leadership development company, Reboot. He is the host of the Reboot Podcast. He also serves as chairman on the Board of Trustees at Naropa University.

== Early life ==
Colonna was raised in Brooklyn. He was 11 years old when his father, a proofreader for a typesetting company, lost his longtime job as computers entered the printing business. After graduating from Edward R. Murrow High School Colonna worked to put himself through Queens College, and was just about to withdraw because he could not afford the tuition when a professor found him a scholarship that included an internship at CMP Media, publisher of Information Week. Colonna went on to graduate with a B.A. in English Literature.

== Career ==
Having taken on the internship, Colonna soon became a success at CMP Media Inc., and by the age of 25 was editor, going on to found the company's interactive group. He left CMP to join his first venture firm, CMG@Ventures L.P., in 1995 as a founding partner. CMG@Ventures L.P. was the first Internet-specific venture firm, and began with a funding pool of $35 million.

With his partner, Fred Wilson, Jerry launched Flatiron Partners in August 1996. Flatiron grew into an investment fund that focused primarily on follow-on investing, with investments in notable dot-com bubble successes and failures, including Alacra, comScore Networks, Yoyodyne, GeoCities, Kozmo.com, New York Times Digital, PlanetOut, Return Path, Gamesville Inc, Scout electromedia, Standard Media International, Starmedia, and VitaminShoppe.com. The firm's 1996 fund capitalized at $150 million with two investors: SOFTBANK Technology Ventures and Chase Capital Partners, the private-equity arm of Chase Manhattan Corp. The firm later raised another fund capitalized at $500 million with Chase Capital Partners as the sole active LP. On July 2, 2001, Colonna was named to the Advisory Board of Silicon Alley Entrepreneurs Club. In 2001 Colonna and Wilson shut down Flatiron.

After working at JPMorgan, Colonna became a business and life coach, serving entrepreneurs and CEOs and in 2007 launched his professional coaching practice. He is currently the CEO of Reboot.io, a coaching company in New York, Boulder, San Francisco. Through his coaching practice, he has continued to be active in tech startup community through both private and group coaching sessions and through many public speaking engagements and he has coached many startup founders, including Dennis Crowley at Foursquare, and Bart Lorang at FullContact.

Colonna is the author of two books Reboot: Leadership and the Art of Growing Up and Reunion: Leadership and the Longing to Belong .
