= Music Boulevard =

Retail music information and sales website

- Founded: 1995
- Defunct: 1999
- Fate: Acquired by CDNow; March 17, 1999
- Headquarters: United States
- Services: Online Retail Music Store

Music Boulevard, or musicblvd.com, was a retail music information and sales website founded in 1995 by Telebase Systems. In 1997 the Music Boulevard website, operated by N2K, became among the first websites to offer piracy-protected music singles for direct download. The website used Liquid Audio's single-delivery system. Originally created as a subsidiary of Telebase Systems by its CEO Jim Coane, N2K's MusicBlvd went public in October 1997. The website offered more than 300,000 music titles and generated more than 80 million views in its first quarter.

In 1998 Music Boulevard was described by The Boston Globe as one of the "big three" online music sellers alongside CDNow and Amazon.com, and it was lauded for its extras including artist biographies, reviews, and feature stories from national music publications. By 1999, the company was ranked 9th among all electronic commerce sites, with around 2.7 million visitors in the month of December. MusicBlvd was also partnered with CBS Cable and hotlinked to sponsors, including Billboard magazine.

On March 17, 1999 MusicBlvd was acquired by CDNow, at which time its website became defunct and customers were redirected to the CDNow website. According to the book The Cdnow Story: Rags to Riches on the Internet, Music Boulevard was CDNow's "number one competitor."

CDnow was acquired by Amazon.com in 2002.
