= N-Coded Music =

Jazz record label

- Parent company: Phase One Network
- Founded: 1997
- Founder: Dave Grusin, Larry Rosen, Phil Ramone
- Defunct: 2005
- Status: Inactive
- Genre: Jazz, vocal jazz, smooth jazz
- Country of origin: U.S.
- Location: New York City
- Official website: Catalog

N-Coded Music was a jazz record label in New York City founded by Dave Grusin, Larry Rosen, and Phil Ramone as N2K Encoded Music in 1997.

Their original business model was to break out new artists and groups from various genres (mainly smooth jazz) by releasing their music through its co-owned online music site, Music Boulevard, in the form of CDs and downloads using the Liquid Audio format. CDs were also distributed by RED Music for the traditional retail market. After Music Boulevard and its main competitor, CDNow merged, N2K Encoded Music was sold to Warlock Records and renamed N-Coded Music.

N-Coded's roster included Ann Hampton Callaway, Jane Monheit, Candy Dulfer, Andy Bey, and Jonathan Butler.
