= FullContact =

American technology company

FullContact Inc.
- Industry: Software
- Founded: Denver, Colorado (2010)
- Founder: Bart Lorang; Travis Todd; Dan Lynn
- Headquarters: Denver, Colorado, U.S.
- Key people: Chris Harrison(CEO)
- Website: fullcontact.com

FullContact Inc. is a privately held technology company that provides a suite of cloud-based software products for businesses, developers, and brands. Their main focus is Identity Resolution: linking users' mobile advertising IDs with their personal data.

FullContact Inc. is headquartered in Denver, Colorado, U.S., and Kochi (India).

== History ==
FullContact was founded in 2010 by Bart Lorang, Travis Todd, and Dan Lynn and went through the Techstars Boulder accelerator in 2011. Over the history of the company, it has raised approximately $50 million in venture-capital financing.

In August 2020, Bart Lorang appointed Chris Harrison to succeed him as CEO.

Ziff Davis purchased all of FullContact’s assets in the fourth quarter of 2024.

== Acquisitions ==
FullContact acquired the Latvian startup company Cobook 2014.

India-based Profoundis Labs Pvt Ltd. was acquired in 2016 along with start-up company Conspire, Inc. A year later, in 2017, the company purchased Mattermark, an aggregator of data about startups and other companies.

In February 2018, FullContact acquired Contacts+, a mobile contact management application. Contacts+ was sold to Benchmark Email in 2021.
