= David Perry (entrepreneur) =

- Education: University of Tulsa; Harvard University
- Occupation: Entrepreneur
- Employer: Indigo Agriculture

David Perry was the CEO and Director of Indigo Agriculture (earlier known as Symbiota), an agricultural technology company headquartered in Boston, United States. He is a serial entrepreneur in the life sciences industry. He has co-founded Anacor Pharmaceuticals, Chemdex, NexPrise, Virogen and FareWell.

In September 2020, he was replaced by Ron Hovsepian, Indigo’s acting chief operating officer. Perry is also leaving the company’s board.

== Early life and education ==
Perry was raised on his family's farm in rural Arkansas. He holds a BS from the University of Tulsa and an MBA from Harvard Business School. He also attended the United States Air Force Academy. He began his career at Exxon, where he managed the operations and maintenance of an oil refinery.

== Career ==
In 1995, while at Harvard Business School, David Perry founded Virogen, a biotechnology company focused on diagnostics.

While at Virogen, he felt that scientists spent a lot of time in procuring life sciences products through conventional catalog ordering. So in 1997, he founded Chemdex, headquartered in California. It is a B2B marketplace focusing on the life-sciences industry and sells laboratory chemicals and other scientific equipments online. In the same year, he also created the parent company of Chemdex, called Ventro Corporation which was later sold to Nexprise. He served as its CEO and President until November 2001.

In 2002, Perry co-founded Anacor Pharmaceuticals and served as its CEO for twelve years. The biopharmaceutical company is focused on developing novel small-molecule therapeutics to treat infectious and inflammatory diseases. In 2016, the company was acquired by Pfizer for $5.4 billion.

In 2015, Perry co-founded Better Therapeutics (also known as FareWell), a digital therapeutics company focused on preventing and reversing chronic disease through lifestyle changes. He is also on the board of directors of the human microbiome company, Evelo Biosciences.

In January 2015, Perry began his now former role as President, Director and CEO of Indigo Agriculture.

== Awards and recognitions ==
- EY Entrepreneur of the Year 2000 – Northern California for Ventro Corporation
- 2017 Pioneering Leader Award by Flagship Pioneering

== See also ==
- Indigo Agriculture
- Geoffrey von Maltzahn
