= Richard Nanula =

American business executive

Richard D. Nanula was chief financial officer of Amgen Inc. and The Walt Disney Company, chief operating officer of Starwood, and chief executive officer of Broadband Sports. While a principal at Colony Capital, he resigned amid a sex scandal.

== Early life ==
Nanula was born to an African American mother and an Italian father. He grew up in Pasadena, California and attended the University of California, Santa Barbara, where he received a bachelor's degree in economics in 1982. He graduated from Harvard Business School in 1986, where he received his M.B.A. He later became a certified public accountant.

== Career ==
Nanula held a variety of executive positions at the Walt Disney Company from 1986 until 1998, including senior executive vice president, chief financial officer (1991-1995, 1996–1997) and president of Disney Stores Worldwide (1995-1996). He was president and chief operating officer for Starwood in New York from 1998 until 1999, then chairman and chief executive officer at Broadband Sports from 1999 until 2001.

Nanula was executive vice president of Amgen Inc. in May 2001 and was appointed chief financial officer in August 2001. On April 10, 2007, Amgen announced that he would be resigning from his position "to pursue other opportunities". On May 4, 2007, it was announced that Nanula had resigned from the Boeing Company's board of directors, where he had served since January 2005.

Announced in January 2008, Nanula joined Colony Capital, LLC, and was responsible for the firm's global operations, with a special focus on operating company transactions. Nanula resigned from Colony in July 2013 amid allegations that involved sex with porn stars.

As of at least February 2021, he is the CEO of PureForm Global, a manufacturer of cannabinoids.

In July 2023, Lucy Scientific Discovery Inc. announced that Nanula had been appointed its CEO and that he would "retain his Chairman role". As of September 2025, the company is no longer in business.

== Personal life ==
Nanula married Tracey Hart, whom he met at Disney, in 1995. They have three children together. In 2005, Hart filed for divorce.

== Sources ==
- Boeing Director Nanula Resigns from Board
- Colony Capital Senior Executives - Richard D. Nanula
- Richard Nanula Exits Colony Capital As Alleged Sex Tape Surfaces
