= Gerry Kearby =

American entrepreneur

Gerald "Gerry" Kearby (June 22, 1947 – August 6, 2012) was an entrepreneur who rose to prominence during the "dot-com" boom of the late 1990s. He worked predominantly with music and audio-related electronics and software companies.

He was co-founder, CEO and president of Liquid Audio, Inc. In that position, he testified before the US Congress regarding digital music distribution. At Liquid Audio he also drove development of digital audio watermarking technology since acquired and used by Microsoft. At its peak, Liquid Audio had a market capitalization close to $1 billion.

Prior to Liquid Audio, Kearby was co-founder and chief executive officer of Integrated Media Systems, a manufacturer of computer-based professional audio equipment from June 1995 to December 1995. From January 1989 until June 1995, Mr. Kearby served as vice president of sales and marketing at Studer Editech Corporation, a professional audio recording division of the Studer company. Kearby created some of the earliest versions of digital audio workstation product families working with many colleagues. Gerry served in the United States Marine Corps as percussionist for their premier ceremonial unit, "The Commandant's Own" in Washington, D.C., between 1967 and 1968.

Kearby died on August 6, 2012, in Pescadero, California.
