= Modo (wireless device) =

Discontinued wireless consumer electronic device

modo
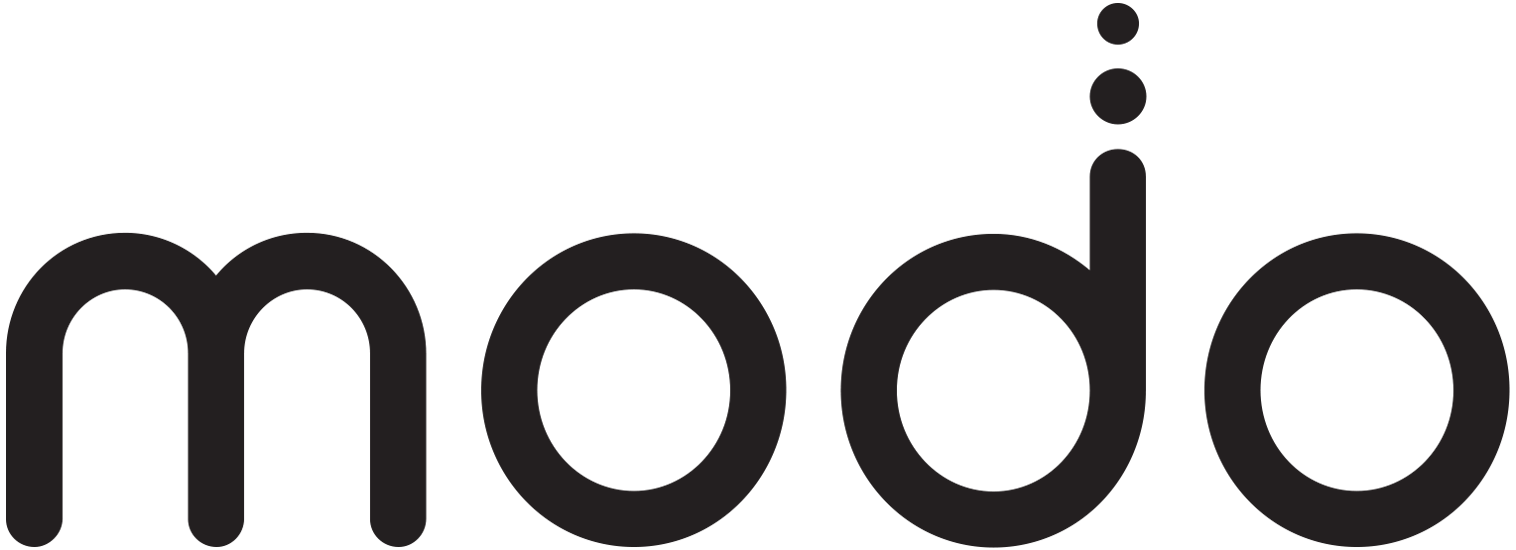
- Developer: Scout Electromedia
- Type: Pager
- Released: September 5, 2000; 25 years ago
- Introductory price: US$99
- Discontinued: October 24, 2000; 25 years ago
- Operating system: modo OS (based on Pixo)
- Storage: Proprietary 2 MB
- Display: 105x140 px monochrome
- Power: 2 × AAA batteries
- Dimensions: 3.5"x2"
- Website: www.scoutelectromedia.com/modo at the Wayback Machine (archived October 18, 2000)
- Language: English

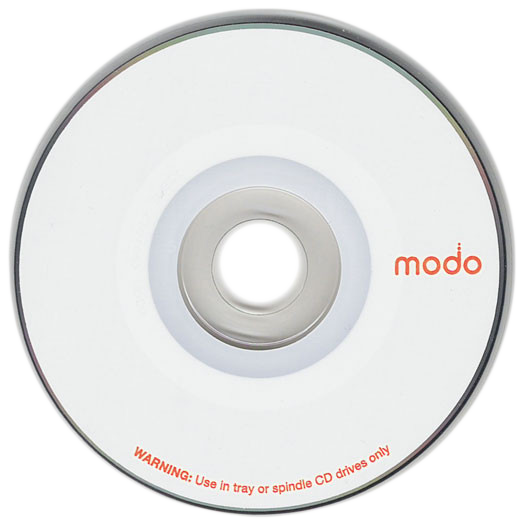
A promotional mini CD that was used as part of Modo's media campaign

Modo (stylized in all lowercase) was a wireless device developed by Scout Electromedia. Utilizing pager networks, the device was designed to provide city-specific "lifestyle" content, such as reviews of restaurants or bars and movie listings, in addition to original curated content by Scout's developers.

Officially announced on August 28, 2000, targeting a "young hipster" urban demographic and a reported $20 million spent on marketing, the Modo was released in September 2000 in two US cities, New York and San Francisco, with plans to roll out in other major urban areas such as Los Angeles and Chicago.

After not receiving additional funding and the firing of one of its chief executives, Geoff Pitfield. Scout Electromedia was liquidated and the Modo, along with its wireless service, was discontinued in October 2000, just one month after its release and one day before its Los Angeles launch. It has been noted as one of the most notorious dot-com bubble failed ventures.

== History ==
After the company was funded, one of its venture backers, Flatiron, backed a similar company, Vindigo, which aimed to bring a broader range of information to the PalmPilot platform. Because of Scout's focus on delivering mobile information to a young design-conscious audience that had no interest in using a traditional PDA, Vindigo was considered by the backers to be a complementary product offering. Scout Electromedia received an estimated $40 million to develop and market the Modo.

The industrial design was done by IDEO (which took an investment in the startup), while the device software was based on Pixo's operating system (the OS that later powered the Apple iPod). All of the electrical engineering, wireless, and system development were done in-house by the company.

The Modo was advertised heavily in its target markets of Los Angeles, New York, Chicago and San Francisco, and was sold online via its website and in retailers such as DKNY and Virgin Megastores. The product was launched in the late summer of 2000 and made it to two of the four planned cities, but only shipped for one day in San Francisco. While the stock sold out, reviews of the device were mixed: while praising the device design and concept, criticisms arose due to its one-way service, its limited city availability, and comparisons to competitors Vindigo and Palm.

On October 20, 2000, Geoff Pitfield, Scout Electromedia's CEO, was fired, and on October 24, 2000, the company was shut down, stopping all developments and service on the Modo. Over time, it came out that the company's venture backers had left the company to die as many of them experienced their own financial problems due to the dot-com bubble (notably Idealab, Flatiron, and Chase Capital).

== See also ==
- Microsoft Kin – another short lived device marketed towards a young adult demographic
