= USinternetworking =

Application service provider

USinternetworking, Inc (USI)
- Founded: January 1998; 28 years ago
- Founders: Christopher R. McCleary; Chris Poelma
- Defunct: October 20, 2006; 20 years ago
- Fate: Acquired by AT&T
- Headquarters: Annapolis, Maryland

USinternetworking, Inc. (USi) was an application service provider. It offered outsourced business applications delivered over the Internet or a private network connection for an installation charge and a flat monthly fee. In October 2006, it was acquired by AT&T.

== History ==
The company was founded in January 1998 by Christopher R. McCleary, Chris Poelma and Stephen McManus

Early investors included Grotech and US West.

In February 1998, the company pursued a merger with PSINet but was rejected.

In May 1998, the company signed a lease for its 24,000 square foot office.

On April 9, 1999, during the dot-com bubble, the company became a public company via an initial public offering. Shares rose 174% on the first day of trading, ending the day at $57.50 per share.

On April 26, 1999, the company was named the first certified Broadvision application service provider.

In November 1999, the company announced an agreement to develop Microsoft Office 2000 as an online service.

In July 2000, founder Christopher R. McCleary resigned as chief executive officer of the company and was replaced with Andrew Stern.

In August 2000, the company acquired EnableVision.

By July 2001, after the bursting of the dot-com bubble, shares were trading for $1 each.

In January 2002, the company filed bankruptcy. It emerged in May 2002 with financing from Bain Capital and a merger with Interpath.

In September 2003, Stephen A. Mucchetti was named chief operating officer of the company.

In June 2004, the company acquired Appshop for between $40 million and $50 million.

In October 2006, AT&T acquired the company for $300 million.
