= Fred Wilson (financier) =

American venture capitalist and blogger

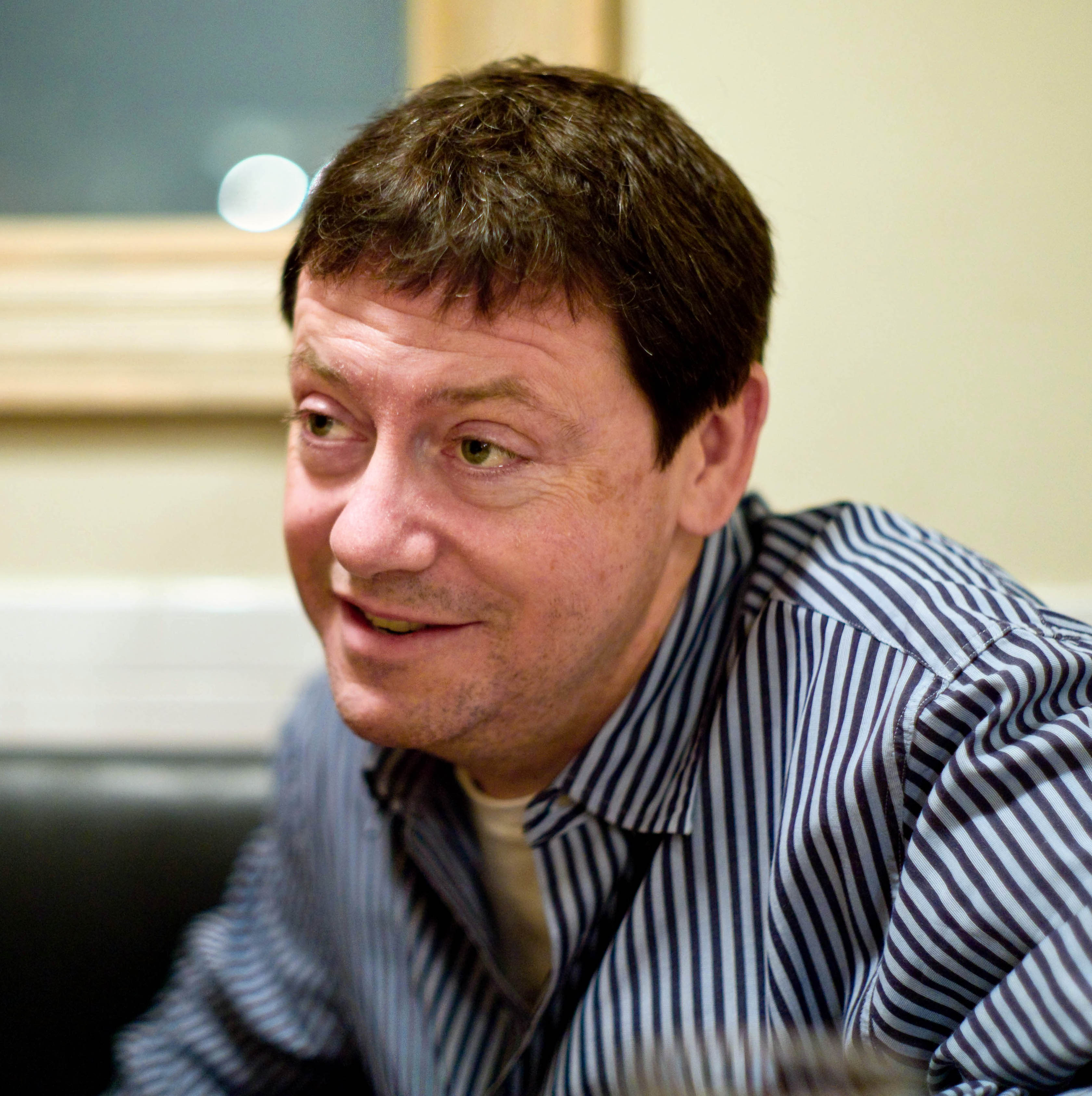
- Wilson in 2009
- Born: August 20, 1961 (age 65)
- Education: Massachusetts Institute of Technology, University of Pennsylvania
- Known for: Blogging, venture capital

Fred Wilson (born August 20, 1961) is an American businessman, venture capitalist and blogger. Wilson is the co-founder of Union Square Ventures, a New York City-based venture capital firm with investments in Web 2.0 companies such as Twitter, Tumblr, Foursquare, Zynga, Kickstarter, Etsy and MongoDB.

== Career ==
Fred Wilson began his career as an associate and then became a General Partner at Euclid Partners. He worked at Euclid Partners from 1987 to 1996.

In 1996 Wilson and Jerry Colonna began Flatiron Partners, which was named after the Flatiron District. Based in New York City, it grew into an investment fund that focused primarily on follow-on investing, with investments in notable dot-com bubble successes and failures, including Alacra, comScore Networks, GeoCities, Kozmo.com, The New York Times Digital, PlanetOut, Return Path, Scout electromedia, Standard Media International, Starmedia, Favemail, and VitaminShoppe.com. The firm's 1996 fund capitalized at $150 million with two investors: SOFTBANK Technology Ventures and Chase Capital Partners, the private-equity arm of Chase Manhattan Corp. The firm later raised another fund capitalized at $500 million with Chase Capital Partners as the sole active LP. In 2001 Wilson and Colonna shut down Flatiron.

In 2004 Wilson and Brad Burnham founded Union Square Ventures. TheFunded.com, a social networking site for technology entrepreneurs, rated him their favorite venture capitalist in 2007.

Wilson was a judge for Mayor Michael Bloomberg's NYC BigApps competition in NYC.

== Blogging ==
Wilson publishes a blog called AVC: musings of a VC in NYC. Wilson publishes one post per day, usually on a topic related to venture capital entrepreneurship or the Internet.

== Personal life ==
Wilson attended high school at James I. O'Neill High School. Wilson is married to Joanne Wilson, a prominent angel investor and author of the Gotham Gal blog. They have three children and live in New York City and Venice Beach. All of his children attended Wesleyan University.

Wilson has a bachelor's degree in Mechanical Engineering from MIT and an MBA from the Wharton School of the University of Pennsylvania.

He is an active philanthropist and community advocate having worked on initiatives including the redevelopment of Union Square and Madison Square in New York City. He is also a board member of DonorsChoose.org, an online charity that connects individuals to classrooms in need. Currently, Wilson is involved in the Pier 40 Partnership.
