= Indigo Agriculture =

American agricultural technology company

- Type: Private
- Industry: Agriculture
- Founded: 2013
- Headquarters: Boston, MA
- Key people: Ron Hovsepian; Geoffrey von Maltzahn
- Website: indigoag.com

Indigo Agriculture is a Boston, Massachusetts-based agricultural technology company that works with plant microbes, aiming to improve yields of cotton, wheat, corn, soybeans, and rice. The company also offers crop storage and other logistics programs for farmers.

David Perry, who had led the company since 2014, was replaced as CEO by Ron Hovsepian in September 2020. Perry also left the company’s board.

== History and funding ==
In 2013, Indigo was founded as Symbiota by Noubar Afeyan and Geoffrey von Maltzahn through Flagship Pioneering partners David Berry and Ignacio Martinez, led by former CEO David Perry, as a company developing environmentally friendly microbes that could be applied to seeds to produce better yielding crops. In February 2016, the company rebranded as Indigo Agriculture.

The company raised over $300 million in venture capital funding, with help from investors Flagship Pioneering, the Alaska Permanent Fund, Baillie Gifford, the Investment Corporation of Dubai, and Activant Capital. Indigo’s Series D in 2016 was noted to be the largest private equity financing in the agricultural technology sector.

In September 2017, the company raised US$156 million, giving it a total valuation of US$1.4 billion and making it a "unicorn", the term given to start-ups worth more than US$1 billion. In September 2018, Indigo closed its Series E funding, bringing in $250 million. Later in 2018, Indigo acquired satellite startup TellusLabs, which had been using satellite imaging and geospatial intelligence to create a living map of the world’s food supply.

Indigo was named the top company of CNBC’s 2019 Disruptor 50 list. In 2020, Indigo raised $500 million from investors including FedEx and the Alaska Permanent Fund, and had a valuation of $3.5 billion. In 2020, Moderna CEO Stéphane Bancel joined Indigo’s board of directors.

In August 2023, reports from the Israeli R&D partnership Unic-Tech indicated that after a recent round of funding, Indigo's valuation was down to just $200 million. This is a 94% drop from the $3.5 billion at which it was valued two years ago.

== Products and services ==
Indigo's seed treatments contain microbes that live within plant tissue, unlike existing microbial seed treatments that contain microbes that live around the roots. The first product, Indigo Cotton, a seed treatment containing bacteria isolated from cotton plants that is intended to improve yields under drought conditions was launched in July 2016. By 2018 the company has also launched similar seed treatments to improve drought resistance in wheat, corn, soybeans, rice, and barley.

In the United States, Indigo connects growers to buyers and assists with the logistics of shipping their crops. In 2017, the first year this model was implemented, Indigo contracted approximately half a million acres in cotton, wheat, corn, soy, and rice. In 2019, Indigo announced a project to create carbon credits by measuring the carbon that farm fields have in their soil, selling those credits to companies who want to reduce their carbon footprint.

Indigo has also expanded its business beyond biological seed treatments by using digital technology to connect farmers with markets and support more sustainable farming practices. In 2018, the company launched Indigo Marketplace, a digital platform that connects growers directly with buyers and allows crops to be sold according to characteristics such as quality, variety, and production methods. This was part of Indigo's wider strategy of combining agricultural science, technology, and market access to improve farmer profitability..

Internationally, Indigo has maintained a presence in Brazil, their first product being microbial seed treatment for soybeans, having yield tests that resulted in significant productivity increases of 3% to 8%. Indigo has also worked with EMBRAPA and other large farms around Brazil. In Europe, Indigo has created a Carbon credits program in Germany, working with German company Beiselen.

Indigo has secured carbon commitments from major companies through its carbon credit program, Indigo Carbon. Some of those companies include Boston Consulting Group, Shopify, Barclays, JPMorgan Chase and IBM. Indigo worked with the Climate Action Reserve and Verra to publish protocols, creating guidance for the program.

=== Partnerships ===
Working with Corteva, Indigo was able to offer farmers close to $15 an acre for shifting to practices that pollute less, use fewer chemicals, or farm crops that pull carbon from the atmosphere through the Corteva Carbon Initiative.

==== Food and drink ====
Indigo has previously partnered with Anheuser-Busch, having sold 2.2 million bushels of rice coming from growers contracted to produce crops that use 10 percent less water and nitrogen than the average, and save at least 10 percent on greenhouse gas emissions compared to state benchmarks. Indigo has also collaborated with Dogfish Head Brewery via Indigo Carbon, creating a traceably sourced beer using sustainable wheat grown using regenerative farming, called Re-Gen-Ale.

==== Clothing ====
In February 2021, the VF Corporation partnered with Indigo to source regenerative cotton for use in The North Face products.
