= Christopher Chen (academic) =

American biological engineer

Christopher S. Chen
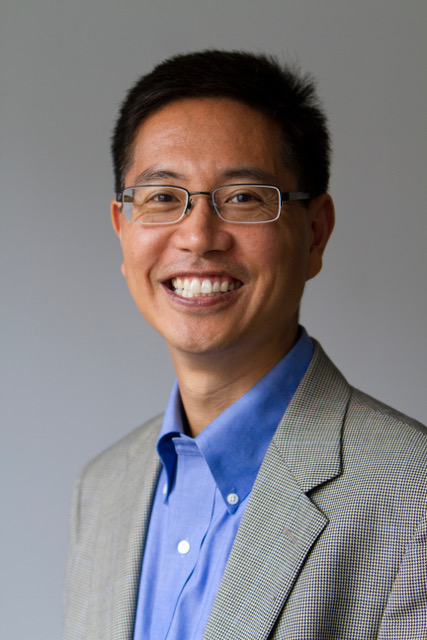
- Born: 1968 (age 57–58); America
- Occupations: Biological engineer, researcher and academic
- Known for: Contributions in tissue engineering, cellular microenvironments, and mechanobiology
- Title: William Fairfield Warren Distinguished Professor of Biomedical Engineering
- Awards: The Mary Hulman George Award for Biomedical Research; The Herbert W. Dickerman Award for Outstanding Contribution to Science; The Charles DeLisi Lecture Award

Academic background
- Education: Harvard University (B.A.); Massachusetts Institute of Technology (M.S., Ph.D.); Harvard Medical School (M.D.)

Academic work
- Institutions: Boston University (2013 - ) Harvard University (2013 - ) University of Pennsylvania (2004-2013); Johns Hopkins University (1999-2004)

Christopher S. Chen (born 1968) is an American biological engineer. He is the William Fairfield Warren Distinguished Professor of Biomedical Engineering at Boston University and member of the Wyss Institute for Biologically Inspired Engineering at Harvard University in Boston.

Chen has published over 250 research papers. His research investigates the application of engineering principles to control tissue assembly, repair and regeneration, and incorporates areas including nanotechnology, tissue engineering, engineered cellular micro-environments, micro-electromechanical systems and micro-fabrication technologies.

Chen has been awarded numerous awards and distinctions such as ONR Young Investigator Award in 1999, the Presidential Early Career Award for Scientists and Engineers (PECASE) in 2000,

== Education ==
Chen completed his Bachelor's in Biochemistry from Harvard University in 1990, where he conducted research on integrin receptors and biomechanics of running. After spending a year abroad, he joined Massachusetts Institute of Technology and completed his Master's in Mechanical Engineering in 1993. He then joined the M.D.-Ph.D. program run by the Harvard-MIT Division of Health Sciences and Technology (HST). He completed his dissertation research with Donald E. Ingber and George M. Whitesides on "Engineering the adhesion of cells to substrates", and received a Ph.D. in 1997 and an M.D. in 1999.

== Career ==
Chen joined the faculty of Johns Hopkins University as an Assistant Professor in Biomedical Engineering and in Oncology in 1999. In 2004, he moved to the University of Pennsylvania, where he served as the inaugural J. Peter Skirkanich Professor of Innovation in Bioengineering, founded and directed the Penn Center for Engineering Cells and Regeneration, and was a founding member of the Penn Institute for Regenerative Medicine. In 2013, Chen joined Boston University as Distinguished Professor of Biomedical Engineering and the Wyss Institute for Biologically Inspired Engineering at Harvard University. In 2019, he was appointed the William Fairfield Warren Distinguished Professor of Biomedical Engineering at Boston University, the highest distinction bestowed upon senior faculty members at Boston University.

Chen has been a member of numerous advisory boards, committees and review groups of organizations such as the Society for BioMEMS and Biomedical Nanotechnology, the United States Office of the Under Secretary of Defense, Defense Sciences Research Council, and Faculty of 1000 Biology. Chen also holds several leadership positions at the interface of engineering, biology, and medicine, including the founding Director of the Boston University Biological Design Center, the Deputy Director of a National Science Foundation Engineering Research Center focused on integrating nanomanufacturing, cellular engineering, and regenerative methods to create personalized fully functionalized heart tissue, and co-Principal Investigator on the National Science Foundation Science and Technology Center on Engineering Mechanobiology.

Chen has served as Editor or Editorial Board member for numerous scientific journals, including Science Translational Medicine, Developmental Cell, Cell Stem Cell, Annual Reviews in Cell and Developmental Biology, Cell and Molecular Bioengineering, Technology, and Journal of Cell Science.

== Research and work ==
Most of Chen's work is at the interdisciplinary research interface between engineering, biology, and medicine. Chen's main areas of research is in the field of tissue engineering and regenerative medicine, where he has made contributions in cellular microenvironments, tissue assembly, and vascular biology. Throughout these studies, he has worked on the development of microelectromechanical systems (MEMS) and nanotechnologies to reveal how cellular organization, mechanics, and adhesive interactions control cellular function.

=== Cellular microenvironments ===
One of Chen's major research areas is on the interactions of cells with their surrounding microenvironment. He has articulated that not only biochemical, but also physical cues, stimulate signaling that directs cellular behaviors. His published works have highlighted the importance of cellular adhesion to surrounding extracellular matrix scaffold, adhesion to neighboring cells, and forces transmitted through those adhesions in regulating responses such as cell proliferation, stem cell differentiation, and multicellular organization. He has developed microfabrication and nanotechnology approaches to show how the geometric patterns of adhesive interactions, and whether those interactions are planar or in three-dimensional space, can dramatically impact how cells respond. In defining a role for mechanical forces in these events, he has described the development of several technologies to measure these cellular forces.

=== Tissue assembly ===
Chen has used his insights in cellular microenvironments to develop strategies to engineer tissue assembly. He has advocated that these synthetic tissues can serve not only as implantable therapies but also as surrogates of human tissues in pharmaceutical and translational research. Chen has demonstrated how the shape of multicellular aggregates can be used to direct patterns of bone versus fat differentiation in engineered tissues. His works report the use of microposts as physical anchors to guide the formation of aligned micro-scale tissues, and has used these systems to build tissue mimetics of stroma, skeletal muscle, airway and vessel muscles, and cardiac tissue. Chen also has reported on the development of microfluidic platforms where cells line perfusable channels, including 3D printing techniques to create a framework for a synthetic vascular system that consists of a lattice of sugar, with the goal of supporting larger tissue structures such as an artificial heart or liver. He has used these to model capillary vascular beds that can feed a 3-dimensional culture in the same way that blood vessels feed a tissue, as well as other luminal tissues such as bile ducts. He has used these vascular models to study cellular interactions with vasculature, most notably in cancer.

=== Vascular biology ===
Chen's scientific work has led to new insights in the biology of the blood vasculature. Chen published an article in 2016 about forces in vascular biology. His research concludes that there is a significant effect of environmental and cell-generated forces on endothelial behavior, and he proposed new concepts about endothelial force sensing and mechanical signaling. In his own studies, he has reported on the importance of the physical properties of the extracellular matrix, cellular interactions with matrix and other cells, and mechanical forces in impacting how endothelial cells signal and organize to form vascular networks. He discovered a role for tugging forces at cell-cell junctions and shear stresses of blood flow in regulating the barrier between blood and tissue compartments. In addition to fundamental studies in vascular biology, Chen has also advanced numerous technologies to promote vascularization for treating ischemic diseases and engraftment of engineered tissues. He has shown that pre-templating vascular cords and channels within artificial grafts leads to rapid vascularization and perfusion of such grafts upon implantation.

== Awards and honors ==
- 1999 - ONR Young Investigator Award
- 2000 - Presidential Early Career Award for Scientists and Engineers
- 2002 - The Mary Hulman George Award for Biomedical Research
- 2004 - The Herbert W. Dickerman Award for Outstanding Contribution to Science
- 2006 - Member, Faculty of 1000 Biology
- 2010 - The George H. Heilmeier Faculty Award for Excellence in Research
- 2018 - Dean's Catalyst Award
- 2019 - The Charles DeLisi Lecture Award
- 2019 - Robert A. Pritzker Distinguished Lecture Award, The Biomedical Engineering Society

== Selected articles ==
- Chen, C.S., Mrksich, M., Huang, S., Whitesides, G.M., Ingber, D.E. (1997) Geometric control of cell life and death. Science. 276:1425-1428.
- Tan, J.L., Tien, J., Pirone, D., Gray, D.S., Chen, C.S. (2003) Cells lying on a bed of microneedles: An approach to isolate mechanical force. Proc. Natl. Acad. Sci. U.S.A. 100: 1484-1489.
- McBeath, R., Pirone, D., Nelson, C.M., Bhadriraju, K., Chen, C.S. (2004) Cell shape, cytoskeletal tension, and RhoA regulate stem cell lineage commitment. Development Cell. 6: 483-495.
- Guilak F., Cohen D.M., Estes B.T., Gimble J.M., Liedtke W., Chen, C.S. (2009) Control of stem cell fate by physical interactions with the extracellular matrix. Cell Stem Cell 5: 17-26.
- Grashoff, C., Hoffman, B.D., Brenner, M.D., Zhou, R., Parsons, M., Yang, M.T., McLean, M.A., Sligar, S.G., Chen, C.S., Ha, T., Schwartz, M.A. (2010) Measuring Mechanical Tension across Vinculin Reveals Regulation of Focal Adhesion Dynamics. Nature. 466: 263-267.
- Miller, J.S., Stevens, K.R., Yang, M.T., Baker, B.M., Nguyen, D.H., Cohen, D.M., Toro, E., Chen, A.A., Galie, P.A., Yu, X., Chaturvedi, R., Bhatia, S.N., Chen, C.S. (2012) Rapid casting of patterned vascular networks for perfusable engineered three-dimensional tissues. Nature Materials. 11: 768- 774.
- Hinson, J.T., Chopra, A., Nafissi, N., Polacheck, W.J., Benson, C.C., Swist, S., Gorham, J., Yang, L., Schafer, S., Sheng, C.C., Haghighi, A., Homsy, J., Hubner, N., Church, G., Cook, A.S., Linke, W.A., Chen, C.S. Seidman, J.G., Seidman, C.E. (2015) Titin mutations in iPS cells define sarcomere insufficiency as a cause of dilated cardiomyopathy. Science 349(6251):982-986.
- Baker, B.M., Trappmann, B., Wang, W.Y., Sakar, M.S., Kim, I.L., Shenoy, V.B., Burdick, J.A., Chen, C.S. (2015) Cell-mediated fibre recruitment drives extracellular matrix mechanosensing in engineered fibrillar microenvironments. Nat. Mater. 14(12):1262-1268.
- Polacheck, W.J., Kutys, M.L., Yang, J., Eyckmans, J., Wu, Y., Vasavada, H., Hirschi, K.K., Chen, C.S. (2017) A non-canonical Notch complex regulates adherens junctions and vascular barrier function. Nature. 552(7684):258-262.
- Mirabella, T., MacArthur, J.W., Cheng, D., Ozaki, C.K., Woo, Y.J., Yang, M.T., Chen, C.S. (2017) 3D-printed vascular networks direct therapeutic angiogenesis in ischaemia. Nat. Biomed. Eng. 1(83) doi:10.1038/s41551-017-0083.
