= CyberRebate =

Cyberrebate.com, Inc. was an online retailer founded in May 1998 that went bankrupt in May 2001, after the collapse of the dot-com bubble. The company sold items at inflated prices over what a consumer could find similar items for at competing vendors, as much as 10 times the list price in some cases, but offered customers up to a 100% rebate. The business model depended on at least some customers neglecting to apply for the rebate.

== History ==
Joel Granik, Joseph Lichter and Athan Vadiakas started the website on May 16, 1998. By November 2000, the company claimed to have rebated $39 million to its customers.

In January 2001, it was the third–ranked online retailer in the United States and had 7.7 million web users per month.

The company filed for bankruptcy protection under Chapter 11, Title 11, United States Code on 16 May 2001, citing $83.3 million in liabilities and $24.5 million in assets. Approximately $80 million was due directly to customers in unpaid rebates. At the time of the bankruptcy filing, there were 9 customers that were due pending rebates of $79,000-$100,000 each.

In April 2005, some creditors were awarded $0.08802 per dollar of allowed claims. A second, final disbursement was made to creditors in August 2006 for $0.0006276 per dollar of allowed claims, or roughly $1 for every $1,600 claimed.

Joel Granik then went on to create a Long Island title company, Unlimited Abstract with the money he and his Cyber Rebate founders had obtained from fraudulent activities of Cyber Rebate. He often would receive threatening calls at the office regarding rebates and how to obtain their money back from this.

He then went on to Floating Lotus in 2015, they are NYC’s first sensory deprivation center. He then rebranded under FloLo Holistic after studying Eastern medicine. He claims to have been a Chinese Medicine doctor and a rabbi previously before discovering floating deprivation and a holistic lifestyle.
