= Christopher R. McCleary =

American businessman

Christopher R. McCleary (Chris McCleary) is a technology entrepreneur best known as the founder of former application service provider company USinternetworking, Inc (USi). He is the Managing Director and Chief Financial Officer at the Blue Chip Venture Company, a venture capital firm headquartered in Ohio.

== Early life ==
He was born September 12, 1952, in Geneva, Illinois. His father, Robert McCleary, was a research engineer with USG Corporation, and his mother, Gloria McCleary, was a real estate agent with Century 21. McCleary is a graduate of the University of Kentucky.

== Business ventures ==
=== Laux Communications ===
McCleary was the President of Laux Communications, Inc. The company was later merged into Radiation Systems, Inc.

=== Digex, Inc ===
McCleary was the chairman and chief executive officer of Digex, a national internet service provider. He took over CEO duties at Digex in 1996 before leaving in 1998 to launch USI in Annapolis, Maryland. In 1997, Digex acquired Intermedia Communications, a business telecommunications company in Tampa, Florida.

=== USinternetworking ===
In 1998, McCleary founded USinternetworking, the world's first cloud computing company. After its launch, during its first 18 months, USI raised nearly $500 million from investors. McCleary was featured on the cover of Forbes Magazine as re-writing the ‘Rules of the Web’. McCleary stepped down as CEO in July 2000 to focus on issues surrounding his family, but retained his position of chairman of the board. A preplanned restructuring lead to the firm being acquired by Bain Capital, Inc. Bain Capital later sold it to AT&T for $300 million.

McCleary later stated that "his one regret is not having fought harder to save USi", but that it would not have been possible due to his family issues and the collapse of the World Trade Center all occurring at the same time. USi still runs today as part of IBM.

=== Evergreen Assurance ===
In 2003, after reframing his position at USi, McCleary founded Evergreen Assurance in Baltimore, Maryland. Evergreen was a platform to assist businesses in recovering email and digital records in the event of a disaster. Evergreen was acquired by its competitor, MessageOne, in 2004 for 50 million dollars. Since leaving Evergreen, McCleary has served on the board of directors of several tech companies.

=== Other positions ===
In 2000, McCleary was the chair of an advisory board of tech executives that helped the then Maryland Governor, Parris Glendening to launch his e-commerce initiatives for the 2000 legislative session.

In 2006, McCleary was appointed the director of Blue Chip Venture Company. Blue Chip had previously invested in Digex, USI, and Evergreen Assurance. In September 2006, McCleary was elected chairman of the board for Radware. In 2008, McCleary joined the board of directors of Hosting.com, a managed services and colocation provider.

McCleary serves on the board of Baltimore Emerging Technology Center business incubator and as chairman of the investment committee. He is a member of the board of directors of the State of Maryland Venture Fund. McCleary has served on the board of trustees of Anne Arundel Community College in Annapolis Maryland.

== Awards and recognition ==
McCleary was featured on the cover of Forbes Magazine as one of the tech titans who was credited with “re-writing the rules of the Web”.

McCleary was awarded the Ernst and Young Entrepreneur of the Year Award for Software in 2000 and Washington Post Newsweek Corporate Citizen of the Year 2000.

In 1999, the Annapolis and Arundel County Chamber of Commerce awarded McCleary with Arnie C.Gay Service Award for his nourishing business in the county.
