= Broadband Sports =

Broadband Sports was originally founded in 1998, later becoming a high-flying dotcom-era network of sports-content Web sites that raised over $60 million before shutting down in February 2001.

A new company with the same name and domain was launched in November 2005, which was based in Seattle, Washington and allowed users to upload, view and share both professional and user-generated sports media, covering over 20 sports. Its focus was to allow sports fans and athletes alike to connect directly via a community of fellow enthusiasts. It later went out of business. It shared no relationship to the failed dot-com company that shut down in 2001.

== Overview ==
Broadband Sports was originally a high-flying dotcom-era network of sports-content Web sites that raised over $60 million before going bust in February 2001. The Santa Monica, Calif.-based company originally started out as Athlete Direct ("AD"), that served as the host of 350 official web sites for such athletes as Troy Aikman, Kobe Bryant, Kevin Garnett, Brett Favre, Mia Hamm, Eric Karros, and Anna Kournikova. It later acquired RotoNews.com (now RotoWire.com), a leading fantasy sports web site and Pro Sports Exchange, a network of sports content from newspaper beat writers.

In 2005, the Broadbandsports.com domain was re-launched, by Greg Prosl, a founder of MountainZone.com.

== History ==
The company was founded in 1998 by Tyler J. Goldman and had several well-known, deep-pocketed investors such as Michael Dell, the founder of Dell Computer, Frank J. Biondi Jr., the former chief executive of Universal Studios and Sequoia Capital. Goldman, currently the CEO of Buzznet.com, was one of five members of Steinberg & Moorad, the country's preeminent sports law firm, where he led the firm's media and investment initiatives prior to launching Athlete Direct. In February 1998, the company (then known as E-Sport) secured an investment of $4.5 mm from NMSS Partners. The agreement was signed by Goldman, Ross Schaufelberger and Michael Scharnagl on behalf of E-Sport, and Ahmed O. Alfi on behalf of NMSS Partners, LLC.

In the early stages of Athlete Direct's growth, the company also focused its energies on developing strong online communities around their athletes. Troy Aikman, then the quarterback for the Dallas Cowboys, made unannounced visits to the AOL Athlete Direct chat room to interact with community members. Elliott Gordon, who resigned from AOL Sports to become a founding employee of Athlete Direct, cultivated what was arguably at the time the largest motorsports community section on AOL – the AD NASCAR Family – where NASCAR drivers such as Michael Waltrip occasionally visited. Following AD, Gordon was Director of Programming for NASCAR.COM through 2006 and currently works for Turner Broadcasting.

On September 2, 1999, Yahoo! Inc. announced an agreement with Athlete Direct to bring professional athletes to their users. Through the Yahoo! Sports All-Star Club fans could connect to athletes' official clubs and stores as well as learn about upcoming athlete events, including chats, interviews, and appearances. Additional athletes that joined Brett Favre and Karl Malone in the Yahoo! Sports All-Star Club included NBA players Donyell Marshall and Chris Webber; NFL players Drew Bledsoe, John Mobley and Ricky Watters; NHL players Ed Belfour, Sergei Fedorov and Teemu Selanne; MLB players Tom Glavine, Shawn Green, A.J. Hinch, Trevor Hoffman, and Ivan Rodriguez; Wimbledon tennis champion Jana Novotna and tennis star Anna Kournikova; and NASCAR drivers Ward Burton and Michael Waltrip.

By the late 1990s, Athlete Direct had acquired the digital rights for more than 250 athletes, which essentially became a portal site for "jock blogging." For example, after tossing a bat at Mike Piazza during the 2000 World Series, Roger Clemens stiffed reporters in the locker room following the game but offered a full explanation on his web site. When Albert Belle refused to grant press interviews, media outlets like the Washington Post and ESPN.com had to use his journal postings for quotes in their articles – as illustrated by a note Belle posted in his locker to reporters in 1999: "If you want an interview, check my Web site."

Richard Nanula was hired as chairman and chief executive in October 1999 after he resigned as president and chief operating officer of Starwood Hotels and Resorts Worldwide Inc.

Nancy Kerrigan, arguably the most prominent figure skater of the 1990s, announced her association with Athlete Direct in November 1999. "I am proud to be associated with Athlete Direct because it is the No. 1 choice in online sports entertainment. This relationship will allow me to expand my interaction with skating fans worldwide," said Kerrigan.

At its height in November 1999, Broadband Sports offered $53 million in stock for Stats, Inc., an offer that was seriously considered before owner John Dewan sold the company to News Corporation.

By December 1999, Athlete Direct expanded its influence in the digital media space through a strategic relationship with eBay Inc. eBay launched regional sites and in partnership with Athlete Direct, consumers could bid on equipment from local sports stars with the proceeds of these sales being donated to the athlete's sponsored charity.

Come November 20, 2000, Broadband Sports and ESPN had teamed up to jointly create and program a new Athletes Channel on ESPN.com. However, this relationship was short-lived, as Broadband Sports closed its doors on February 16, 2001. Despite raising $20 million in the company's final year and proclaiming in September publicly that the company was financially stable and didn't need an IPO, the company shut down and dismissed 160 employees just five months later.

Following the demise of Broadband Sports, athletes such as NASCAR driver Ward Burton sued under the ICANN Policy to obtain ownership of their respective domain names.

== Sources ==
- Yahoo! and Athlete Direct Team to Put Sports Stars at Users' Online Doorsteps
- To avoid the press, pro athletes turn to the Web.
- Ward Burton vs. Athlete Direct
- "Athlete Direct to Create Official Web Site For Garciaparra". Business Wire. January 20, 2000.
- Athlete Direct Launches Official Nancy Kerrigan Web Site
- Belle to Press: Talk to the Web!
- History of NASCAR Family Chat on AOL
- eBay Launches 23 Sites, Adds Pro Sports
- "History of NASCAR Family Chat on AOL". Insight on the News. 16 (17). Archived from the original on May 19, 2006 – via FindArticles.
- Players and Fans Ponder Net Worth
- Broadband Sports Prospectus Summary
- ESPN.com and Broadband Sports Team up for Athletes Channel
- Buzznet Names Internet Veteran Tyler Goldman as CEO to Continue Driving Substantial Growth
- Sports world reaches out, helps Virginia Tech cope (by Elliott Gordon)
