= Simone Schürle-Finke =

German biomedical engineer

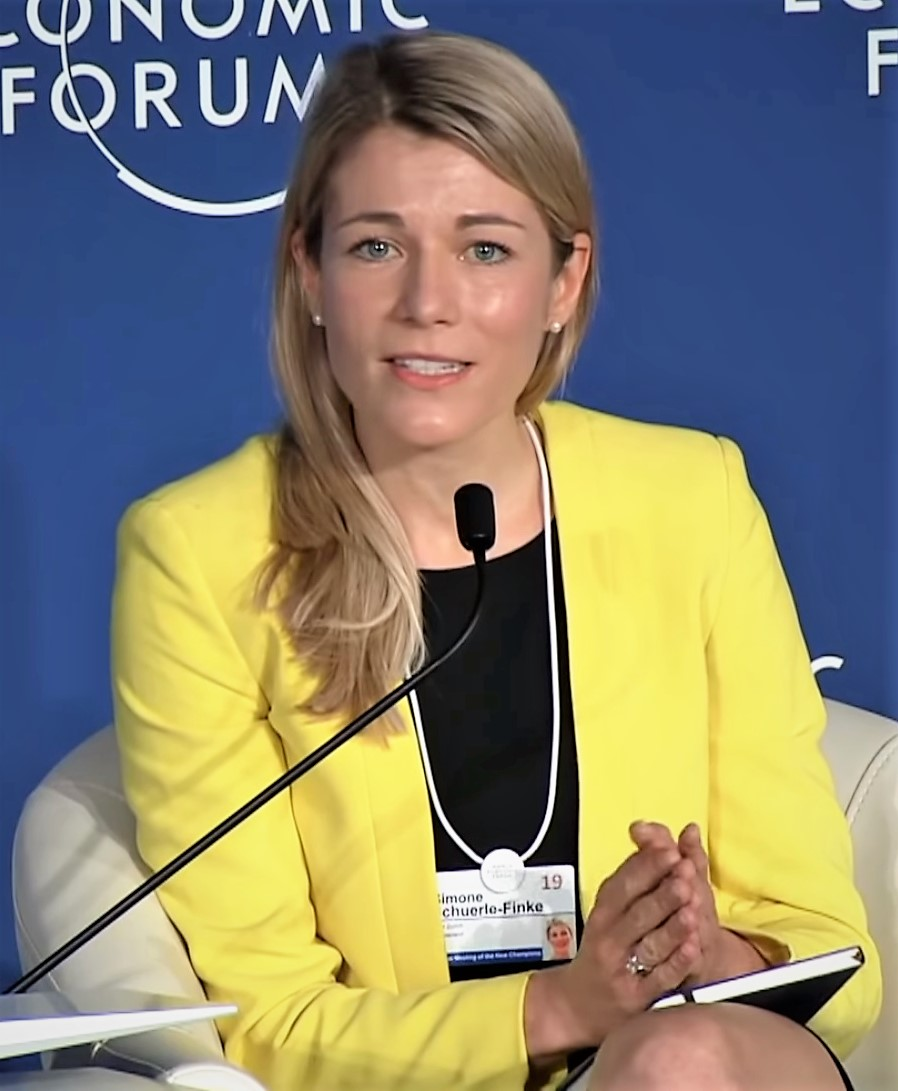
- Schuerle-Finke at the World Economic Forum in 2019
- Born: April 16, 1986 (age 40); Ulm, Germany
- Education: Karlsruhe Institute of Technology, Swiss Federal Institute of Technology
- Known for: Developing microrobots and servoing systems for applications in medical diagnostics and therapeutics
- Scientific career
- Fields: Biomedical engineering, nanotechnology and robotics
- Workplaces: Swiss Federal Institute of Technology in Zürich

Simone Schürle-Finke (born April 16, 1986 in Ulm, Germany) is a German biomedical engineer, professor, and Principal Investigator for the Responsive Biomedical Systems Laboratory in Switzerland. Schürle is a pioneer in nanorobotic and magnetic servoing technologies.

== Education ==
In 2003, Schürle pursued her post-secondary academic studies at the Karlsruhe Institute of Technology (KIT) in Karlsruhe, Germany. During her studies, Schürle travelled abroad to learn techniques and apply her expertise in engineering at two international institutes, funded by the Heinrich Hertz Fellowship and a German State scholarship. Schürle first conducted research in bioengineering at the University of Canterbury in Christchurch, New Zealand. She studied automated drug infusion and control, completing her project in 2006. She then travelled to Kyoto University in Japan in where she worked in the Nano/Micro System Laboratory learning the fundamentals of building and applying carbon nanotube based sensors to biomedical application. After completing her studies in Japan in 2008, Schürle returned to Germany to complete additional courses and research and received her M.Sc. in industrial engineering and management from KIT by 2009.

Following her master's, Schürle pursued her Ph.D. at the Swiss Federal Institute of Technology, in Zurich (ETHZ) within the Institute of Robotics and Intelligent Systems. While at ETHZ, Schürle explored the use of magnetic manipulation as a means to control wireless, nanoscale robots for biomedical diagnostic and therapeutic tools and devices. Schürle completed her PhD work in 2014, receiving recognition for her thesis work on magnetic manipulation techniques.

== Career ==
Schürle pursued postdoctoral studies at the Koch Institute at the Massachusetts Institute of Technology in Cambridge, Massachusetts. While at the Koch, Schürle explored the use of nanosensors in tumor profiling and drug transport to tumors. Schürle completed her postdoctoral work in 2017.

In 2017, Schürle became a tenure track assistant professor at ETH Zürich for Responsive Biomedical Systems. The Responsive Biomedical Systems Laboratory, which Schürle is the Principal Investigator of, is a part of the Institute of Translational Medicine which was founded in 2017 right before her arrival. The goal of the institute is to walk the line between the laboratory and the clinic to move science into treatments and diagnostics as quickly as possible. In the Responsive Biomedical Systems Lab, Schürle leads a research program with a goal of exploring the cellular basis of disease and designing innovative nano- and micro-scale tools to diagnose disease and target disease processes.

Schürle is an Expert Advisory Board Member of the Singularity Group, directing investors towards the most promising future technologies. Schürle also serves on the Global Future Council on the Future of Human Enhancement for the World Economics Forum. Schürle is also an advocate for women in STEM and for improving the culture of academia. She advocates for science to be done in multidisciplinary teams, not in individual silos.

== Research ==
=== Magnetic control methods and microstructure design ===
In her graduate work, Schürle used her expertise from her undergraduate experience in Kyoto to fabricate innovative ways to mechanically characterize the properties of carbon nanotubes (CTN) and their interfaces with other substances. Since transmission electron microscopes (TEM) are often used to observe the characteristics of novel CNTs, Schürle and her colleagues designed a fabrication technique for TEM compatible devices with which to image CNT-metal contact strength. The device design allows them to observe failures in CNT technology, such as when the CNT-metal contacts slip, which will inform future fabrication of CNTs for use in miniaturized devices.

Following this development, Schürle designed a method of servoing magnetic nanostructures through magnetic fields, essentially developing a magnet-based system that can control the pose and motion of objects at the nanoscale. Their system has critical applications to translational medicine as controlled servoing is critical to designing and implementing magnetic drug carrier technology and targeting it to cancer cells.

=== Nano- and microscale sensors and robotics ===
While at M.I.T, Schürle worked towards designing in vivo nanotools that enabled diagnosis and characterization of the tumor microenvironment. Since the first step in targeted tumor treatment is a precise diagnosis of the specific biology of the tumor and is microenvironment, Schürle began designing a system that allowed specific control and delivery of protease-activity nanosensors via alternating magnetic fields. The nanosensors were delivered to the body, unveiled at the tumor site via heat activation, and the protein contents in the particle were dissipated leading to a reaction with a detectable by-product in the urine for quantification and diagnostic information. Schürle and her colleagues validated the technology in mouse models of human colorectal cancer to successfully assess tumor activity.

Schürle and her colleagues then published a pivotal paper, highlighting their design of a robotic technology capable of measuring the mechanobiological properties of cellular behavior. They designed a microrobotic probe that mimicked bacteria, such that they could characterize the attack profiles of macrophages, phagocytic innate immune cells, as they hunt and engulf bacteria. Since Schürle and her colleagues were able to dynamically control the translational and rotational movements of the robots, they could assess how macrophage attack strategies differ for different translation and rotational prey dynamics. The 5-degree of freedom magnetic tweezer system allowed for the dynamic control of robotic movement. Schürle subsequently co-founded a company, called Magnebotix, based on this technology. Magnebotix develops a range of nanorobotic technologies for applications in biological systems such as crystal capture and dissection of the mechanobiology of various cells and tissues in vivo.

Schürle continues to develop innovative robotic tools, based on biological systems, designed for targeted drug delivery. In 2019, Schürle and her colleagues developed two new types of micropropellers that enhance the ease of nanoparticles transport through blood vessels and into tissues. The first structure is an artificial bacterial flagellum and the second is a swarm of living magnetotactic bacteria to create a fluif stream to propel the transport of nanoparticles. These innovative means of drug delivery, harnessing already established biological architecture and living biology, will enhance advancement towards effective targeted drug delivery platforms in patients.

== Awards and honors ==
- 2020 KITE Award
- 2016 Branco Weiss Fellowship - Society and Science
- 2014 ETH Zurich Medal for distinguished doctoral thesis
- 2014 Postdoctoral Research Fellowship from the German Academic Exchange Service (DAAD)
- 2014 Early Postdoctoral Mobility Fellowship from the Swiss National Science Foundation
- 2014 Best Medical Paper Award, Co-Author, IEEE International Conference on Robot Automation
- 2008 Heinrich-Hertz Research Scholarship, Germany
- 2008 Baden-Württemberg scholarship from the State B.-W. Foundation
- 2003 Rotary Foundation Scholarship, Germany

== Select publications ==
- Genetic Encoding of Targeted Magnetic Resonance Imaging Contrast Agents for Tumor Imaging. Simone Schuerle, Maiko Furubayashi, Ava P. Soleimany, Tinotenda Gwisai, Wei Huang, Christopher Voigt and Sangeeta N. Bhatia. ACS Synthetic Biology, vol. 9: no. 2, pp. 392–401, Washington, DC: American Chemical Society, 2020.
- Synthetic and living micropropellers for convection-enhanced nanoparticle transport. Simone Schuerle, Ava P. Soleimany, T. Yeh, G.M. Anand, M. Häberli, H.E. Fleming, Nima Mirkhani, Famin Qiu, Sabine Hauert, X. Wang, Bradley J. Nelson and Sangeeta N. Bhatia. Science Advances, vol. 5: no. 4, pp. eaav4803, Washington, DC: AAAS, 2019.
- Robotically controlled microprey to resolve initial attack modes preceding phagocytosis. Simone Schuerle, Ima Avalos Vizcarra, Jens Moeller, Mahmut Selman Sakar, Berna Özkale, Andre Machado Lindo, Fajer Mushtaq, Ingmar Schoen, Salvador Pane, Viola Vogel and Bradley J. Nelson. Science Robotics, vol. 2: no. 2, pp. eaah6094, Washington, DC: AAAS, 2017.
- Magnetically Actuated Protease Sensors for in Vivo Tumor Profiling. Simone Schürle, Jaideep S. Dudani, Michael G. Christiansen, Polina Anikeeva and Sangeeta N. Bhatia. Nano Letters, vol. 16: no. 10, pp. 6303–6310, Washington, DC: American Chemical Society, 2016.
- Three-Dimensional Magnetic Manipulation of Micro- and Nanostructures for Applications in Life Sciences. Simone Schuerle, Sandro Erni, Maarten Flink, Bradley E. Kratochvil and Bradley J. Nelson. IEEE Transactions on Magnetics, vol. 49: no. 1, pp. 321–330, Piscataway, NJ, USA: IEEE Inst. Electrical Engineers Inc., 2013.
- Helical and Tubular Lipid Microstructures that are Electroless-Coated with CoNiReP for Wireless Magnetic Manipulation. Simone Schuerle, Salvador Pané, Eva Pellicer, Jordi Sort, Maria D. Baro and Bradley J. Nelson. Small, vol. 8: no. 10, pp. 1498–1502, Weinheim: Wiley-VCH, 2012.
