= Ritmoteca.com =

US-based online music store

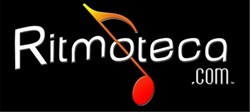
- Industry: Online music store
- Founded: 1998
- Defunct: 2003
- Fate: Self-liquidated
- Headquarters: Miami, Florida, U.S.
- Key people: Ivan Parron
- Products: Downloadable Music
- Number of employees: 200
- Website: Ritmoteca.com (no affiliation to current domain holder)

Ritmoteca.com was an online music store. Founded in Miami, Florida, in 1998 during the Dot-com bubble by Ivan Parron, the company was a Latin music download website and an early predecessor to Apple Inc.'s iTunes business model of selling digital music downloads over the Internet.

Ivan Parron founded the company after operating the web development company Internet Marketing Consultants, which designed Ritmoteca's user interface. Ritmoteca.com aggregated exclusive digital distribution rights from over one hundred independent Latin music record labels and amassed a library of over 500,000 music tracks and videos, including exclusive digital distribution rights to catalogs of Latin artists such as Marc Anthony, Tito Puente and Celia Cruz. The company was signed digital distribution agreements with major record labels, signing agreements with Universal Music Group, Sony Music Entertainment, Bertelsmann Music Group and Warner Music Group. These agreements gave the company digital distribution rights for artists such as U2, Madonna, Britney Spears, Enrique Iglesias and Jay-Z.

The company grew to as many as 200 employees through investments from institutional and "angel" investors including Bain Capital. The company was poised to launch an initial public offering when the Dot-com bubble stock market suddenly crashed on April 14, 2000. That event, combined with the emergence of the company Napster on the music scene, enabling people to trade music online for free, made it virtually impossible for the company to raise additional venture capital. The company evolved into a distributor of digital music rights and eventually closed down in 2005.
