= Benchmark Email =

Email marketing company

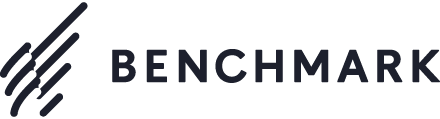
- Type: Private
- Industry: Email marketing, Software
- Founded: July 2004
- Headquarters: Saint Louis, Missouri, U.S.
- Key people: Jonathan Herrick (CEO), Curt Keller (Co-Founder / CIO), Denise Keller (Co-Founder / COO)
- Products: On-Demand Email Marketing Software
- Number of employees: 120
- Website: benchmarkemail.com

Benchmark Email is an international, internet-based service provider of email marketing with headquarters in St. Louis, Missouri. The company was founded by Curt and Denise Keller in 2004.

== Overview ==
The company offers various free and paid editions. Benchmark is a member of Returnpath.net and the Email Sender & Provider Coalition industry consortiums.

The company has pursued expansion into international markets by translating the software from English into Spanish, French, German, Chinese, Japanese, Portuguese, and Italian. It has also established offices in the Philippines, Japan, China, India, Spain, Taiwan, and Italy, among several other countries. Recently, the website was also launched in French.

== Merger ==
In 2019, Benchmark Email merged with Hatchbuck, and day-to-day leadership was transferred to Jonathan Herrick, the former CEO of Hatchbuck. The flagship Hatchbuck product was rebranded as BenchmarkONE.

== See also ==
- Social media marketing
- Simple Mail Transfer Protocol
