= Pixo =

Handheld electronic device operating system software development

- Industry: Mobile software
- Founded: 1994
- Founder: Paul Mercer
- Defunct: 2003
- Fate: Acquired by Sun Microsystems
- Successor: Sun Microsystems
- Products: Pixo OS

Pixo was a company that developed infrastructure for hand-held devices. It was founded in 1994 when Paul Mercer, a software developer at Apple, left to form his own company. The company developed a system software toolkit in C++ for use on cell phones and other hand-held devices. Pixo was acquired by Sun Microsystems in 2003, and Sun was in turn acquired by Oracle Corporation in 2010.

== Pixo OS and use in Apple's iPod ==
In 2001, Pixo was rehired by Apple to adapt their system software for use in the iPod. The use of the Pixo OS in the iPod was never formally announced, although the first-generation iPod's "About iPod" display includes a mention of Pixo, and a Connectix biography of their VP of engineering Mike Neil mentions his role as "lead architect on the Pixo OS that is used in ... the Apple iPod". Apple acquired the Pixo OS shortly after shipping the iPod and removed mention of Pixo from the "About iPod" display with a firmware update to the first-generation iPod.

On April 9, 2007, Apple CEO Steve Jobs announced the shipment of its 100 millionth iPod, making the Pixo OS one of the most widely used embedded operating systems.

With the 2014 discontinuation of the iPod Classic and the 2017 discontinuation of the iPod Nano, which did not run iOS, Apple no longer sells a Pixo-based iPod.
