= Michael J. Sailor =

American nanotechnologist

- Education: Harvey Mudd College (B.S., 1983); Northwestern University (M.S., Ph.D. 1988)
- Known for: Porous silicon nanotechnology
- Scientific career
- Fields: Nanotechnology, Porous silicon, Biomaterials
- Workplaces: University of California, San Diego (1990–)

Michael J. Sailor is a nanotechnology researcher and professor at the University of California, San Diego. Sailor is best known for his research on porous silicon, a nanostructured material that is prepared by electrochemical corrosion of crystalline silicon wafers.

He pioneered the development of label-free biosensors from thin optical films of porous silicon. He prepared the first microparticles and nanoparticles of porous silicon, and harnessed the intrinsic photoluminescence of these formulations for in vitro and in vivo imaging applications. He was the first to demonstrate time-gated luminescence imaging with these nanoparticles, important because time-gating suppresses tissue autofluorescence that often compromises the fidelity of fluorescence images of biological tissues. He also adapted the concept of "Smart Dust" to the field of nanotechnology: the idea that microscopic particles can be manufactured with optical, chemical, and mechanical properties that can perform sensing, signaling, and motive functions.

== Awards and honors ==
Sailor has received the following awards and honors:

- Advanced Materials “Hall of Fame” researcher (2019)
- Elected Fellow, US National Academy of Inventors (2015)
- Outstanding Alumnus Award, Harvey Mudd College (2013)
- Chancellor's Award for Postdoctoral Scholar Mentoring, University of California, San Diego (2013)
- Elected Fellow, American Association for the Advancement of Science (2012)
- Meritorious Civilian Service Award, United States Air Force (2010)
- J. Clarence Karcher Medal, University of Oklahoma (2008)
- Outstanding Faculty Mentor in the Sciences and Engineering, University of California, San Diego (2004)
- Lipscomb Lecturer, University of South Carolina (2004)
- 63rd Frontiers In Chemistry Distinguished Lecturer, Case Western Reserve University (2003)
- Grand Prize, National Inventors Hall of Fame Collegiate Inventors Competition (2003)
- “The Best of What’s New” general technology award winner, Popular Science Magazine (2002)
- Annual Award for Architectural Research, Architecture Magazine (1999)
- Camille Dreyfus Foundation Teacher-Scholar Award (1994)
- Alfred P. Sloan Foundation Fellow (1994)
- National Science Foundation Young Investigator Award (1993)
- Beckman Young Investigators Award (1993)

== Memberships ==
Sailor is a member of the following organizations and associations:

- American Chemical Society
- Materials Research Society
- Electrochemical Society
- American Association for the Advancement of Science
