= Jason Olim =

American former CEO of CDNow

Jason Olim is the former CEO and co-founder of CDNow, Inc., one of the first e-commerce companies (founded in February, 1994). He has earned Entrepreneur of the Year awards from the Small Business Association, Arthur Andersen, the Greater Philadelphia Chamber of Commerce (1997) and the Greater Philadelphia Venture Group (1999).

Olim earned a Bachelor of Arts degree in computer science from Brown University.

== CDNow ==
CDNow.com was among the first successful global online retailers. The company was founded in February 1994 by twin brothers Jason and Matthew Olim of Ambler, Pennsylvania. Initially launched as a Telnet service in August 1994, CDNow became a retail site in September 1994 — far earlier than most of the dot-com retailers that gained notoriety after 2000.
