= Geoffrey von Maltzahn =

American inventor

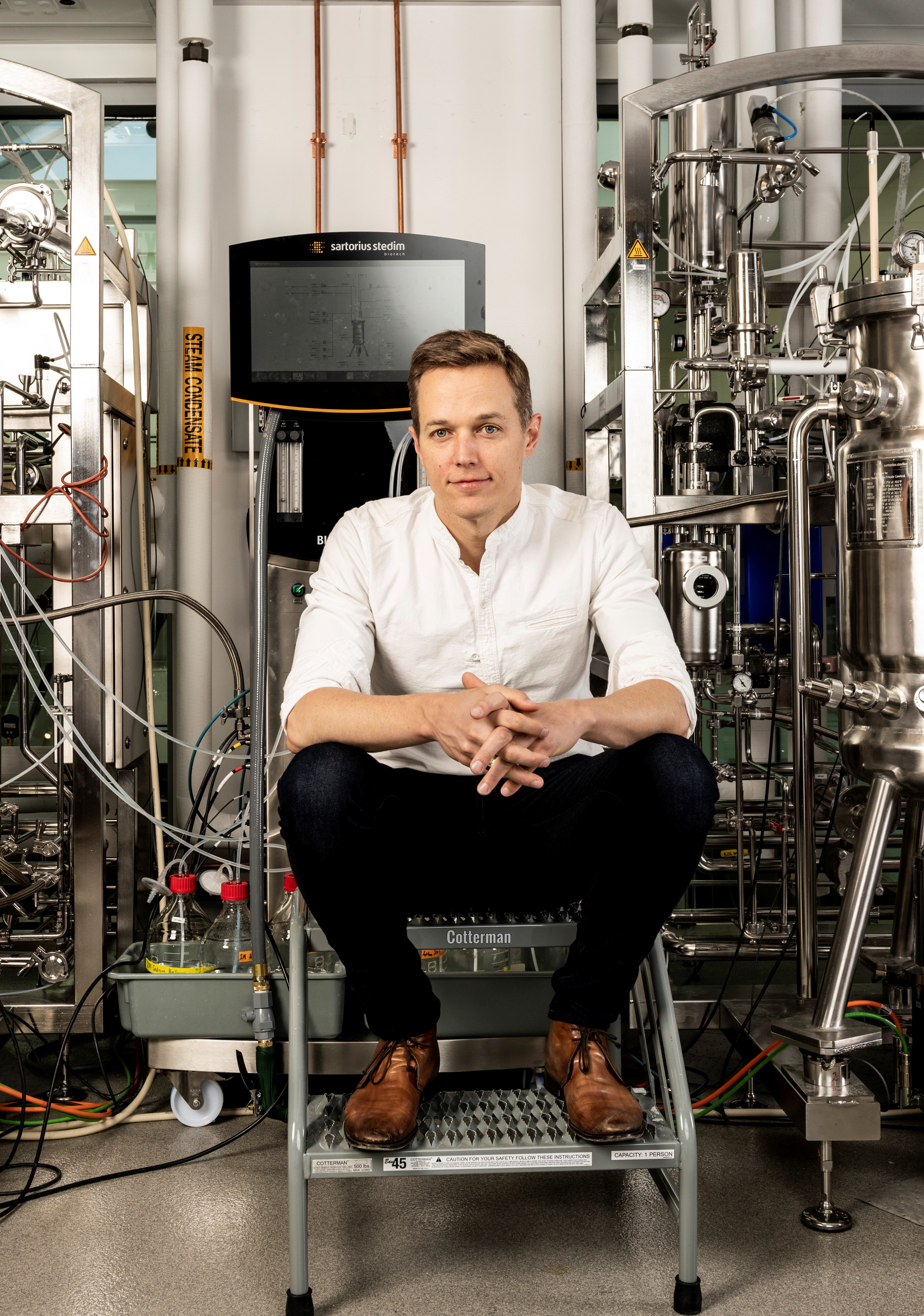
- Education: Massachusetts Institute of Technology (S.B.); University of California, San Diego (M.S.); Massachusetts Institute of Technology (Ph.D.)
- Awards: Lemelson-MIT Student Prize (2009); National Inventors Hall of Fame Collegiate Inventors Competition Graduate Prize (2009), Massachusetts Institute of Technology Randolph G Wei Award (2003)
- Scientific career
- Fields: Bioengineering

Geoffrey von Maltzahn (born July 22, 1980) is an American biological engineer and businessman in the biotechnology and life sciences industry. Von Maltzahn has cofounded companies including Indigo Agriculture, Generate Biomedicines, Seres Therapeutics, Tessera Therapeutics, and Quotient Therapeutics.

== Early life and education ==
Geoffrey von Maltzahn was born in Arlington, Texas, and subsequently moved to Alexandria, Virginia where he graduated from Thomas Jefferson High School for Science and Technology. He was awarded his B.S. in Chemical Engineering from the Massachusetts Institute of Technology (MIT) in 2003, his Master of Science degree in Bioengineering from the University of California, San Diego in 2005, and his PhD from the Harvard–MIT Division of Health Sciences and Technology at the Massachusetts Institute of Technology in 2010. His thesis advisor was Sangeeta Bhatia.

== Career ==
In 2009, von Maltzahn joined Flagship Pioneering, a Cambridge, Massachusetts-based venture capital firm investing in life sciences biotechnology, and sustainability startups. In his first few years at Flagship, von Maltzahn helped launch several such companies, including Seres Therapeutics and Indigo Agriculture. He served as chief technology officer at Seres when the company developed SER-109, one of the first microbiome therapeutics.

In 2018, von Maltzahn cofounded two biotechnology startups, Generate Biomedicines and Tessera Therapeutics. Two years later he became a general partner at Flagship.

In 2023, von Maltzahn and another Flagship partner, Jacob Rubens, co-founded Quotient Therapeutics, a biotechnology startup with offices in both Massachusetts and the UK. Quotient uses genome sequencing technology to develop medication for diseases caused by somatic mutations.
