= CDNow =

Online shopping company

CDnow, Inc.
- Founded: February 1994; 32 years ago
- Founder: Jason Olim; Matthew Olim
- Defunct: 2013
- Fate: Acquired by Bertelsmann, Acquired by Amazon.com, shut down
- Headquarters: Ambler, Pennsylvania

CDnow, Inc. was a dot-com company that operated an online shopping website selling compact discs and music-related products. In April 1998, during the dot-com bubble, the company was valued at over $1 billion (~$1.79 billion in 2024). In July 2000, it was acquired by Bertelsmann Music Group for $117 million (~$202 million in 2024); shortly thereafter Amazon was contracted to operate the website. At its peak, it employed over 750 people and had offices in Fort Washington, Pennsylvania, New York City, London, and Los Angeles.

== Establishment and growth ==
CDnow was founded in February 1994 by twin brothers Jason Olim and Matthew Olim in their parents' basement in Ambler, Pennsylvania. Initially launched as a Telnet service in August 1994, CDNow became a retail website in September 1994 using Valley Records Distributors as a drop-ship fulfillment center. With three employees, the company moved near the Penllyn train station in Lower Gwynedd Township, Montgomery County, Pennsylvania and a couple years later it moved to the Strawbridge & Clothier building in Jenkintown, Pennsylvania. In December 1994, CDNow claimed to be the first company that allowed people to buy albums online. At the time, it said it had over 140,000 different albums available for purchase on its web site. In 1995, an article in the Los Angeles Times said that CDNow had brought the web "one step closer to the day when artists will market directly to consumers, cutting out distributors such as record labels."

In 1997, the company had revenues of $18 million and in February 1998, with 100 employees, the company became a public company via an initial public offering. CDNow then embarked on a large Internet advertising campaign, and was an innovator in preference-based retail recommendations, online video, the use of editorial content as a means to promote interest internet affiliate marketing programs, and email marketing. On March 17, 1999, CDNow acquired its largest competitor, another Philadelphia area company, N2K, whose online properties included Music Boulevard and Jazz Central Station. In July 1999, the company announced a deal to merge with Columbia House, establishing a new public company jointly held by CDNow's shareholders, Time Warner and Sony.

== Decline ==
CDNow was among the first of the Internet companies to show signs of struggle with the dot-com business model. On March 20, 2000, as the dot-com bubble burst, Barron's published a cover article called "Burning Up", which noted that the company was running out of cash. In March 2000, the Columbia House merger was called off. In June 2000, the company closed its London office to cut costs.

In July 2000, Bertelsmann Music Group acquired the company, intending to combine it with its BMG Direct record club as a new venture called BeMusic, and eventually add Napster to the service. Bertelsmann paid just $117 million (~$209 million in 2024), a price that was down over 90% from the valuation of the company at its peak in April 1998. The founding Olim brothers received a total of $17 million. In April 2001, the company cut 40 employees, 10% of its staff. In August 2001, the company closed its Japanese website and laid off 200 employees.

In November 2002, Bertelsmann announced it would close CDnow's Fort Washington facility and lay off the company's remaining 33 employees. Later that month, they signed a deal to outsource CDnow website operations to Amazon. The new deal retained a revised version of the BMG Direct model called the "Preferred Buyers Club", offering a 20% discount for club-edition records; all other music was sold at standard Amazon prices. In 2011, the CDnow.com URL was redirected to a maintenance notice, and in 2013, it was permanently taken offline.
