= Chemdex =

Former B2B e-commerce company

Chemdex Corporation
- Founded: September 1997; 28 years ago
- Founder: David Perry
- Defunct: April 12, 2011; 15 years ago
- Fate: Bankruptcy; acquired by Trubiquity
- Headquarters: Carlsbad, California
- Revenue: ▲$3 million (2003)
- Net income: ▲ -$14 million (2003)
- Total assets: ▼$7 million (2003)
- Total equity: ▼ -$7 million (2003)
- Number of employees: 33 (2003)

Chemdex Corporation, later known as Ventro Corporation and then NexPrise, Inc., was a B2B e-commerce company that first operated an online marketplace for products related to the life sciences industry such as laboratory chemicals, enzymes, and equipment, but later expanded into a few other industries. It was notable for its $7 billion market capitalization during the dot-com bubble despite minimal revenues.

== History ==
The company was founded in September 1997 by David Perry, a mid-level oil refinery manager at Exxon whose business plan won 2nd place in a Harvard University competition.

In October 1998, the company launched its service.

The company raised $45 million in venture capital funding from Genentech founder Robert A. Swanson, Kleiner Perkins Caufield & Byers, and CMGI.

On July 27, 1999, the company became a public company via an initial public offering that raised $112.5 million. After its shares soared 60% to $25 per share on its first day of trading, the company had a market capitalization of $758 million despite only having $29,000 in sales in 1998 and $165,000 in sales in the first quarter of 1999, 82% of which came from Genentech.

In September 1999, the company acquired Promedix.com for $340 million in stock. In December 1999, the company acquired SpecialityMD.com for $115 million in stock and formed a joint venture with Tenet Healthcare. The stock price surged to over $100.

In February 2000, the company changed its name to Ventro Corporation. News of the name change sent the stock up 30% in one day, to $155 per share.

On February 25, 2000, the stock price peaked at $243 per share.

In December 2000, the company shut its Chemdex and Promedix marketplaces and laid off 235 employees.

By June 2001, shares in the company traded for 39 cents each.

On August 9, 2001, the company acquired NexPrise and in January 2002, the company changed its name to NexPrise, Inc.

On February 4, 2002, the company acquired InfoPrise.

In June 2002, the company announced the release of the nProcess Platform.

The company changed its business plan to be a provider of cloud-based enterprise content management solutions.

On January 18, 2011, the company filed bankruptcy.

In April 2011, Trubiquity acquired all of the company's assets.
