= Alacra =

American company

- Industry: Business Research
- Founded: 1996
- Headquarters: New York, United States
- Key people: Steven Goldstein
- Products: Alacra Book, Alacra Connections, Alacra Current Awareness, Alacra on Demand, Alacra Portals, Alacra Premium, Alacra Pulse, Alacra Store, Alacra Compliance Enterprise, Monitoring, Screening & Alerting, Alacra Authority File, Alacra Legal Entity Directory, Alacra Concordance
- Website: alacra.com

Alacra, Inc. is a privately owned American company that provides information and workflow tools to financial institutions, corporations, and professional services firms. In 2015, the company was acquired by Opus Global.

== History ==
The company was founded as Data Downlink Corporation in 1996 by Steven Goldstein and Michael Angle, In 2001, the company adopted the name Alacra as part of a change in its corporate identity and online information service. It is headquartered in New York with an office in London.

The company developed tools for online business and financial research, including services that aggregated licensed databases and other business information sources. In 2009, Alacra Pulse was launched, a platform, intended to combine traditional business news and investment research with selected blogs and alternative commentary sources for company research.

By the early 2010s, Alacra had also become active in reference data and regulatory compliance workflows. In 2012, KMWorld described the company as providing data integration and legal entity mapping services to financial institutions and professional services firms.

== Products and services ==
Alacra's services have included business research tools, compliance workflow products, and reference data products. Its Alacra Authority File was reported in 2012 as a database of legal entity data covering about 200,000 global business entities. The service was developed in the context of the global legal entity identifier system and was intended to help financial firms manage reference data used in compliance and risk processes.

In 2014, NICE Actimize partnered with Alacra to integrate Alacra Compliance Enterprise and Alacra's reference data platform into a customer due diligence and anti-money laundering solution.

In 2015, Alacra added Global Intermediary Identification Numbers to its entity data service. WatersTechnology reported that the identifiers were made available through Authority File Plus, which tracked rated, regulated and listed entities. Later that year, the company launched Resolve, a legal entity look-up function that allowed users to search entities by names, legal entity identifiers, GIINs and other codes.

Alacra received praise for going outside traditional media outlets and creating a "data feed produced by monitoring a group of financial commentators that includes bloggers."

== Acquisition by Opus Global ==
On 30 September 2015, Opus Global acquired Alacra. The financial terms of the transaction were not disclosed. A-Team Insight reported that Opus planned to combine Alacra's know-your-customer, anti-money laundering and reference data services with its compliance platform, and that Alacra's management team and approximately 70 employees were expected to join Opus Global. WatersTechnology also reported that Opus intended to integrate Alacra's compliance data, including know-your-customer information, into its Hiperos Third Party Network. Information Today described Alacra at the time as a business information solutions company and noted that the acquisition would allow Opus to integrate compliance data from Alacra's external providers into the Hiperos network.
