= Scout Electromedia =

Defunct consumer electronic company

Scout Electromedia (originally Scout Electronics) was a late 1990s wireless consumer product company based in San Francisco. It was founded by Dan Bomze, William Cockayne, and Geoff Pitfield.

The company created the modo handheld wireless device which delivered up-to-the-minute entertainment information to urban youth in New York, San Francisco, and Los Angeles.

The product received high praise in a wide array of press from Playboy to the New York Times. It was venture backed by Flatiron Partners, TechFund, and idealab!. However, the backers ran into financial problems in the wake of the dot-com crash, and funding dried up, which resulted in the swift end of Scout. Ultimately the service ran for just two months in New York and San Francisco, with the company going out of business one day before the scheduled launch in Los Angeles.

The company's chief executive, Geoff Pitfield was fired on October 20, 2000. By the time it was wound up the company employed 84 people.
