= Liquid Audio =

Defunct American digital media and audio software company

Liquid Audio Inc.
- Type: Public
- Industry: Digital media; software
- Founded: 1996
- Defunct: 2003
- Fate: Acquired by Anderson Media and renamed Liquid Digital Media
- Successor: Liquid Digital Media, Inc.
- Headquarters: Redwood City, California, U.S.
- Products: Online audio distribution platform; streaming and download software

Liquid Audio Inc was a US software company based in Redwood City, California.

Formed in 1996, Liquid Audio developed a major standard, multiple software clients, and a client/server media distribution system for streaming and downloading audio on the Internet. Along with RealNetworks' RealAudio (on the RealPlayer), Liquid Audio was one of the two emerging online audio standards in the 1990s.

The company's founders – Gerry Kearby, Robert Flynn, and Phil Wiser – focused on professional audio quality and copyright security to differentiate the offer. The company was a pioneer in enabling copy-restricted media distribution, working closely with record companies and publishing rights agencies such as ASCAP, BMI, The Harry Fox Agency, in the United States, and various other agencies around the world. To represent the industry's copyright interests, Liquid Audio, RealNetworks and a host of other companies formed the Digital Media Association to negotiate copyright fees for the Digital Millennium Copyright Act.

Liquid Audio's solution was ultimately supplanted by RealAudio, and others such as Microsoft's Windows Media Player. In 2002, Microsoft bought Liquid Audio's DRM patents. After the failure of talks on a takeover by Alliance Entertainment, in January 2003, Liquid Audio was acquired by Anderson Media and was renamed to Liquid Digital Media.

Liquid Digital Media, Inc. focused on custom services for Internet media delivery, including video and audio encoding in WMA, WMV, and MP3 formats; windows DRM encryption; metadata management; image processing/conversion; content hosting/storage; distribution and fulfillment; activity and sales reporting; and physical/digital tie-ins.

On August 28, 2011, Anderson Media/Anderson Merchandisers announced the immediate and effective closing of Liquid Digital Media, ending a partnership with Walmart.
