= Ondi Timoner =

American film director

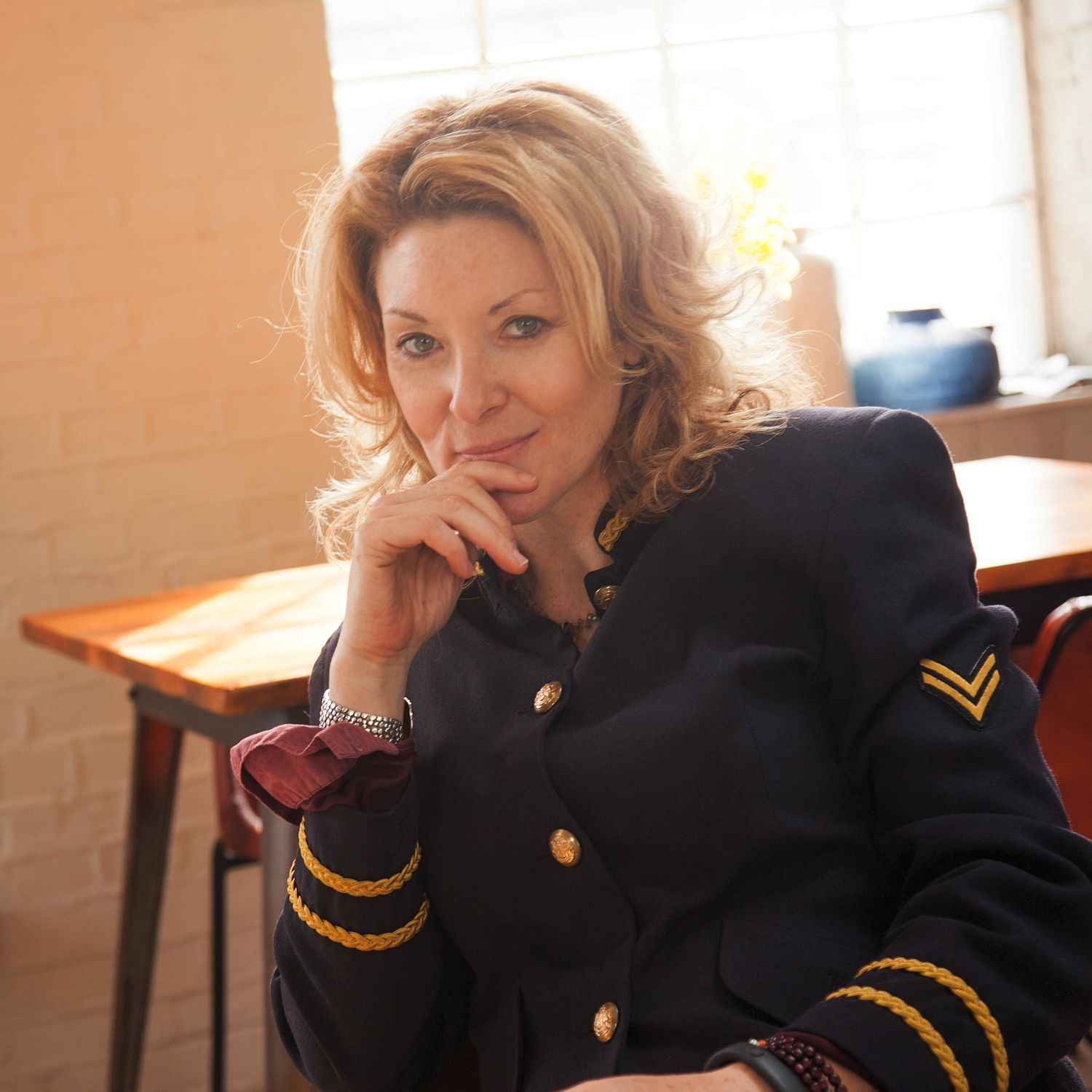
- Born: Andrea Doane Timoner; Miami, Florida, U.S.
- Education: Yale University
- Occupations: Film director, producer
- Years active: 1994–present
- Children: 1

Ondi Doane Timoner is an American filmmaker and the founder and chief executive officer of Interloper Films, a production company located in Pasadena, California.

Timoner is, as of the mid-2020s, the only filmmaker to have twice won the U.S. Grand Jury Prize for Documentary at the Sundance Film Festival, for Dig! (2004) and We Live in Public (2009); both films were later acquired by New York's Museum of Modern Art for its permanent collection. Her documentary Last Flight Home (2022), about the final days of her father Eli Timoner, was shortlisted for the Academy Award for Best Documentary Feature and received an Emmy nomination for Exceptional Merit in Documentary Filmmaking.

Timoner is a member of the Academy of Motion Picture Arts & Sciences, the Directors Guild of America (DGA), the Producers Guild of America (PGA), the International Documentary Association (IDA), Film Fatales, and Women in Film.

== Early life ==
Timoner was born in Miami, Florida, to Elissa and Eli Timoner, co-founder of Air Florida. She has two siblings, Rabbi Rachel Timoner and David Timoner, who co-founded Interloper Films and has collaborated on several of her works.

Timoner attended Yale University, where she founded the Yale Street Theater Troupe, a guerrilla theater ensemble that performed spontaneously in unexpected environments, in 1992. She made her directorial stage debut in 1993 with her production of Sarah Daniels' Masterpieces. Timoner shot her first documentary film, 3000 Miles and a Woman with a Video Camera, with her younger brother David and John Krokidas, interviewing people at crossroads and convenience stores while on a cross country road trip.

She subsequently directed several short documentary projects, including Reflections on a Moment: The Sixties and the Nineties, which examined her generation’s nostalgia for the 1960s, and The Purple Horizon, a 60-minute film on the March on Washington for Lesbian, Gay and Bi Equal Rights and Liberation. For Voices from Inside Time she interviewed women in prison, work that led her to Bonnie Jean Foreshaw, the subject of her first feature-length documentary, The Nature of the Beast (1994), which received Yale University's Howard Lamar Film Prize for best undergraduate film.

Timoner graduated cum laude from Yale in 1994, where she majored in American Studies, with a concentration in Film and Literature and Theater Studies.

== Career ==
=== Early years ===
Her first feature documentary, The Nature of The Beast (1994), was about the life and case of Bonnie Jean Foreshaw (a woman serving the longest prison sentence in the state of Connecticut for incidentally killing a pregnant woman while defending herself against a man) and discusses racism and systemic holes in the justice system.

She also worked on PBS documentaries while interning for documentary filmmaker Helen Whitney.

Timoner has worked as an Assistant Producer for NBC Media Services and Assistant Regional Coordinator for the Steven Spielberg Holocaust/Oral History Project in Miami, Florida.

=== 2000s ===
Timoner created, executive produced and directed the VH1 original series Sound Affects (2000), a film about music's effect at critical moments in people's lives.

Timoner directed, co-produced, and edited Dig! (2004) with her brother David Timoner, which chronicles seven years in the lives of two neo-psychedelic bands, The Dandy Warhols and The Brian Jonestown Massacre. The film explores the love-hate relationship of the band's frontmen, Courtney Taylor and Anton Newcombe. The film won the Grand Jury Prize at the 2004 Sundance Film Festival, is now part of the permanent collection of the Museum of Modern Art (MoMA) in New York City, and was screened as the finale of the Film Society at Lincoln Center and MoMA's 33rd annual New Directors/New Films Festival, in 2004.

Timoner co-directed the short film Recycle (2005), a documentary about a homeless person who makes a garden in downtown Los Angeles. The film premiered at the 2005 Sundance Film Festival and played the Cannes Film Festival. Her third feature documentary, Join Us (2007), follows families in their escape from a cult. It premiered at LA Film Festival, winning awards at the Sidewalk Film Festival and Vancouver International Film Festival.

When the Jonas Brothers were signed to Columbia Records, Timoner was hired to film three music videos for the group.

Timoner debuted We Live in Public at the 2009 Sundance Film Festival. The film focuses on Josh Harris, an American internet entrepreneur who founded Pseudo.com, a webcasting site that filed for bankruptcy in 2000. WE LIVE IN PUBLIC won the Grand Jury Prize award in the Documentary category at the Sundance Film Festival and a Special Jury Mention for "Best Documentary Film Over 30 Minutes Long" at the 2009 Karlovy Vary International Film Festival.

=== 2010s ===
Timoner was hired by Ralph Winter and Terry Botwick to make her fifth feature, COOL IT (2010), adapted from the 2007 book of the same name following controversial political scientist Bjørn Lomborg. The film premiered at Toronto International Film Festival and was distributed theatrically by Roadside Attractions.

Her next film, Library of Dust (2011), shines light on canisters of cremated remains found at the Oregon State Hospital. Co-directed with Robert James, Library of Dust premiered at SXSW in 2011 and went on to win The Grand Jury Prize at five festivals, including Seattle International Film Festival, Taos Film Festival, Traverse City Film Festival, and International Film Festival of Puerto Rico. The Last Mile (2015), made with Conde Nast, focuses on a tech incubator inside San Quentin State Prison.

Timoner's sixth feature documentary, Brand: A Second Coming (2015), about the journey of comedian/author/activist Russell Brand, was chosen to be the opening night film at the 2015 SXSW Film Festival in Austin, Texas and was later picked up by Showtime. She was the sixth and final director to work on the film, Albert Maysles being one of the predecessors.

Timoner was invited by real estate entrepreneur Jimmy Stice to visit his for-profit sustainability program, Kalu Yala, in the Panamaian Jungle. Timoner filmed her next project around the business venture in 2016. Spike Jonze picked up the project for Viceland and the footage was released as the ten-hour docu-series Jungletown (2017).

Timoner debuted her narrative feature Mapplethorpe (2018), titled The Perfect Moment in pre-production, at the 2018 Tribeca Festival, where it was nominated for Best Narrative Feature. It is based on the life and career of the controversial portrait photographer Robert Mapplethorpe, starring Matt Smith as the titular artist. The project received a grant through the Tribeca Film Institute's 9th annual All Access Program and was invited to participate in the Sundance Institute Director's, Writer's and Producer's Labs - receiving an Adrienne Shelley Grant. It was later picked up by Samuel Goldwyn Films in July 2018 and had its theatrical release on March 1, 2019. The Director's Cut, which was selected to premiere at Sundance, but ultimately did not screen there, was released April 2, 2021.

=== 2020s ===
In 2020, Timoner directed Coming Clean, a feature documentary about addiction through the eyes of recovering addicts and political leaders. The film premiered at the Bentonville Film Festival on August 6, 2020 and won the Impact Award at the 2020 and Special Jury Prize for Editing at Sidewalk Film Festival 2020.

Timoner's 2022 feature, Last Flight Home, tells the story of her father, Eli Timoner, who died during the film's production. The film premiered in the Special Screening category at Sundance Film Festival in 2022, and was purchased by MTV Documentary Films shortly after. The film was shortlisted for the 2023 Academy Awards and received an Emmy nomination for Exceptional Merit In Documentary Filmmaking shortly after. In 2023, Timoner completed her documentary about the disruption of finance, The New Americans: Gaming a Revolution, which premiered at SXSW.

Timoner has directed All God's Children, which follows Rabbi Rachel Timoner, a reform rabbi and political activist, and Reverend Dr. Robert Waterman, a black baptist reverend and community leader, for several years as they bring their respective congregations, Congregation Beth Elohim and Antioch Baptist Church, together in an attempt to combat the racism and anti-semitism that affects their communities in Brooklyn.

She directed The Inn Between about the eponymous facility, the only hospice and recuperative care facility for the homeless in the U.S.

On 7 January 2025, Timoner's home in Altadena, California, was destroyed in the Eaton Fire while she was filming in Rome. News reports noted that the fire also damaged or destroyed film materials, musical instruments and personal archives associated with her work.

== Other work ==
Timoner co-directed Library of Dust, a short film about thousands of copper urns discovered at the Oregon State Hospital. She founded, directed and produced A Total Disruption (2012), the latter of which is a web portal of 300 shorts and classes to share origin stories of Internet founders and artists using technology to innovate independence. Her short film Obey the Artist, about graphic artist Shepard Fairey, premiered at the SXSW Film Festival in 2013. Timoner's short film, Amanda F***Ing Palmer on the Rocks, about musician Amanda Palmer premiered in 2014 at the Tribeca Festival and played other festivals, winning the Sheffield Shorts Award at the Sheffield DocFest.

== Politics ==
Compassion & Choices announced in May 2023 that it was partnering with Interloper Films, to help them get the right to die for terminally-ill people by screening Last Flight Home, along with in-person Q&As, providing testimony from the Timoner family, political advocates and experts about the right to die. Timoner and family were in Washington in early June 2023 to screen and discuss the film at an event presented by the U.S. Representative Brittany Pettersen, to advocate for the human right to bodily autonomy at the end of life, and specifically to support legislative efforts to reform the ban on federal funding for medical-aid-in-dying (ASFRA) to ensure equal access to the right in states where it is already legal.

== Select filmography ==
=== Feature film ===
- Dig! (2004)
- Join Us (2007)
- We Live in Public (2009)
- Cool It (2010)
- Brand: A Second Coming (2015)
- Mapplethorpe (2018)
- Coming Clean (2020)
- Mapplethorpe, The Director's Cut (2021)
- Last Flight Home (2022)
- The New Americans: Gaming a Revolution (2023)
- Dig! XX (2024)
- The Inn Between (2024)
- All God's Children (2024)

=== Short film ===
- 3000 Miles and a Woman with a Video Camera
- Recycle (2004)
- Library of Dust (2011)
- Amanda F***ing Palmer on the Rocks (2014)
- Russell Brand's The Birds (2014)
- Obey the Artist (2014)
- The Last Mile (2015)
- All the Walls Came Down (2025)

=== Television ===
- The Nature of the Beast (1994)
- Sound Affects (2000)
- Jungletown (2017)

== Select awards and recognition ==
- 1999 — Timoner was Grammy-nominated for Best Long Form Music Video for an EPK she directed about the band Fastball.
- 2004 — Grand Jury Prize at Sundance Film Festival for Dig!
- 2004 — Best Director Jury Prize at BendFilm Festival for Dig!
- 2007 — Special Jury Prize at the Sidewalk Film Festival for Join Us
- 2007 — Grand Jury Prize for Documentary Short at Seattle International Film Festival for Library of Dust
- 2009 — Grand Jury Prize at Sundance Film Festival for We Live in Public
- 2015 — No Limits Award at the Ashland Independent Film Festival for Brand: A Second Coming
- 2015 — Dramatic Storytelling Award at the Sarasota Film Festival for Brand: A Second Coming
- 2012 — Ashland Independent Film Festival's Rogue Award
- 2014 — Sheffield Short Doc Award at the Sheffield DocFest for Amanda F---ing Palmer on the Rocks
- 2017 — Kodak Auteur Award
- 2018 — Audience Awards at Sidewalk Film Festival for Mapplethorpe
- 2018 — Audience Awards at Tribeca Festival for Mapplethorpe
- 2018 — Best Director at Long Beach International Film Festival for Mapplethorpe
- 2020 — Impact Award at the Naples International Film Festival 2020 for Coming Clean
- 2020 — Special Jury Prize for Editing at Sidewalk Film Festival 2020 for Coming Clean
- 2022 — Special Screenings selection at Sundance Film Festival
- 2022 — Robert and Anne Drew Award for Documentary Excellence at DOC NYC for Last Flight Home
- 2022 — Best Feature Documentary Award at Dallas International Film Festival for Last Flight Home
- 2022 — Filmmaker Impact Award at Hamptons Documentary Festival for Last Flight Home
- 2022 — Best Documentary Feature at Woodstock Film Festival for Last Flight Home
- 2022 — Critics Choice Award at Key West Film Festival for Last Flight Home
- 2023 — Best Documentary Feature Nominee for Girls on Film Awards for Last Flight Home
- 2023 — WGA Award Nominee Documentary Screenplay for the Writers Guild of America for Last Flight Home
- 2023 — Cinema Eye Honors "The Unforgettables" Award for Last Flight Home
- 2023 — Cinema Eye Honors "Audience Choice Prize" nominee for Last Flight Home
- 2023 — Oscars Shortlist for Best Documentary Feature for Last Flight Home
- 2023 — Emmy Nomination: Exceptional Merit for Last Flight Home

== Personal life ==
Timoner is the daughter of Eli Timoner, founder of Air Florida. She has two siblings. Timoner has one son, born in 2003. She married composer Morgan Doctor at the Telluride Film Festival in 2022.

== See also ==
- List of female film and television directors
- List of LGBT-related films directed by women
