= Cal Chamberlain =

American artist and journalist (1968–2008)

Cal Chamberlain (April 21, 1968 – c. July 25, 2008), born Mark Chamberlain, was an artist and Internet pioneer based in New York City. He was among the first journalists to achieve notability through online media.

== Early life ==
At the age of 15, Chamberlain ran away from his home in Seattle, Washington, for a life in New York. Before becoming involved in the Internet media, he worked as a club promoter and model for designer Stephen Sprouse. He became friends with singer and actress Debbie Harry and appeared in a video directed by Talking Heads' frontman David Byrne.

== Later career ==
In 1994, Chamberlain began blogging with Pseudo.com. A highpoint of his career came as a blogger-correspondent at the 2000 Republican and Democratic national conventions; he later donated the keyboard and webcam he used to cover those events to the Smithsonian Institution. Using a character from Judge Dredd as an inspiration, he changed his name to Cal Chamberlain and hosted a web based television show named =JUDGECAL's= High Weirdness.

After Pseudo.com folded in 2000, he briefly became a political blogger for CNN, though at the time of his death he moved away from online media and was creating metal sculptures with an art combine named the Madagascar Institute. His involvement with the group led him to participate in the Burning Man festival.

== Death ==
Chamberlain was found dead in his New York apartment in late July 2008. Based on the level of his body's decomposition, the coroner estimated that he had died on July 25. It took several weeks to find his relatives, who, aside from occasional phone calls or emails, had not seen him for more than 20 years. No official cause of death has been listed.
