= Potomac River plane crash =

"Potomac River plane crash" may refer to:

- Air Florida Flight 90 − 1982 aviation accident in which a Boeing 737 operated by Air Florida crashed into the Potomac River due to equipment failure.
- PSA Airlines Flight 5342 − 2025 mid-air collision between PSA Airlines flight and a U.S. Army Black hawk helicopter over the Potomac River.
