= Last Flight Home =

Last Flight Home may refer to:

- Last Flight Home (album), 2020 album by Todd Sucherman
- Last Flight Home, 2022 documentary film about Eli Timoner
