= Interloper Films =

Interloper Films is a production company based in Pasadena, California. Interloper was founded in 1994 by siblings Ondi Timoner and her brother David Timoner. Interloper produces documentaries, music videos, and short form media. Two Interloper documentaries, We Live in Public (2009) and DIG! (2004), have won Sundance grand jury awards. The latter film was co-released by Palm Pictures and was acquired into the permanent collection of the Museum of Modern Art in New York City. It showed at Cannes and many other prestigious festivals. We Live in Public is currently (as of May 2009) touring the festival circuit and will be appearing at many conferences including SXSW, the Cannes Film Festival and will have a New York premiere at the New Directors/New Films Festival, sponsored by the Lincoln Center and MOMA.

Over the years, the company has produced music videos for major artists such as The Dandy Warhols, Leona Lewis, The Vines, Lucinda Williams, Van Hunt, DMC, Ben Lee, Vanessa Carlton and The Jonas Brothers. Ondi Timoner earned a Grammy nomination for a music video she directed for Fastball in 1999.

Interloper Films has created national commercials for McDonald's, Ford, State Farm, the U.S. Army and DeVry.

The next project on the docket for Interloper is a narrative feature film about the life of Robert Mapplethorpe. Ondi Timoner is slated to direct the film and she will co-produce the picture with actress Eliza Dushku in conjunction with Dushku's production company, Boston Diva Prods.

== Selected filmography ==
Documentaries

- All the Walls Came Down (2025)
- We Live in Public (2009)
- Join Us (2007)
- DIG! (2004)
- The Nature of the Beast (1995)
- Lollapallooza (work in progress)
- David LaChappelle (work in progress)

Short Films

- CNN Heroes:Viola Vaughn (2008)
- CNN Heroes:Yohannes Gebregeorgis (2008)
- The Greatest Gift: The Story of One Love Africa Schools (2008)
- Recycle (2004)
- Dam Nation (2000)
- Broken: The Story of Mother Tongue (1996)
