= Janice Erlbaum =

American author

- Born: 1969 (age 56–57); New York City, NY
- Occupations: Author, Poet, Novelist
- Writing career
- Genres: Memoir, Poetry, Fiction
- Notable works: GirlBomb: A Halfway Homeless Memoir; Have You Found Her: A Memoir
- Website: girlbomb.com

Janice Erlbaum is an American author. She is the author of two memoirs, GirlBomb: A Halfway Homeless Memoir and Have You Found Her: A Memoir., and one novel for adults, "I, Liar." She is also the author of two books for tweens, Lucky Little Things and Let Me Fix That for You. Her poetry and prose have been featured in anthologies including Aloud: Voices from the Nuyorican Poets Café, The Bust Guide to the New Girl Order, The Best American Erotic Poems From 1800 to the Present, and Verses that Hurt.

She lives in her native New York City with her domestic partner, Bill Scurry, and produces an instructional web series called Advice for Young Writers.

== Early life ==
As chronicled in her memoir Girlbomb: A Halfway Homeless Memoir, after running away from home at age 15 Erlbaum spent years going from youth shelter to shelter, a self-described "halfway homeless" high school student afflicted with a taste for hard drugs and risky choices, while attending Bayard Rustin High School for the Humanities.

== Poetry ==
Published for the first time at the age of 20 in New York Press, where she was a frequent contributor of personal essays and short features from 1991 through 1995, Janice Erlbaum was a prominent fixture on the early '90s New York slam poetry scene, performing as a member of the feminist collective Pussy Poets, and earning a spot on MTV's "Sex in the '90s: Love Sucks" special, as well as the cover of the Nuyorican anthology. She was a featured poet on the Lollapalooza '94 tour, and performed and hosted at Woodstock 94. Pussy Poets and Erlbaum's solo act were seen at venues including Dixon Place, the Kitchen, St. Mark's Poetry Project, and Fez.

== Books ==
In 2006, Villard/Random House published her first book, Girlbomb: A Halfway Homeless Memoir. An explicit look back at her teenage years spent in shelters and group homes. It was awarded a spot on the New York Public Library's "25 to Remember" list for 2006. Her second memoir, Have You Found Her, was published by Villard/Random House in 2008; it details her return to the shelter as an adult volunteer, and the deep relationship she forged with a brilliant, damaged girl she called "Samantha."

She has also contributed, in recent years, to McSweeneys.org, Nerve.com, and Nextbook.

=== Nonfiction ===
- Girlbomb: A Halfway Homeless Memoir (2006) [UK edition: The Runaway]
- Have You Found Her (2008)

=== Novels ===
- I, Liar (2015, Thought Catalog Books)
- Lucky Little Things (2018, Farrar, Straus and Giroux)
- Let Me Fix That For You (2019, Farrar, Straus and Giroux)

== Other work and activism ==
In 1996, she was hired at dot com art factory Pseudo.com (subject of the documentary We Live in Public), and rose to the position of Executive Producer before departing in 1999. Janice was the Editor-at-Large at POPsmear magazine and a contributor to BUST magazine from 1994 through 2007.

She served on the board of Girls Write Now, an organization that pairs at-risk high school girls with writing mentors, and volunteered at GEMS, which serves girls who have been commercially sexually exploited. From 2010 to 2012, she was on the board of Bowery Arts & Sciences/Bowery Poetry Club. As of June 2015, Erlbaum is teaching memoir writing, and continues to address audiences at colleges, bookstores, coffee houses, and theaters across the US.
