= First Person (2000 TV series) =

American TV series

First Person is an American TV series produced and directed by Errol Morris. The show engaged a varied group of individuals from civil advocates to criminals, and ran for two seasons, in 2000–2001.

Interviews were conducted with "The Interrotron", a device similar to a teleprompter: Errol and his subject each sit facing a camera. The image of each person's face is then projected onto a two-way mirror positioned in front of the lens of the other's camera. Instead of looking at a blank lens, then, both Morris and his subject are looking directly at a human face. (Diagram) Morris believes that the machine encourages monologue in the interview process, while also encouraging the interviewees to "express themselves to camera".

The name "Interrotron" was coined by Morris's wife, who, according to Morris, "liked the name because it combined two important concepts — terror and interview." The Interrotron was later used by Morris for his 2003 film The Fog of War.

The first episode of the series was dedicated to debtor's advocate Andrew Capoccia, wherein he laid out his philosophy on debt reduction. Less than two days after the episode aired, on February 18, 2000, the chief judge of the U.S. District Court in Rochester court announced the provisional suspension of all pending cases filed by Andrew Capoccia's firm. Cappocia was subsequently tried, convicted of fraud and imprisoned.

== Episodes ==
=== Season 1 ===
1. "Stairway to Heaven" — Temple Grandin, autistic college professor and expert on humane cattle slaughter techniques
2. "The Killer Inside Me" — Sondra London, American true crime author.
3. "I Dismember Mama" — Saul Kent, promoter of cryogenic immortality
4. "The Stalker" — Bill Kinsley, employer and victim of the disgruntled postal worker Thomas McIlvane
5. "The Parrot" — Jane Gill, victim of a murder with a possible avian eyewitness
6. "Eyeball to Eyeball" — Clyde Roper, authority on the giant squid
7. "Smiling in a Jar" — Gretchen Worden, director of the Mütter Museum of medical oddities in Philadelphia
8. "In the Kingdom of the Unabomber" — Gary Greenberg, Unabomber pen pal and would-be biographer
9. "Mr. Debt" — Andrew Capoccia, lawyer for credit-card debtors
10. "You're Soaking In It" — Joan Dougherty, crime scene cleaner
11. "The Little Gray Man" — Antonio Mendez, retired CIA operative and master of disguise

=== Season 2 ===
1. "Harvesting Me" — Josh Harris, internet entrepreneur and television addict also featured in the documentary We Live in Public
2. "The Smartest Man in the World" — Chris Langan, bar bouncer with the alleged world's highest IQ
3. "The Only Truth" — Murray Richman, lawyer to New York mobsters
4. "One in a Million Trillion" — Rick Rosner, professional high school student and Who Wants to Be a Millionaire? contestant
5. "Mr. Personality" — Dr. Michael Stone, forensic psychologist and homicide aficionado, host of Most Evil
6. "Leaving the Earth" — Denny Fitch, DC-10 pilot and one of the heroes onboard United Airlines Flight 232
