= Streetsound =

Canadian music magazine

Streetsound Magazine
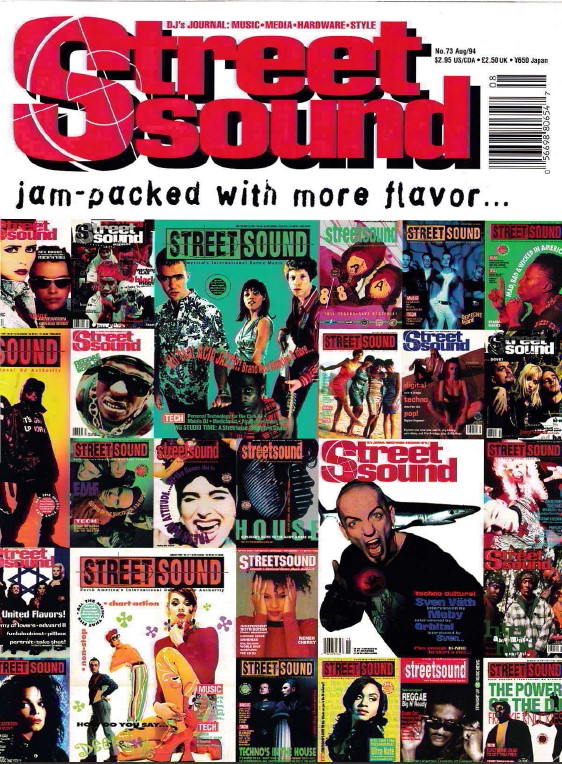
- Editor: Mike Mannix
- Categories: Dance music
- Frequency: Monthly
- Circulation: 20,000
- Publisher: Streetsound Ltd.
- First issue: March 1985
- Final issue Number: 1998; 91
- Country: Canada & United States
- Based in: Toronto & New York City
- Language: English
- Website: streetsound.com
- ISSN: 0841-2650

Streetsound was a Canadian monthly music magazine (often confused with the UK record label Streetsounds). It began publication in 1985 and ceased publication after issue 91 in New York in 1998. Streetsound originally started out as a promotion tool for Starsound Records, a record store owned by Ahmad and Sepehr Azari in Toronto, Ontario Canada. Its executive director was Michael Mannix and Creative Director was Sylvie Falar. Copyright was attributed to Streetsound Ltd with an ISDN number of 0841–2650.,
While Streetsound was primarily known for its dance music coverage, Mannix and Falar mandated that it would cover all genres, from Rock to Bhangra. Its issues and web archives are often sited today as source reporting for articles on music cultural and history.

== History ==
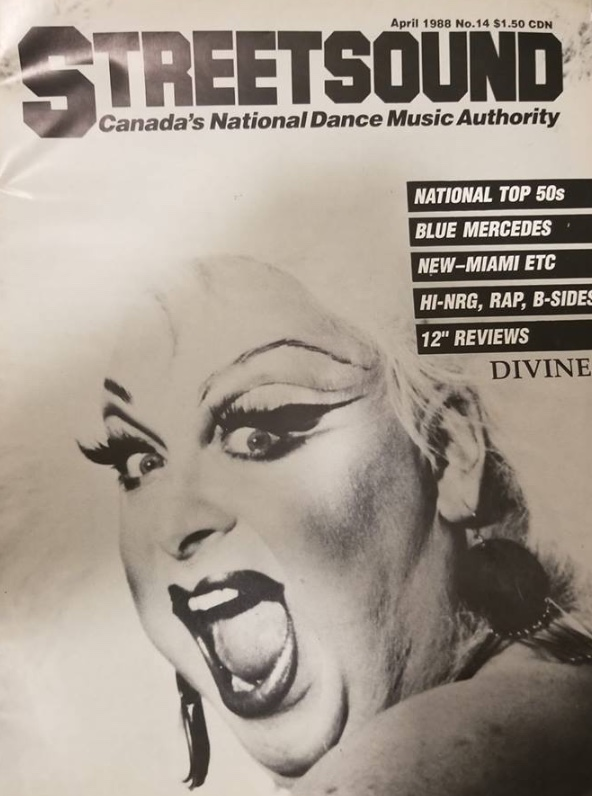
Issue 14 of Streetsound Magazine

1985 Streetsound began as a tip sheet for Starsound Records, a record store owned by brothers Ahmad and Sepehr Azari in Toronto, Ontario. Toronto DJ Jason “Deko” Steele was hired by Publisher Sepehr to expand the tip sheet into a magazine. Steele recommended Montreal natives Mannix and Falar, who worked at Canadian pop culture magazine Graffiti, to run the magazines day-to-day operations.

Launched in 1985 as Streetsound: Canada's Dance Music Authority, the first issue featured Janet Jackson on the cover. It was originally published as a photocopied 8 pages tipsheet run from the Starsound Records office at the back of the store located at 427 Yonge street. As the publication grew in circulation, Chris Torella and Midori Mannix joined as Managing Editor and Editorial Coordinator and Streetsound moved to offices at Queen and Spadina in Toronto (1993).

- 1990 Streetsound thanked as a source in Spin Magazine's December 1990 article, “House Music Map of the World”, one of the first articles on the subject from a mainstream American media outlet.
- In 1992 Streetsound acquired Dance Music Report, a biweekly U.S. trade magazine oriented toward nightclub and radio DJs in the dance music industry.
- 1992, Streetsound's Guide To House Music (volume #1 Issue 59, written by Toronto DJs Dino and Terry and Torella, first published. It would later be used as source material in many other written histories on the subject, including the books, “Traces of the Spirit: The Religious Dimensions of Popular Music” (2002) and “Trance Formation The Spiritual and Religious Dimensions of Global Rave Culture” (2013) and Global Rhetoric, Transnational Markets and, The (post)modern Trajectories of Electronic Dance Music.
- 1993 Streetsound moves its headquarters to the US, sharing office space with Moby's management company, MCT Management.
- 1995 Streetsound moves to the Eightball Records office space, and launched the web version of Streetsound, Streetsound.com
  . It gains recognition in the electronic and rap music communities.
- 1997-98 Josh Harris's Pseudo.com, the online streaming content service, acquires Streetsound. Starts dedicated Streetsound Channel, Shows included "freQ (techno), Desi Vibe(Bhangra), Global House (House) and Velocity (Jungle).
- 1998 Streetsound ceases print publication in 1998 with issue #91.
- 2000 Managing Editor Chris Torella participated in the Billboard Magazine sponsored panel; “The Future of the Future of Marketing Promotion and Distribution on the Internet”
- 2000 Pseudo.com declares bankruptcy – end of Streetsound.com.
- 2020 Streetsound Magazine Archive site launches.

== Contributors ==
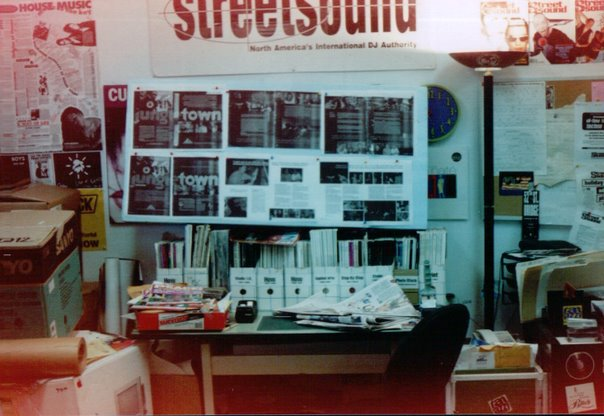
Streetsound Office circa 1999

=== Publishers and directors (circa 1992) ===
Original Publishers Streetsound Ltd: Ahmad and Sepehr Azari 1995-1998: Street Media Ventures inc

executive director: Mike Mannix, Creative Director: Sylvie Falar, Managing Editor: Chris Torella, Editorial Coordinator: Midori Mannix

=== Department editors (circa 1992) ===
John (Bronski) Adams (Rap), Randy Brill (Pop Dance), Lorrie Edmonds (Rock), Morgan Gerrard (editor at large), Patrick Hodge (Soul/Funk/R&B), Sylvain Houde (Alternative), Tim Jeffery (UK), Peter Ivalis (Freestyle), Rockie Laporte (B-sides), Paul E. Lopes (Acid Jazz) Dave Long, Charles McGlynn (reggae), Brian Perry (HI-NRG), Chris Torella, Dino & Terry Demopoulos (House) Editorial Consultant: the late Jason “Deko” Steele Pavlick

=== Notable contributors ===
Craig “Big C” Mannix, Frankie Bones(Techno Rave Report), Thrust DJ Disciple (House), Scott Hardkiss (San Francisco),
