= Girls Write Now =

Girls Write Now is a nonprofit organization serving girls and gender-expansive youth who attend New York City public schools and are from historically and systemically underserved communities. It was founded by Maya Nussbaum, now executive director, in 1998 during her senior year at Columbia University. As part of its core mentoring program, Girls Write Now matches young women from disadvantaged backgrounds who are interested in writing with professional women writers. In 2009, the Girls Write Now mentoring program was recognized by the President's Committee on the Arts and Humanities as an outstanding arts program for youth, and it received the Coming Up Taller Award.

== Programs ==
=== Mentoring program ===
Girls Write Now mentors and mentees meet once a week to work on their writing, following the organization's aim to create a space and support system for girls' development as women and writers. The pieces the pairs work on are incorporated into mentees' writing portfolios, which are edited by the girls' mentors and submitted for publication.

=== Writing workshops ===
Throughout the year, mentors and their mentees participate in genre-based group writing workshops, in which guest speakers talk about their craft and lead the group in writing exercises. The theme of each workshop shapes the development of mentees' six-genre writing portfolios.

=== CHAPTERS reading series ===
The Girls Write Now CHAPTERS Reading Series features original mentee work alongside guest speakers. Guest speakers from the 2011 CHAPTERS series included Kate Christensen, author of The Astral, and Emma Straub, author of Other People We Married. As the New York Times reported, these readings are often the first opportunity mentees get to read their own words in front of an audience: "'I was so nervous when I stepped onstage,' recalled PinChang, a junior at Flushing International High School. 'I was shaking. But now I feel like I can say or do anything.'”

=== Anthology ===
Girls Write Now releases an annual anthology, which includes at least one piece of writing from each mentee and mentor.

=== College Bound ===
College Bound is a series of workshops, tutorials, aimed at helping participants navigate the college application process.

== People ==
In 2010, Girls Write Now Founder and executive director, Maya Nussbaum, was named as one of the Feminist Press's "40 Under 40" women who are the future of feminism. In 2016, she was named a White House Champion of Change. She remains executive director today.

Mentors are women in the professional writing field, such as mentor alumna Susan Sojourna Collier, television writer and playwright.

Janice Erlbaum, NY-based slam poet and author, has served on the Girls Write Now Board of Directors, along with author Tayari Jones.

== Awards ==
In November 2009, Girls Write Now received the Coming Up Taller Award (now the National Arts and Humanities Youth Program Award) from the President's Committee on the Arts and Humanities.

Girls Write Now was featured as part of the "Making a Difference" series on NBC Nightly News with Brian Williams in April 2009. In 2008, the organization received a Union Square Arts Award for its mentoring program.
