= Brand: A Second Coming =

- Directed by: Ondi Timoner
- Written by: Ondi Timoner
- Starring: Russell Brand
- Cinematography: Svetlana Cvetko, Ondi Timoner
- Edited by: Tim Rush, David Timoner, Ondi Timoner, Clay Zimmerman
- Production companies: Mayfair Film Partnership, Interloper Films
- Release date: 15 March 2015 (South by Southwest)
- Running time: 104 minutes
- Country: England
- Language: English

Brand: A Second Coming, also called BRAND: The Film, is a 2015 English documentary film about comedian Russell Brand directed by Ondi Timoner. The film documents Brand's transformation from a comedian to activist over the past five years. It debuted at the 2015 South by Southwest festival in March, but elicited some controversy as Brand declined to attend the premiere and is reportedly unhappy with the film.

== About ==
Brand: A Second Coming documents Brand's journey from a troubled youth in Essex to a Hollywood star to an activist encouraging social, spiritual and economic revolution. The official website describes the film as following "Russell Brand as he dives headlong into drugs, sex and fame in an attempt to find happiness, only to realize we have all been nurtured on bad ideas and empty celebrity idols."

Timoner was reportedly the sixth director attached to the documentary; the late Albert Maysles was one of her predecessors who worked on the film, and Brand himself had tried to direct the documentary.

It is Timoner's second Russell Brand documentary, the first being a short feature entitled Russell Brands the Bird, which was released in 2014.

The genesis of the film was a documentary about Happiness in 2009, with Brand as the sole subject. The film then expanded as Brand himself transformed from appearing in the movie Forgetting Sarah Marshall, and then edging more towards social activism. The film documents transformation but also looks back at his early career, including the "Sachsgate" controversy, notorious in the UK but less known in the U.S.

Timoner spent two and a half years on the project. The documentary includes interviews and footage of Brand's intimate circle, including his parents Barbara and Ron Brand, manager John Noel, friends Noel Gallagher, Jonathan Ross, Matt Morgan, Gareth Roy, and his ex-wife Katy Perry. Brand interviews a group of celebrities on the topic of spirituality, including Rosie O'Donnell, Oliver Stone, Mike Tyson, David Lynch, Ben Dunn and Daniel Pinchbeck.

== Release ==
Brand: A Second Coming premiered at the 2015 South by Southwest Festival (SXSW) in Austin, Texas. Brand had been scheduled to be the keynote speaker at SXSW but canceled his appearance. The film presented a positive view of Brand, but he was unhappy with the result, saying he found it "oddly intrusive and melancholy," and reportedly asked for it not to be screened. It was screened at SXSW and Timoner did a Q&A session at the premiere.

The DVD pre-order included a bundle with the 15-minute short, Russell Brands the Bird.

== Critical reception ==
Though the film received largely positive reviews overall from its premiere at SXSW, some of the critics also expressed mixed reactions. Kevin Polowy of Yahoo! Movies tweeted praise for the film from SXSW, "Just like its subject, Russell Brand, pretty much every second spent with the doc 'Brand: A Second Coming' is absolutely fascinating."

Dennis Harvey in Variety called it an engaging portrait that would be well received by Brand's fans, but predicted it would do little to alter the perception of Brand by his critics. Harvey wrote, "Though it runs a full two hours, Brand: A Second Coming is never dull, moving at a busy clip appropriate to its seemingly tireless globe-trotting protagonist." Harvey also praised the editors who compiled the years of footage, "pulling a mountain of material into viable shape."

Charlie Schmidlin from Indiewire gave the film an A−, but agreed with Harvey that the film's third act was weak. Schmidlin praised the director for tackling the many layers of the film, writing, "Timoner swirls this concoction of travelogue, interviews, and archival footage into a fast-paced, often hilarious, knowingly indulgent piece, and one that entertains the craziest political and comedic ideas while dissecting the ones already fixed."
