= All the Walls Came Down =

2025 American short documentary film

- Release poster
- Directed by: Ondi Timoner
- Written by: Ondi Timoner
- Produced by: Ondi Timoner; Eli O. Timoner; Maggie Contreras
- Starring: Ondi Timoner; Randy Vance; David Timoner; Heavenly Hughes; Ranell Wormley; Rupert Garcia; Aloe Blacc; Kathryn Barger; Juki Timoner; Judy Chu
- Cinematography: Elle Schneider; Jackson James; Jendra Jarnigan; Nicholas Kraus; Eli O. Timoner
- Edited by: Ondi Timoner; Jesse Gordon
- Music by: Morgan Doctor
- Production company: Interloper Films
- Release date: August 31, 2025 (Telluride)
- Running time: 39 minutes
- Country: United States
- Language: English

All the Walls Came Down is a 2025 American documentary short film, directed by Ondi Timoner. The film had its world premiere at the 52nd Telluride Film Festival on August 31, 2025. It was shortlisted for the Best Documentary Short Film at the 98th Academy Awards.

== Synopsis ==
After losing her Altadena, California, home in the January 2025 Southern California wildfires,Timoner turns the camera on herself and her neighbors as she returns to find her town in ruins and neighbors facing displacement. The film captures the efforts of the Altadena community, led by activist Heavenly Hughes, to preserve Altadena's historic black community, and the many logistical and emotional hurdles survivors face in recovering from the Eaton Fire. All the Walls Came Down is both a personal story of loss and a portrait of a community's solidarity and resilience in the wake of catastrophe.

== Cast ==
- Ondi Timoner
- Morgan Doctor
- Randy Vance
- David Timoner
- Ranell Wormley
- LaPorsche Wormley
- Heavenly Hughes
- Rupert Garcia
- Sunny Mills
- Aloe Blacc
- Kathryn Barger
- Judy Chu

== Release ==
All the Walls Came Down had its world premiere at the 52nd Telluride Film Festival on August 31, 2025. The film had its East Coast Premiere at the Woodstock Film Festival on October 17, 2025. On November 13, 2025, it was screened in the Short List: Shorts – Records of Then and Now at Doc NYC along with other three films. The Los Angeles Times featured three films including All the Walls Came Down from The Times' Short Docs 2025 slate on December 3, 2025, presented by Canon Inc., at the Culver Theater in Culver City, California in a "For Your Consideration" showcase. On January 7, 2026, the Los Angeles Times released All the Walls Came Down on its documentary streaming platform.

== See also ==
- Academy Award for Best Documentary Short Film
- Submissions for Best Documentary Short Academy Award
