= Dennis E. Fitch =

Dennis E. Fitch, Sr.
- Born: December 19, 1942; Pittsburgh, Pennsylvania, US
- Died: May 7, 2012 (aged 69); St. Charles, Illinois, US
- Education: Duquesne University
- Occupation: Pilot
- Employer: United Airlines
- Known for: United Airlines Flight 232 incident, Motivational speaking
- Spouse(s): Gene Anne Fitch; Rosa Rannels Fitch

Dennis Edward "Denny" Fitch, Sr. (December 19, 1942 – May 7, 2012) was an American commercial airline pilot. He was best known for his critical actions as an off-duty McDonnell Douglas DC-10 training captain who helped captain Al Haynes minimize loss of life on United Airlines Flight 232, when all flight controls were lost, on July 19, 1989. Fitch used differential throttle adjustment to steer the airliner to an oblique crash-landing at Sioux Gateway Airport, in Sioux City, Iowa, resulting in the survival of 185 out of 296 on board. Eighteen months after the crash, in which he was injured, he returned to flying duties with United Airlines.

== Biography ==
He was commended by then-President George H. W. Bush and in Senate Resolution 174 of the 101st United States Congress, as a result of his feat.

A safety consultant to NASA as a member of the Aerospace Safety Advisory Panel, he was also president of his own aviation consulting firm, specializing in Cockpit Resource Management and human factors, and gave motivational presentations to corporate groups and associations on teamwork, drawing on his experience on Flight 232.

He was formerly a pilot in the Air National Guard, and attended Duquesne University and graduated with a Bachelor of Science degree.

Fitch was interviewed by Errol Morris about United Airlines Flight 232 for the documentary series First Person. He also appeared on episodes of Mayday, Seconds from Disaster and Survival in the Sky that featured United Airlines Flight 232.

Fitch was diagnosed with brain cancer in January 2010, and died on May 7, 2012, at his home in St. Charles, Illinois., with his wife Rosa by his side. She is a flight attendant.
