= Josh Harris (entrepreneur) =

American businessman (born c. 1960)

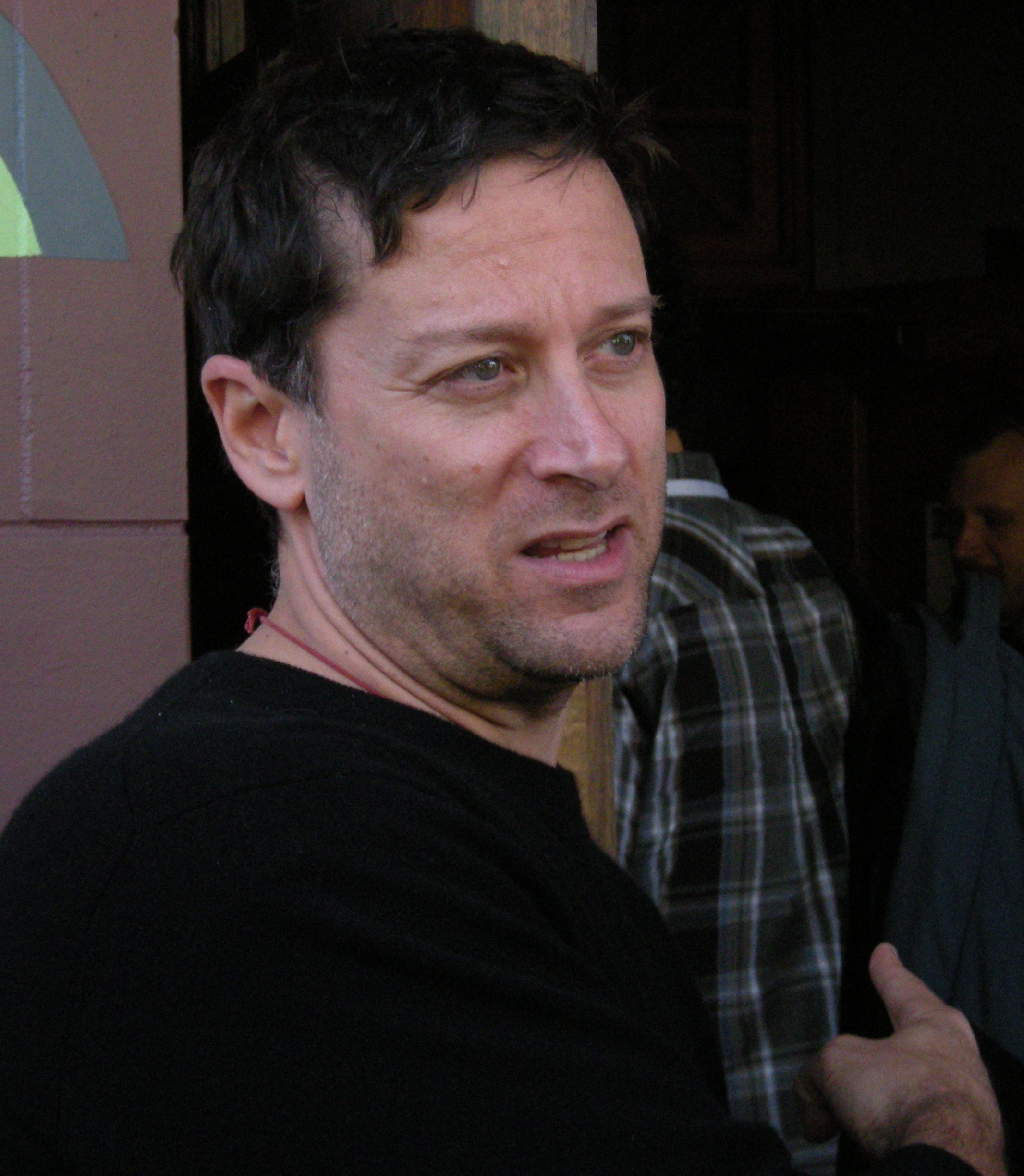
- Harris in 2009
- Born: c. 1960
- Occupation: Internet entrepreneur

Josh Harris (born c. 1960) is an American Internet entrepreneur. He was the founder of JupiterResearch and Pseudo.com, a live audio and video webcasting website founded in 1993. In 2000, it would file for bankruptcy following the dot-com bubble. According to Wired, he "may have been the first internet millionaire in New York," where "he rode the web 1.0 dotcom boom to a fortune of $85 million," and then lost all his money.

== Early life ==
Josh Harris was born circa 1960. He grew up in Ventura, California. His father worked for the Central Intelligence Agency (CIA) while his mother was a social worker. He has three brothers and three sisters.

Harris majored in communications at UC San Diego and later was a graduate student at the University of Southern California's (USC) Annenberg School for Communication.

== Career ==
Harris founded the technology market research consulting firm Jupiter Communications, now known as JupiterResearch, in 1986. An initial public offering in 1999 raised $65.6 million.

=== Pseudo ===
In 1993, Harris founded Pseudo Programs, which started out netcasting 40 radio programs and throwing parties, and grew into an "online television network." In the SoHo Pseudo offices at the corner of Houston and Broadway, Harris, sometimes dressed as an ersatz Luvy from Gilligan's Island, would throw parties, often raided by the police and fire department, attracting an array of artists who would come to work for Pseudo, "a paid playland," eventually developing channels dominated by electronic music and hip-hop.

Funded by Intel, the Tribune Company, Prospect Street Ventures, and Prodigy, under Harris' leadership as Chairman Pseudo "burned through $32 million in two years," more than "$2 million in cash a month," and was seen as emblematic of the dot-com excesses as it "fabulously flamed out." CEO Larry Lux left in 1999 after disagreements with Harris. Lux raised $20 million during a nine-month tenure where he introduced more mainstream content. Former CNNfn executive, David Bohrman, was brought in as CEO in 2000 to ready the company for an initial public offering. Bohrman raised $14 million in funding led by LVMH Moet-Hennessey Louis Vuitton's media group, Desfosses International, but "was unable to secure a $40 million round of investments that would have kept Pseudo afloat." In September 2001 the company filed for Chapter 11 bankruptcy protection. In early 2001 it was bought in bankruptcy court by INTV for $2 million.

Harris owned and operated Livingston Orchards, LLC, a commercial apple farm in Columbia County, New York from 2001 to 2006. He was subsequently the CEO of the African Entertainment Network, based in the Sidamo region of Ethiopia., where he lived after leaving New York.

=== We Live in Public ===
Harris' art project Quiet: We Live in Public, an Orwellian, Big Brother concept with "a neo-fascistic element," developed in the late '90s, placed more than 100 volunteers in a three-story loft on Broadway in New York City. There were 110 surveillance cameras capturing every move, and "every “resident” had their own channel through which to watch each other. Harris proclaimed, “Everything is free, except your image. That we own.”" Alanna Heiss, then the director of the P.S. 1 Contemporary Art Center in Queens, was among those who moved in, calling it "one of the most extraordinary activities I've ever attended anywhere in the world." The project was forced to shut down on January 1, 2000, by order of the New York Police Department.

A few months later, Harris started weliveinpublic.com, a project that entailed himself and his then girlfriend, Tanya Corrin, living at home under 24-hour internet surveillance viewable by anyone. After a few months Corrin separated from Harris and the project, citing mental and emotional stress. Harris continued "living in public" for a few more weeks, finally ending the site due to the mental, personal, and financial losses the project caused him.

On the Swedish TV show Kobra, Harris stated that he had been widely influenced by the 1998 film The Truman Show. He strongly believes that the technological singularity will be reached and the human being will cease to be an individual, while the machine becomes the new king of the jungle.

In 2001, an episode of director Errol Morris' First Person television series centered on Harris and the weliveinpublic.com project. Harris was the focus of director Ondi Timoner's documentary film, We Live in Public, an entry at the 2009 Sundance Film Festival that was awarded the Grand Jury Prize award in the US documentary category.

=== Other projects ===
Harris was the CEO of The Wired City, an internet television network which would allow viewers to interact with each other, based in New York City. In 2011, he ran a Kickstarter crowdfunding campaign to resurrect The Wired City.

In 2011, he made a pitch to run the MIT Media Lab promoting technological singularity.

As of 2016, he believes he is under surveillance by the FBI over his ties to 2001's The B-Thing, a covert art installation by gelitin, possibly a hoax, of a balcony on the 91st floor of the World Trade Center.

In 2019, Harris was a contributor to the Cam-Life exhibition at the Museum of Sex.

== Personal life ==
Harris resides in Las Vegas, Nevada.
