= Eli Timoner =

American businessman (1928–2021)

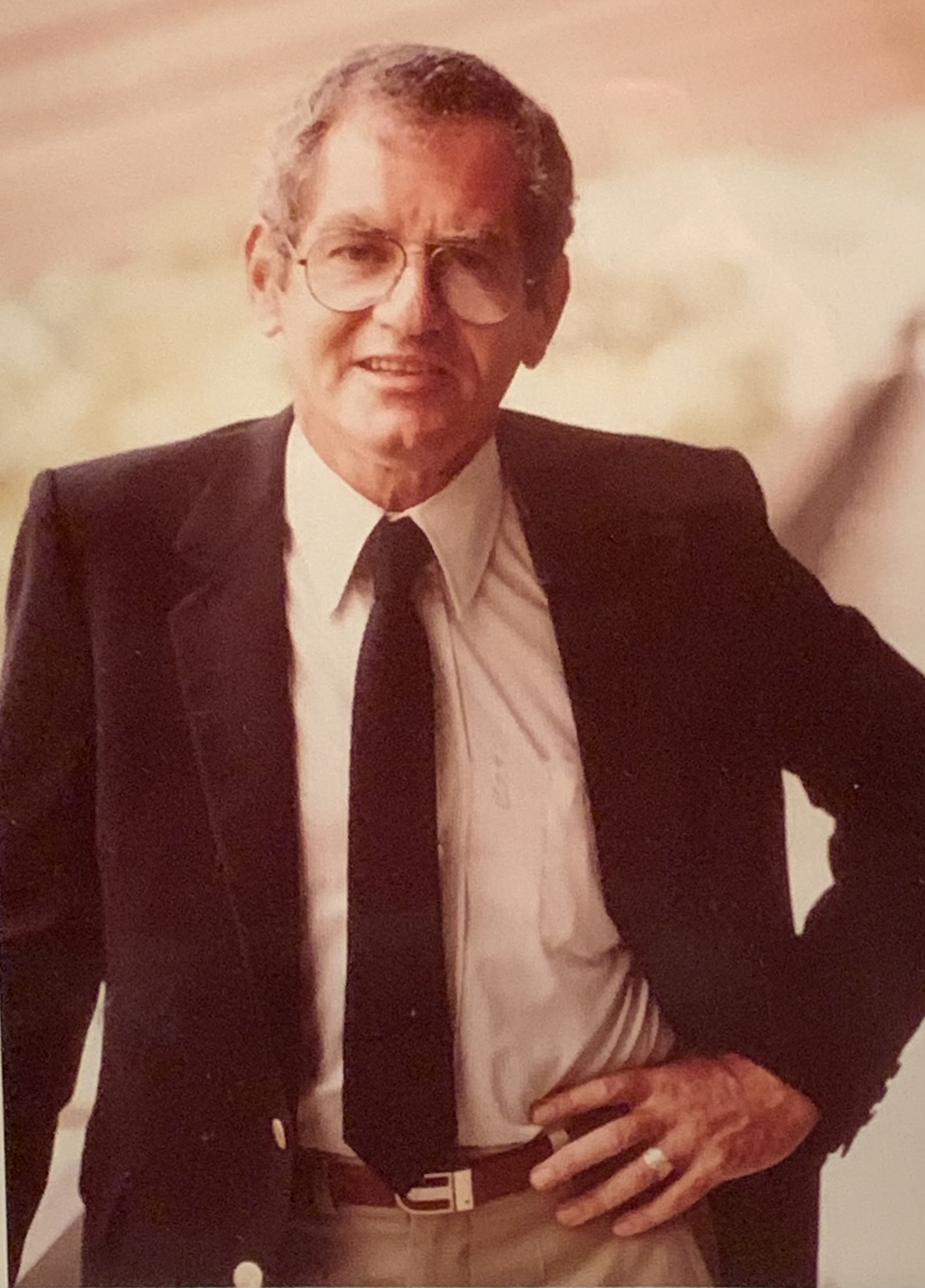
- Born: December 12, 1928; Woodmere, New York, U.S.
- Died: March 3, 2021 (aged 92); Los Angeles, California, U.S.
- Cause of death: Assisted suicide
- Education: University of Miami
- Occupations: Business executive, founder, CEO and Chairman of Air Florida
- Years active: 1950 - 1984
- Spouse: Elissa (Doane) Timoner
- Children: 3, including Ondi

Eli Timoner (December 12, 1928 – March 3, 2021) was an American entrepreneur and business executive most notable for creating Air Florida in the 1970s. Timoner's death in 2021 under California's End of Life Option Act was filmed by his daughter and formed the basis of the feature documentary Last Flight Home.

== Early life and education ==
Eli Timoner was the son of Benjamin and Rae Timoner. Benjamin J. Timoner had emigrated to New York from Russia when he was 12 and began working in the retail business in 1920. Timoner was one of seven siblings. Despite being a first generation immigrant, Benjamin Timoner held a number of prominent positions including president of Lane's Department Store chain, vice president of Lerner's stores and board member of Giffen Industries. The couple had three children: Murray, Eli and Bert.

Eli Timoner was raised in Woodmere, Long Island and earned a BA in Business Administration from the University of Miami in 1950. While studying in Miami, Timoner was vice president of the Tau Epsilon Phi fraternity.

== Career ==
=== Laura Lee Candy Company ===
After working as a Bloomingdale's management trainee for a year in New York following graduation, Timoner borrowed $100,000 to purchase a controlling interest in Laura Lee Candies. Within nine years, he grew the company from annual sales of $1 million to $5 million when it was sold in 1963.

=== Giffen Industries ===
Giffen Industries was a publicly-held regional roofing company based in Miami when Timoner joined the board in 1961 to start a turnaround process.

Three years later, the company was showing a profit and Timoner was serving as president. He quickly moved to expand the company by creating two subsidiaries, Giffen Roofing and Giffen-Bird Realty, both based in Miami.

In 1966 Giffen acquired Atlantic Aluminum Distributors, Inc. for more than $1 million in an all-debt transaction and Space Industries, Inc, for more than $500,000. The publicly-held company reported sales of $6.2 million in 1966.

A year later Giffen added a new subsidiary called Plastics, Inc., by taking over distribution of U.S. Plastics, Inc. which had facilities in Miami, Tampa, Orlando, Atlanta, New Orleans and Lafayette, Louisiana.

Within three years, Timoner turned Giffen into a national conglomerate with diverse manufacturing and distribution divisions involved in products as diverse as laminated plastics, aluminum canoes, aerospace hardware and snowmobiles. By 1968, the company's headcount had grown from 300 to nearly 3,000 and Timoner, as president and chairman, personally held stock valued in excess of $14 million.

By 1969, Timoner was earning a salary of $42,000 as the president of Giffen and set out to purchase a controlling stake in Keller Industries for $60 a share in a transaction valued at $50 million. In the weeks following the announcement of the transaction, the share price of Keller dropped significantly, Giffen sought to exit the transaction. In response to the volatile stock price, Timoner and the CEO of Keller were asked to appear before the New York Stock Exchange.

Timoner resigned from Giffen in December 1970 following a $10.4 million loss due, in part, to the sale of the Stewart-Warner Corp and the abortive attempt to take over Keller Industries Inc. At the time of his departure, Timoner had grown the company into a major conglomerate with more than $140 million in annual sales. Timoner remained with the firm as a management consultant and retained a significant amount of stock following the sale.

=== Air Florida ===
Frustrated at not being able to travel within Florida for his various business interests, Timoner hatched the idea for Air Florida in 1972 as an intrastate carrier serving Miami, Tampa and Orlando.

Started as a Florida commuter airline, Air Florida took advantage of industry deregulation laws to tap the lucrative routes to Florida vacation spots from East Coast and Midwest cities. The airline was first allowed to fly outside Florida in November 1978, and it quickly became one of the fastest-growing carriers.

For more than a decade, Air Florida used extravagant marketing and deep discounts to become a major commercial air carrier by undercutting larger airlines with fares from New York to Miami for $50.

“Our success has been one fare, unrestricted, very clearly defined. Everybody knows what it is. The public really understands no gimmicks and straight talk.”

Timoner ceded the role of chairman to Edward Acker in 1977.

On the afternoon of January 13, 1982, Air Florida Flight 90 crashed into the 14th Street Bridge in Washington, D.C., and into the Potomac River, killing 78. Weeks later, Timoner, then 53, suffered a stroke that left him unable to walk without the use of a cane.

Facing significant health challenges following the stroke, Timoner retired from Air Florida the following year and was replaced by former American Airlines executive Donald Lloyd-Jones. At the time of his departure, Air Florida reported a $78 million loss.

The airline never recovered from the 1982 crash and was ultimately forced to file for bankruptcy in 1984.

=== Other positions ===
Timoner served on the boards of the Greater Miami Jewish Federation, the Board of Miami's Center for the Fine Arts and the Board of Ransom Everglades School.

In the late 1960s and early 1970s, Timoner was very active in the greater Miami business community serving as a director of the executive committee of the National Children's Cardiac Hospital, a member of the Young Presidents Organizations, a director of the Philharmonic Society Inc., and a member of the advisory board of the Pan American Bank of Miami.

== Personal life ==
With his second wife, Elissa (Lisa), Timoner had three children, Rachel, Andrea (Ondi), and David. Rachel Timoner is the rabbi of Congregation Beth Elohim in Brooklyn. David Timoner is a television producer and film editor. Ondi Timoner is a documentary filmmaker. All three siblings attended Yale University.

=== Health issues and death ===
In July 1982, Timoner was paralyzed on the left side of his body by a sudden stroke at age 53. At the time, he ran two miles a day, played tennis, and maintained a healthy diet. He spent the rest of his life walking unsteadily with a cane.

Timoner was admitted to the hospital in January 2021 with breathing issues. As his health declined, he made the decision to end his own life under California's End of Life Option Act.

Returning home in February 2021, Timoner began a state mandated 15 day waiting period. He died on March 3, 2021.

== Documentary film ==
Timoner's youngest daughter, filmmaker Ondi Timoner, began documenting her father's life in February 2021 as his health began to fail following a hospitalization. The resulting film titled Last Flight Home, had its premier at the Sundance Film Festival in January 2022. Following Sundance, MTV Documentary Films acquired the worldwide rights to Last Flight Home and released it theatrically in the fall of 2022.

=== Awards and honors ===
- Emmy Awards 2023, nominee, (Exceptional Merit In Documentary Filmmaking)
- Oscars 2023, shortlist, (Documentary Feature)
- Cinema Eye Honors Awards 2023
  - nominee, (Audience Choice Prize)
  - The Unforgettables (Non-Competitive Honor)
- Woodstock Film Festival 2022, Winner (Best Documentary Feature)
- Writers Guild of America, USA 2023 nominee (Documentary Screenplay)
- Girls on Film Awards 2023, nominee (Best Documentary Feature)
- Key West Film Festival 2022, winner (Critics' Choice Award)
- Hamptons Doc Fest 2022, winner (Filmmaker Impact Award)
- Dallas International Film Festival 2022, winner (Best Feature Documentary)
- DOC NYC 2022, winner (Robert and Anne Drew Award for Documentary Excellence)
