= We Live in Public =

2009 American documentary film

WE LIVE IN PUBLIC
- Directed by: Ondi Timoner
- Produced by: Ondi Timoner; Keirda Bahruth
- Starring: Josh Harris
- Edited by: Ondi Timoner; Joshua Altman
- Release date: January 19, 2009 (Sundance)
- Country: United States
- Language: English
- Box office: $41,711

We Live In Public is a 2009 documentary film by Ondi Timoner about Internet pioneer Josh Harris, indirectly highlighting the loss of privacy in the Internet age.

== Synopsis ==
The film details the experiences of Josh Harris, a dot-com millionaire who founded Pseudo.com, and who became interested in human experiments testing the effects of media and technology on the development of personal identity. To that end, Harris created the art project "Quiet: We Live in Public", which placed more than one hundred artists in a human terrarium under New York City, with a myriad of webcams following and capturing their every move. Each pod was outfitted by artist Jeff Gompertz with cameras and screens to allow every occupant to monitor every other pod. Following that project, Harris outfitted a loft with 30 surveillance cameras and 66 microphones, broadcasting online his own life with his new girlfriend for a planned 100 days, "becoming the rat in his own experiment". She left and the couple broke up after 81 days.

The film includes commentary from Internet personalities Chris DeWolfe, Jason Calacanis, Douglas Rushkoff, and venture capitalist Fred Wilson, as well as artists and producers involved in the "Quiet: We Live in Public" event such as V. Owen Bush, Jeff Gompertz, Leo Fernekes, Feedbuck, Leo Koenig, Gabriella Latessa, Alex Arcadia, Zeroboy, and Alfredo Martinez.

== Awards ==
We Live in Public was screened six times at the 2009 Sundance Film Festival before being awarded the Grand Jury Prize in the U.S. documentary category. Timoner is the first director in the Sundance Film Festival's history to twice win the Grand Jury Prize for Documentary, having won in 2004 with Dig!. We Live in Public was runner-up for Best Documentary at the 2009 Karlovy Vary International Film Festival.

== Critical response ==
On Rotten Tomatoes, the film has an 81% approval rating, based on 52 reviews. The critics consensus says, "This documentary about Josh Harris' surveillance-as-art project exposes the problems of privacy in the internet age and asks provocative questions about the power of ego in a place where everything is on display." Metacritic, which uses a weighted average, assigned the film a score of 69 out of 100, based on 15 critics, indicating "generally favorable" reviews.

Roger Ebert gave the film four stars, his highest rating, and wrote, "This is a remarkable film about a strange and prophetic man."

Awards
Preceded by Trouble the Water	Sundance Grand Jury Prize: U.S. Documentary; 2009	Succeeded by Restrepo
