= Air Florida =

US intrastate airline (1972–1985)

IATA	ICAO	Call sign
QH	FLA	PALM
- Founded: 4 November 1971
- Commenced operations: 27 September 1972 (as Air Florida); 15 October 1984 (as Air Florida dba Midway Express)
- Ceased operations: 3 July 1984 (as Air Florida); 14 August 1985 (becomes "Midway Airlines (1984)")
- Hubs: Miami
- Fleet size: 29
- Destinations: 99
- Parent company: Air Florida System, Inc.
- Headquarters: Miami-Dade County, Florida
- Key people: Eli Timoner; Ed Acker; Donald Lloyd-Jones

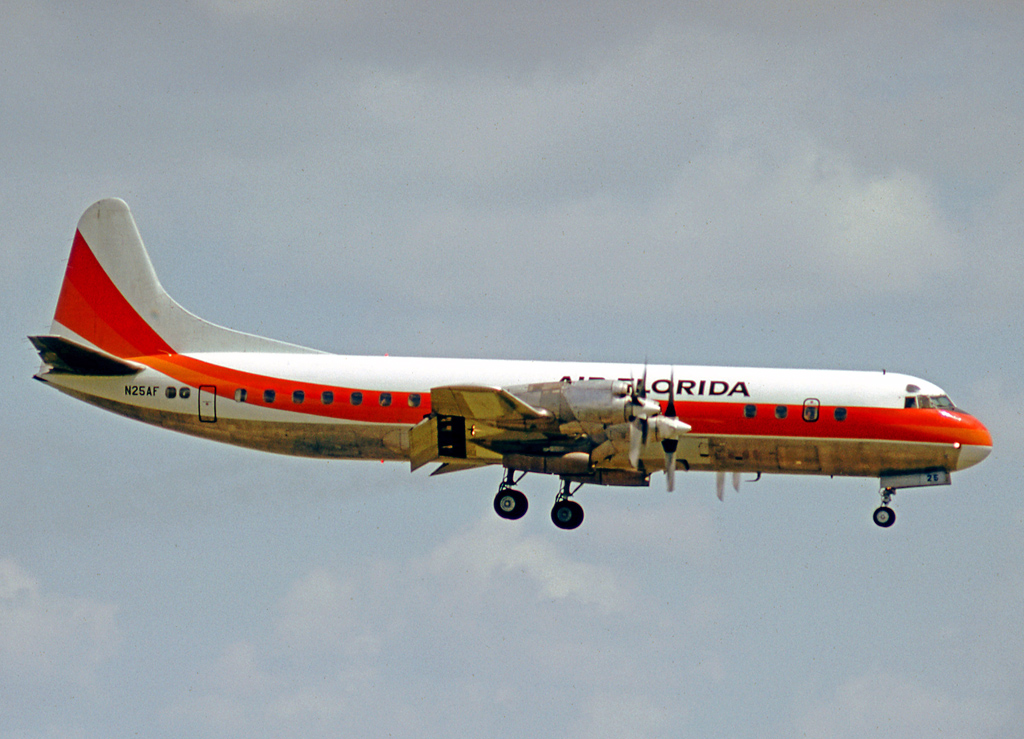
Electra landing at Miami in 1976

Air Florida was an American low-cost carrier that operated under its own brand from 1972 to 1984. During the period from 1972 to 1978 Air Florida was an intrastate airline. Until a high-profile 1982 aircraft crash in Washington DC, Air Florida was considered an early success story of U.S. airline deregulation, having expanded rapidly from its original Florida network, including internationally to Europe and Latin America. After the crash, the airline struggled for over two and a half years before finally succumbing to bankruptcy in 1984.

After being grounded for three months in Chapter 11 bankruptcy, Air Florida flew again for 10 months in 1984 and 1985 under contract to Midway Airlines using the brand "Midway Express", with Midway selling the tickets and doing the marketing. In 1985 it was sold to Midway.

== History ==
=== Intrastate origin ===
Air Florida was based at Miami International Airport. Air Florida was initially organized as an intrastate airline by a group including Miami native Eli Timoner as chairman, Bill Spohrer as president, Jim Woodman as VP, Robert Bussey as Secretary and Reed Cleary as chief pilot. The inspiration was Pacific Southwest Airlines, the long-established California intrastate airline. Spohrer came from Convair 990 operator APSA, which may account for Air Florida's initial focus on a 149-seat Convair 990 as an aircraft, to be leased from Modern Air Transport. Later the focus changed to an Eastern Air Lines DC-8 before settling on a Pan Am Boeing 707 purchased for $1.1mm. The inability to settle on an aircraft delayed Federal Aviation Administration (FAA) approval and thus start of the carrier.

FAA approval was needed for operational authority. As an intrastate airline, Air Florida had no need to obtain the approval of the Civil Aeronautics Board (CAB), the now-defunct federal agency that then tightly economically regulated almost all US air transportation (e.g. as to where an airline could fly, how much it could charge, etc.). Prior to 1972, there was no economic regulation of intrastate carriers in Florida. Such regulation started October 1, 1972. Air Florida, by first flying September 27, was grandfathered, but thereafter, so long as it remained an intrastate airline, Air Florida would be regulated by the Florida Public Service Commission (PSC) as to matters like route entry and fares.

Ted Griffin, a former marketing director of Eastern Air Lines, became operational head from mid 1972, eventually taking the president title. The airline operated its first flights on September 27, 1972, offering twice-daily service in Florida between Miami (MIA), Orlando (MCO) and St. Petersburg (PIE) on "triangle" routings of MIA-MCO-PIE-MIA and MIA-PIE-MCO-MIA with a one way introductory fare of $12.00. By May 15, 1973, the airline acquired three Lockheed Electra turboprop aircraft, replacing the Boeing 707.

=== Acker group investment ===
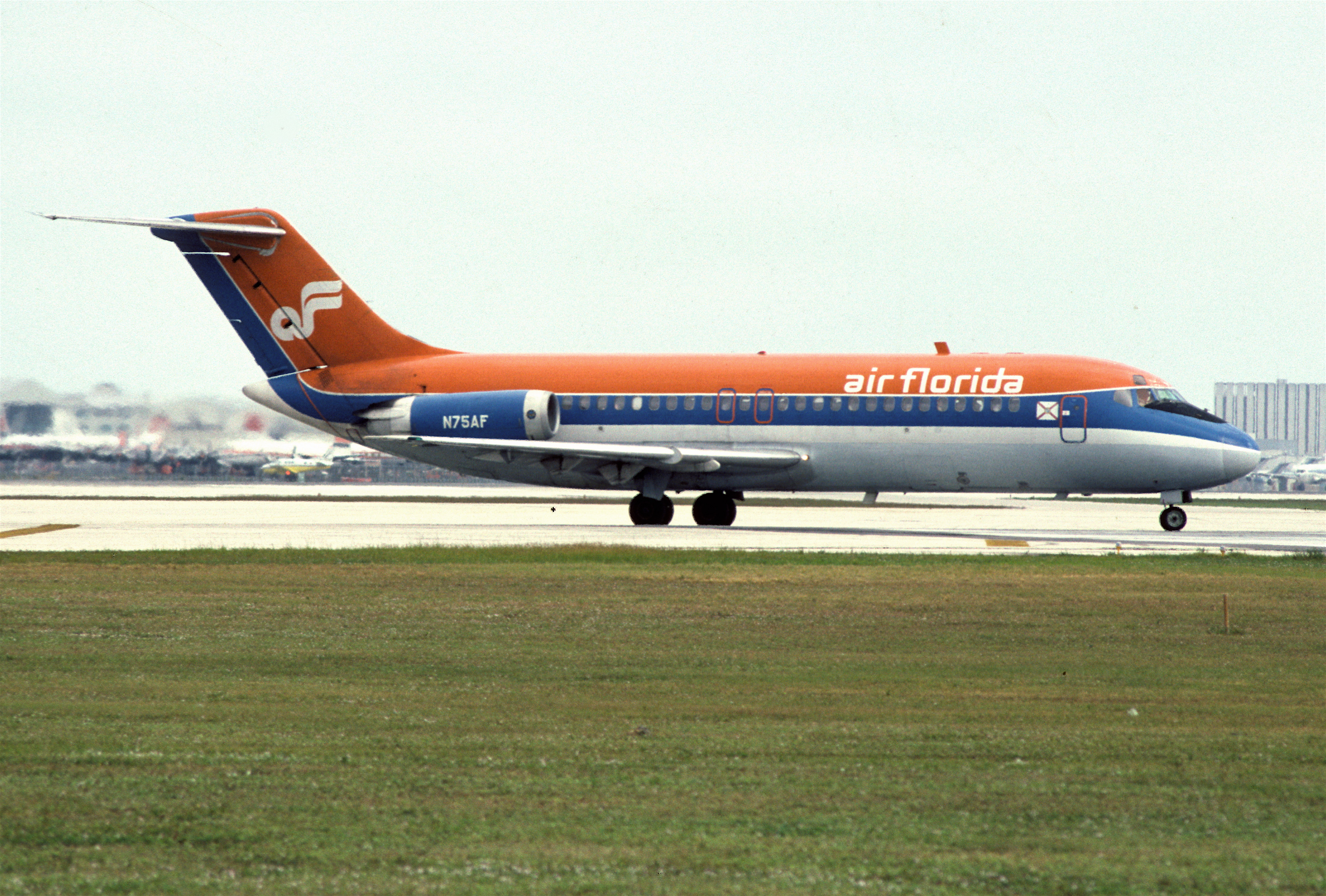
DC-9-15RC in December 1980

Air Florida was unprofitable for most of its intrastate existence. In 1972 it attempted a $3.2mm initial public offering, but the market was unfavorable and it had to withdraw. The airline was acquired by a Timoner-controlled publicly listed company, Investment Property Builders (IPB) as a way to give it a stock price. IPB became Air Florida System, Inc, explaining why Air Florida's holding company had a 1955 date of formation. In 1975, the U.S. Securities and Exchange Commission accused Timoner and a Swiss bank (among others) of manipulating the IPB stock price in 1971. The airline was chronically underfunded and unable to upgrade to jets, which caused some travelers to avoid Air Florida, leaving Timoner scrambling for funds.

In December 1976, an investor group led by Ed Acker, previously a Braniff executive but at that time at an insurance company, led a recapitalization of Air Florida. Acker's group put in $1.5mm, some creditors agreed to take stock in exchange for $2mm in debt, other creditors agreed to a standstill, allowing Air Florida to acquire DC-9 jets. Three DC-9s were financed by Carl Lindner's American Financial Corp, which bought them from Air Canada and leased them to Air Florida in exchange for low-priced stock and warrants that, in early 1980, provided Lindner with a substantial payoff. In mid-1977, Acker became CEO and chairman, Timoner became president and COO, and Ted Griffin left the company. By February 1978, a turnaround was evident. The fleet comprised five DC-9s, with three more on the way. A company tag-line emphasized the change: "All jet. All the time." September 1977 passenger traffic was up 400+%, in October up 600+%, for November 1977 thru January 1978, up over 350%. Year over year call center volume increased over 100%.

Air Florida System, Inc. Financial Results, 1976 thru 1980
USD 000	YE July 31					YE December 31	
USD 000	1976	1977	1978	1979	1980	1979	1980
Operating revenue	4,877	7,814	21,507	44,234	114,285	62,794	161,175
Operating expense	5,230	9,772	21,259	41,025	107,829	58,304	151,771
Operating result	(353)	(1,958)	248	3,209	6,456	4,490	9,404
Operating margin	-7.2%	-25.1%	1.2%	7.3%	5.6%	7.2%	5.8%
Net income	(748)	(2,145)	(109)	2,413	5,070	3,624	5,708
Net margin	-15.3%	-27.5%	-0.5%	5.5%	4.4%	5.8%	3.5%

=== Post intrastate ===
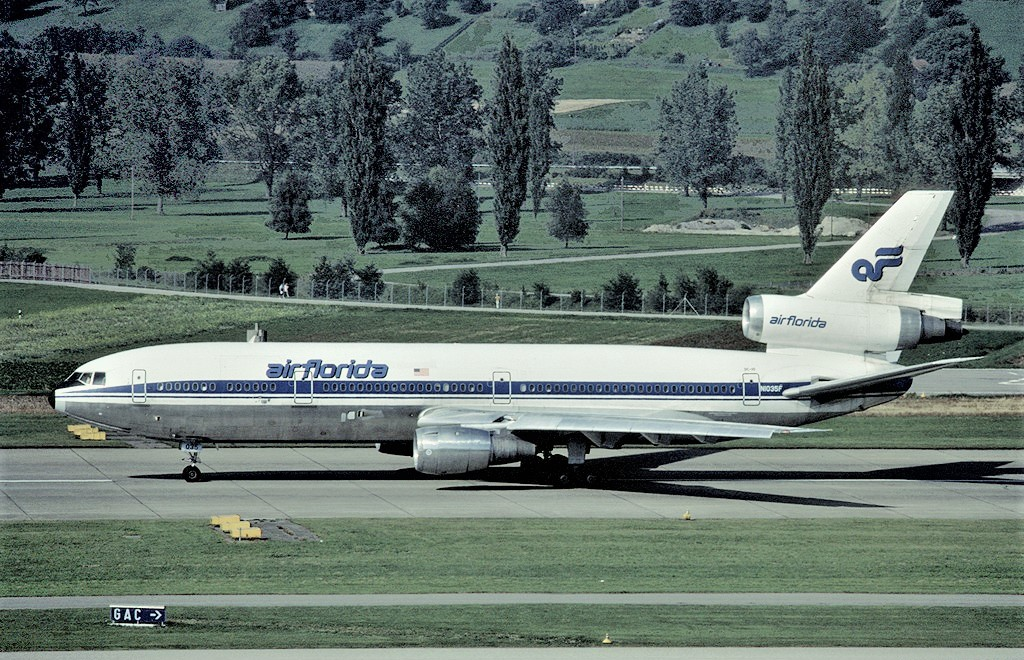
DC-10-30 in 1981

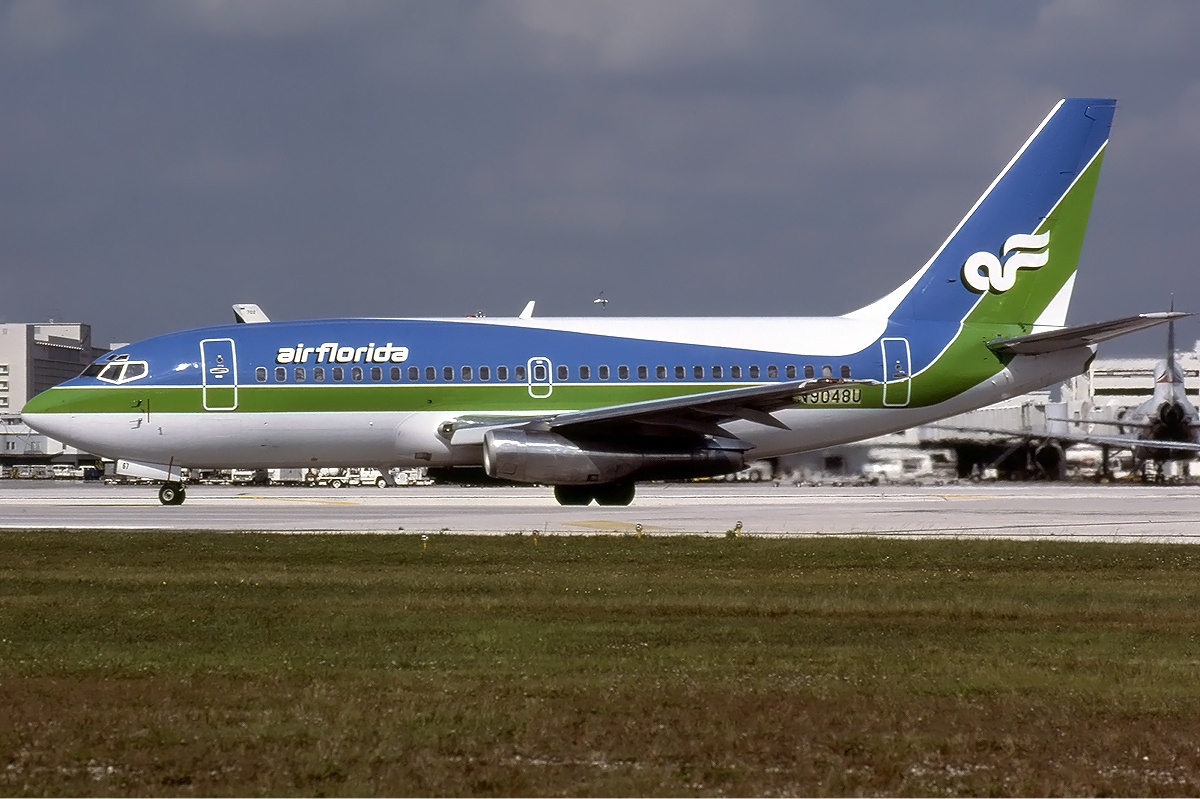
Boeing 737-200 in 1980

In 1978, Congress passed the Airline Deregulation Act, which phased out Federal economic regulation of the airline industry starting in 1979. The CAB relaxed its stance in advance of the effective date and allowed Air Florida to fly to Washington, D.C., and, in the Bahamas, Rock Sound and Nassau by year-end 1978.

No longer confined to its home state, Air Florida under Ed Acker was aggressive:

- Air Florida grew quickly, to the Northeast US, Caribbean, Central America and Europe. European routes required long-haul aircraft, such as DC-8s or DC-10s. By January 1981, the fleet included four DC-9s, 21 737s and a DC-10. The financial turnaround continued, with 1979 and 1980 showing solid profits. 1980 revenues were over five times those of 1978 (see nearby table).
- Air Florida initiated three attempted takeovers of other carriers, two of them materially larger than Air Florida. This was not unusual for the time. Frank Lorenzo's Texas Air was another small carrier that made bids for much larger airlines in the late 1970s and early 1980s.

On August 27, 1981, Ed Acker left Air Florida to take up the CEO position at Pan Am. Timoner again became chairman and CEO.

Air Florida attempted acquisitions
Target	Timeframe	Disposition
Piedmont Airlines	June 1979-March 1981	Bought 4.9% of Piedmont, which refused to engage. Sold stake to help finance Air California bid
Air California	October 1980-May 1981	Bought investor interests in to-be-reorganized Air California parent company, Westgate-California Corporation (WCC), then operating in bankruptcy, giving Air Florida a 26% stake. Won a bidding war for WCC, but the other bidder launched a bid for Air California itself, which Air Florida lost
Western Airlines	July 1981-November 1982	Bought stock in Western in part with WCC proceeds. Air Florida sold the stake at a $10mm loss in 1982.

=== Flight 90 and aftermath ===
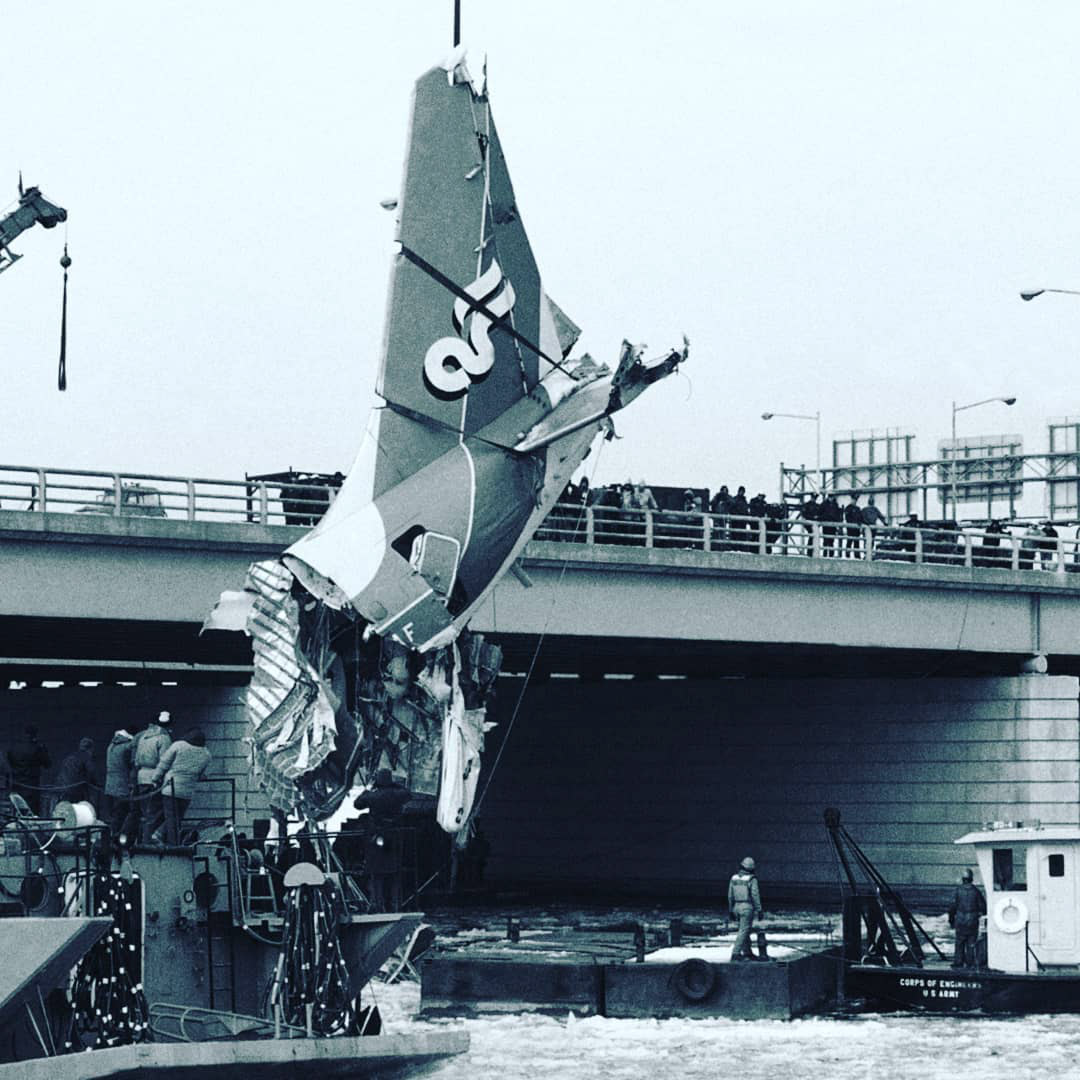
The tail section of Flight 90 being hoisted from the Potomac River

On January 13, 1982, Air Florida suffered a fatal crash in Washington DC, with a Boeing 737 aircraft hitting a bridge and ending in the Potomac River. Video of rescue efforts were widely broadcast, as was an iconic image of the broken tail of the Air Florida aircraft being pulled from the river. Air Florida reservations dried up. Later in the year the National Transportation Safety Board investigation blamed the crash on the Air Florida pilots.

Air Florida's fortunes turned for the worse even before the crash. A substantial financial loss in the fourth quarter of 1981 was driven by fierce fare wars, including by Pan Am now run by Ed Acker. Heavy losses continued into 1982, but even after the crash, Air Florida management continued to consider mergers, this time with Braniff, in distress as it headed towards a May 1982 bankruptcy and grounding. The economy was in trouble and airlines particularly so. In July, Timoner suffered a debilitating stroke, with Donald Lloyd-Jones becoming CEO. Lloyd-Jones was an American Airlines veteran who lost the heir-apparent competition at American to Bob Crandall and had joined Air Florida as president.

Air Florida^{(1)} Financial Results, 1979 thru YE3Q83^{(2)}
(USD mm)	1979	1980	1981	1982	YE3Q83
Op revenue	60,047	161,262	302,962	281,770	214,433
Op profit (loss)	3,965	9,495	(12,070)	(33,480)	(16,309)
Net profit (loss)	3,383	5,631	(4,122)	(78,507)	(50,941)
Op margin	6.6%	5.9%	-4.0%	-11.9%	-7.6%
Net margin	5.6%	3.5%	-1.4%	-27.9%	-23.8%
(1) Solely the airline, as filed with the CAB. (2) Air Florida did not file with CAB 4Q83 and after.

=== Two years of struggle ===
Central to Lloyd-Jones's recovery strategy was shrinking Air Florida. From June 1982 to May 1984 the fleet dropped from 29 to 11.

- Air Florida shrank but did not simplify. It continued to fly to Europe, despite financials that showed Europe to be the worst of the three Air Florida geographies: US, Europe and Latin America (Latin American operations were consistently close-to-break-even or better). Indeed, even after it collapsed, the first operation Air Florida sought to resuscitate was its London route, yet it was the domestic 737 operation that survived the bankruptcy.
- It continued to fly Northeast to Florida routes in the face of brutal competition from Eastern and Pan Am – Eastern because New York to Miami was its marquee route since before WWII, a source of profits for decades. Pan Am for its part had bought National Airlines in 1979, which for decades shared that New York to Miami route with Eastern. Therefore, that market was also important to Pan Am. But as much as Eastern and Pan Am lost on such routes, it did not have the proportionate impact on them as it did on Air Florida. As Eastern CEO Frank Borman noted in 1982, "we bled seriously, but only from a vein, [Air Florida] bled from an artery".

High 1982 losses led Air Florida's outside accountants to qualify that year's financials with a going concern warning; they had reason to doubt Air Florida's survival. Interest expense ballooned to $35mm in 1982 from $10mm in 1980, a serious problem for a shrinking company that had never generated an operating profit of more than $10mm. From 4Q83, the company did not meet its obligation of filing CAB reports and when it collapsed Air Florida had $27mm in accounts receivable – amounts uncollected from travel agencies, credit card processors, other airlines and so forth. This was a source of post-bankruptcy funding. Air Florida main lender declared a default on loans in July 1983, almost a year before the carrier Florida ceased operation. Headlines remained negative, as Air Florida tried increasingly creative ways to remain funded. Towards the end, the company funded itself in part by not making required payments to the employee credit union, payroll taxes and medical insurance.

=== Chapter 11, Midway Express and sale ===
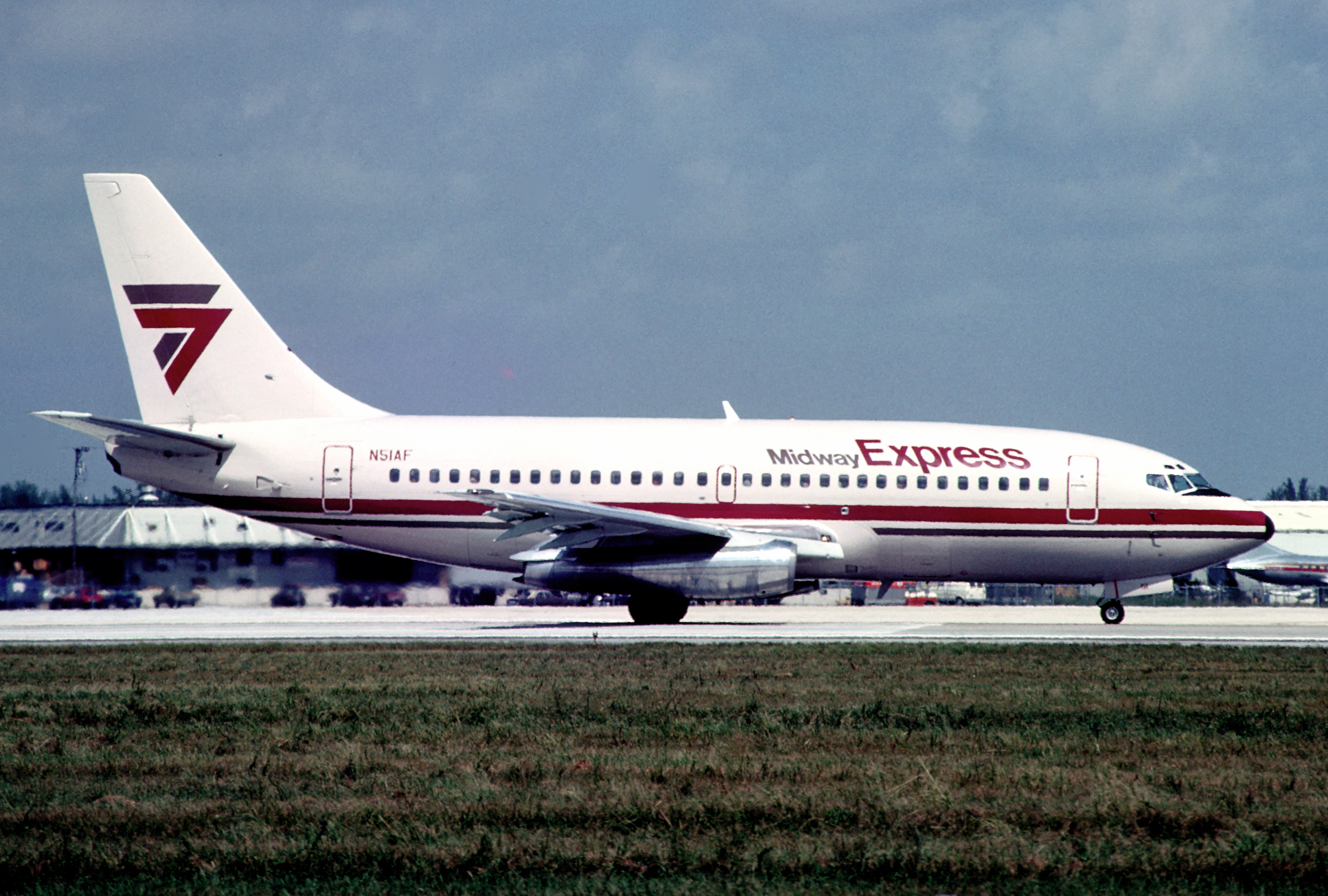
737-200 at Miami, October 1984

In May 1984, Lloyd-Jones resigned abruptly after losing the confidence of the board. He was replaced by board chair, J.R.K. Tinkle. On July 3, the airline ceased operations and filed for Chapter 11 bankruptcy. The airline said it would fly again, but made little progress. Then, a week before a court deadline of late August, Tinkle approached Midway and a deal came together quickly, despite Midway's then tight-focus on business travelers (including 100% first-class seating), a different target market from Air Florida's clientele. Midway wasn't in the best shape either. It made a substantial loss in 1983 and would make an even bigger loss in 1984. Tinkle said he picked Midway for its "experienced personnel", "$40mm in cash" and "a route system that has been very well run". It certainly had the cash to get Air Florida operating again. Attractions for Midway included Air Florida's slots at New York LaGuardia and Washington National airports, and winter demand to offset the winter lull in Midway's primarily east–west system.

Air Florida would fly 737s under contract to Midway under the brand-name "Midway Express" until the CAB gave permanent approval (it initially provided temporary approval) for a Midway acquisition, with Midway selling the seats. The deal was nominally $53mm, $35mm of which paid the FAA for three 737s (the FAA administered a federal aircraft loan guarantee program that had financed the aircraft). Many parties objected to the bankruptcy court, but Midway had the only offer so the judge approved it, putting 300 Air Florida employees back to work. In the end, Midway didn't need to pay for the aircraft, instead a lessor bought them and leased them back to Midway. Midway supervised Air Florida under the eye of the court and provided it with working capital. On October 15, 1984, Air Florida dba Midway Express was back in the sky. Eastern sued to stop the deal. It had a prior deal with the Air Florida bankruptcy estate for the airport slots, but the FAA rejected it saying the slots weren't airline property. Eastern said Midway Express was just a workaround to allow Midway to buy the slots, but the court noted the fact that Air Florida was back in operation was a pretty big difference.

In July 1985, Midway committed the cash and preferred stock it promised for the deal and on August 14, 1985, the bankruptcy court gave final approval to the sale of Air Florida to Midway, which Midway initially constituted as a subsidiary called "Midway Airlines (1984)", painting the aircraft in Midway livery. In its 1985 annual report, Midway disclosed that Midway Express made a profit of $1.4mm in the period prior to acquisition.

== Legacy ==
Air Florida was viewed as a cautionary story in how deregulation could go wrong. It was the "little airline that could" and a "skyrocket" of an airline that outgrew its management, had a terrible accident and was punished for it. Thomas Petzinger in the classic book Hard Landing about the airline industry of the era, leaves a similar impression, telescoping the period from Flight 90 to collapse in just a paragraph, making it sound like collapse occurred only months later.

Air Florida, in the form of Midway Express, had a material impact on Midway. After poor 1983 and 1984 results, Midway's management changed in 1985 and new management restructured the airline. The new Midway was more like Midway Express than the all-business class airline it had been in 1984. In fact, the airline would eventually become all economy class, like Midway Express. Midway added more leisure destinations (like Phoenix and Las Vegas) to accompany Florida and by 1987 the 737 fleet increased to 12. The old Air Florida maintenance base in Miami became Midway's maintenance base. This version of Midway did better than the old. Midway broke even on an operating basis in 1985 and made a solid profit in 1986, 1987 and 1988.

== Air Florida Commuter ==
Air Florida Commuter was not an airline, but a system of affiliated commuter and regional air carriers that fed traffic into Air Florida's hubs. In an arrangement commonly known as code-sharing, each airline painted their aircraft in Air Florida colors and their flights were listed in reservations systems as Air Florida flights. Air Miami became the first affiliate in 1980 and over a dozen other airlines became part of the system, including: Air Sunshine, Marco Island Airways, Florida Airlines, Key Air, Southern International, Skyway Airlines, North American Airlines, National Commuter Airlines, Gull Air, Pompano, Finair, Slocum, Atlantic Gulf, Skyway of Ocala and others. As Air Florida became financially strapped, the commuter system was dismantled in early 1984.

== Destinations ==
City	Feb 1979	Dec 1981	Sep 1982	Jan 1984
Bermuda		X		
Boston		X	X	X
Brussels		X	X	
Burlington			X	X
Chicago O'Hare		X		
Chicago Midway				X
Cincinnati				X
Cleveland				X
Columbus				X
Daytona Beach	X			
Detroit				X
Fort Lauderdale	X	X	X	X
Fort Myers			X	X
Freeport		X	X	X
Gainesville	X		X	X
George Town			X	X
Grand Turk			X	X
Guatemala City			X	X
Hyannis				X
Indianapolis				X
Jacksonville	X	X	X	X
Key West	X		X	X
Kingston		X	X	X
London Gatwick		X	X	X
Marathon	X			
Marco Island			X	
Marsh Harbour	X	X	X	X
Miami	X	X	X	X
Montego Bay		X	X	X
Nantucket				X
Newark		X		
New Orleans				X
New York JFK		X		
New York LaGuardia		X	X	X
North Eleuthera	X	X	X	X
Ocala		X	X	X
Orlando	X	X	X	X
Oslo			X	
Panama City, FL	X			
Pensacola	X	X	X	X
Philadelphia	X			X
Port-au-Prince		X	X	X
Puerto Plata		X	X	X
Rock Sound	X	X	X	X
Saint Croix	X			X
Saint Thomas				X
San Jose (C.R.)		X	X	X
San Pedro Sula		X	X	X
San Salvador		X	X	X
Santo Domingo			X	X
Sarasota			X	X
Shannon		X	X	
Stockholm			X	
Stuart				X
Tallahassee	X	X		X
Tampa	X	X	X	X
Tegucigalpa		X	X	X
Toledo		X	X	
Treasure Cay	X	X	X	X
Washington National	X	X	X	X
West Palm Beach	X	X	X	X
White Plains		X	X	X

Some of the above destinations in the U.S. and the Bahamas were served by commuter air carriers operating Air Florida Commuter service with prop and turboprop aircraft via respective code sharing agreements.

Air Florida also served Belize City, Belize; Charleston, South Carolina; Chicago (Midway Airport), Illinois; Dallas/Ft. Worth (DFW Airport), Texas; Düsseldorf, Germany; Frankfurt, Germany; Houston (Hobby Airport), Texas; Paris, France; Madrid, Spain; Providence, Rhode Island; Providenciales, Turk and Caicos Islands; St. Petersburg, Florida; San Juan, Puerto Rico; Savannah, Georgia; and Zürich, Switzerland with mainline jet service at various times during its existence. In addition, Air Florida Commuter served Lakeland, Florida in early 1983.

== Fleet ==
When Air Florida ceased operations in July 1984, it was operating the following aircraft:

Aircraft	Total	Orders	Notes
Boeing 737-100	2	—	
Boeing 737-200	8	—	1 Destroyed as Air Florida Flight 90
Boeing 757-200	—	3	
Douglas DC-8-62	1	—	Leased from Rich International Airways
McDonnell Douglas DC-10-30CF	1	—	
Total	12	3	

=== Retired fleet ===
Air Florida operated the following aircraft prior to its demise:

- BAC One-Eleven (operated by British Island Airways in Europe to provide passenger feed for Air Florida's transatlantic flights. The aircraft had Air Florida titles in addition to their British Island Airways titles)
- Boeing 707-320
- Boeing 727-100
- Boeing 727-200
- Boeing 737-100
- Boeing 737-200
- McDonnell Douglas DC-9-15RC
- Lockheed L-188C Electra

== Accidents and incidents ==
- On August 10, 1980, Air Florida Flight 4, with 35 people on board, operated by a Boeing 737 from Miami International Airport to Key West International Airport, was taken over by a hijacker, who demanded to be flown to Cuba. He later surrendered in Havana.
- Three days later, on August 13, 1980, Air Florida Flight 707, another Boeing 737, flying the opposite direction of Flight 4, with 74 people on board, was hijacked by seven people. They demanded to be taken to Cuba, but later surrendered.
- On September 22, 1981, Air Florida Flight 2198, operated by a McDonnell-Douglas DC-10 carrying 71 occupants, suffered an uncontained engine failure. The aircraft aborted takeoff.
- On January 13, 1982, Air Florida Flight 90 crashed very shortly after takeoff from Washington National Airport due to atmospheric icing and pilot error, killing 74 of the 79 people on board, injuring four of the five survivors, and killing four people on the Interstate 395 14th Street Bridge, which the Boeing 737-200 crashed into before plunging into the ice covered Potomac River.
- On February 2, 1982, Air Florida Flight 710, a Boeing 737-200 with 77 people on board from Miami International to Key West International was hijacked. The hijacker wanted to be taken to Cuba, but he later surrendered.
- On July 7, 1983, Air Florida Flight 8 with 47 people on board was flying from Fort Lauderdale International Airport to Tampa International Airport. One of the passengers handed a note to one of the flight attendants, saying that he had a bomb, and telling them to fly the plane to Havana, Cuba. He revealed a small athletic bag, which he opened, and inside was an apparent explosive device. The airplane was diverted to Havana-José Martí International Airport, and the hijacker was taken into custody by Cuban authorities.

== See also ==
- List of defunct airlines of the United States
