= Pseudo.com =

Streaming content service

- Type: Private
- Founded: New York City 1993
- Headquarters: New York, New York, US
- Key people: Josh Harris, Founder
- Website: www.pseudo.com

Pseudo.com was an early streaming content service. It was founded by Josh Harris, who broadcast an AM radio show solely dedicated to the Internet, after which tapes of the show would be carried 12 blocks from the WEVD Radio headquarters to 600 Broadway and uploaded to the internet. It soon evolved into a multi-show network and then further to different streaming channels; Pseudo webcast live audio and video webcasting as well as previously recorded material. Founded in New York in late 1993, Pseudo began to grow in the late 1990s after an influx of capital and the advent of dial up internet taking hold with the general population, growing to a company with multiple streaming channels.

Its parent company Pseudo Programs Inc. filed for bankruptcy following the dot-com bubble. Its assets were purchased by INTV in 2001. Harris claimed in 2008 that Pseudo had been a "fake company" and "the linchpin of a long form piece of conceptual art."

== Channels and shows ==
- 88HipHop.com
- allgames.com
- channelP.com
- Space Watch
- KoolOut.com
- Barefeet Sock Puppet Theater
- Cherrybomb
- Queendom
- Beatminerz Radio
- 88Soul
- streetsound
- FreQ
- Thunk!

== Key people ==
- Josh Harris - Founder/Chairman/Luvvy
- Jacques Tégé, Jr. - Founder/Animator/Developer
- V. Owen Bush - Founder/Producer
- Dennis Adamo - Founder/Producer
- Jeff Gompertz - Founder/Producer
- Volcano - Founder/Producer
- Mike Rinzel - Founder/Producer
- Cal "Judgecal" Chamberlain - Founder/Producer/Webmaster/Sys-admin
- Robert Galinsky - Founder/Ex. Prod. Pseudo Network/Ex. Prod. Pseudo Radio/Founder ChannelP
- Thomas "TBo" Linder - Founder/Producer/Sound Designer
- Janice Erlbaum - Founder/Producer
- Lou Velez - Programmer/Producer
- Feedbuck - Projection Designer
- Bonnie Weinstein - Chatmaster
- Jill Abrahams - Cherrybomb, Creator/Executive Producer
- Missy Galore - Projection Designer
- Dan Melamid - Producer
- Rose Costanza - Producer & REAL Netcaster
- Randy Nkonoki-Ward - Producer
- Joey John - Producer
- Uziele Fischer - Producer, Party Thrower
- Joey Fortuna - Founder/Programmer/Producer/Inventor
- Jess Zaino - Producer
- Chris Torella - Producer
- Scot Rubin - SVP Games and Sports
- David Grandison - Producer
- Ron Marans - Producer
- Christian Skovly - Director of Internet Technology
- Joli Moniz - Producer
- David Bohrman - VP & Washington Bureau Chief at CNN America
- Mark Berniker - Executive Producer and co-anchor, BizTech TV
- Brendan Hasenstab - Senior Producer and co-anchor, BizTech TV
- Eric Capstick - Technical Director, BizTech TV
- John O'Leary - Producer, BizTech TV
