= Silicon Alley =

Area of high tech companies in New York City

Coordinates: 40.7421°N 73.9911°W

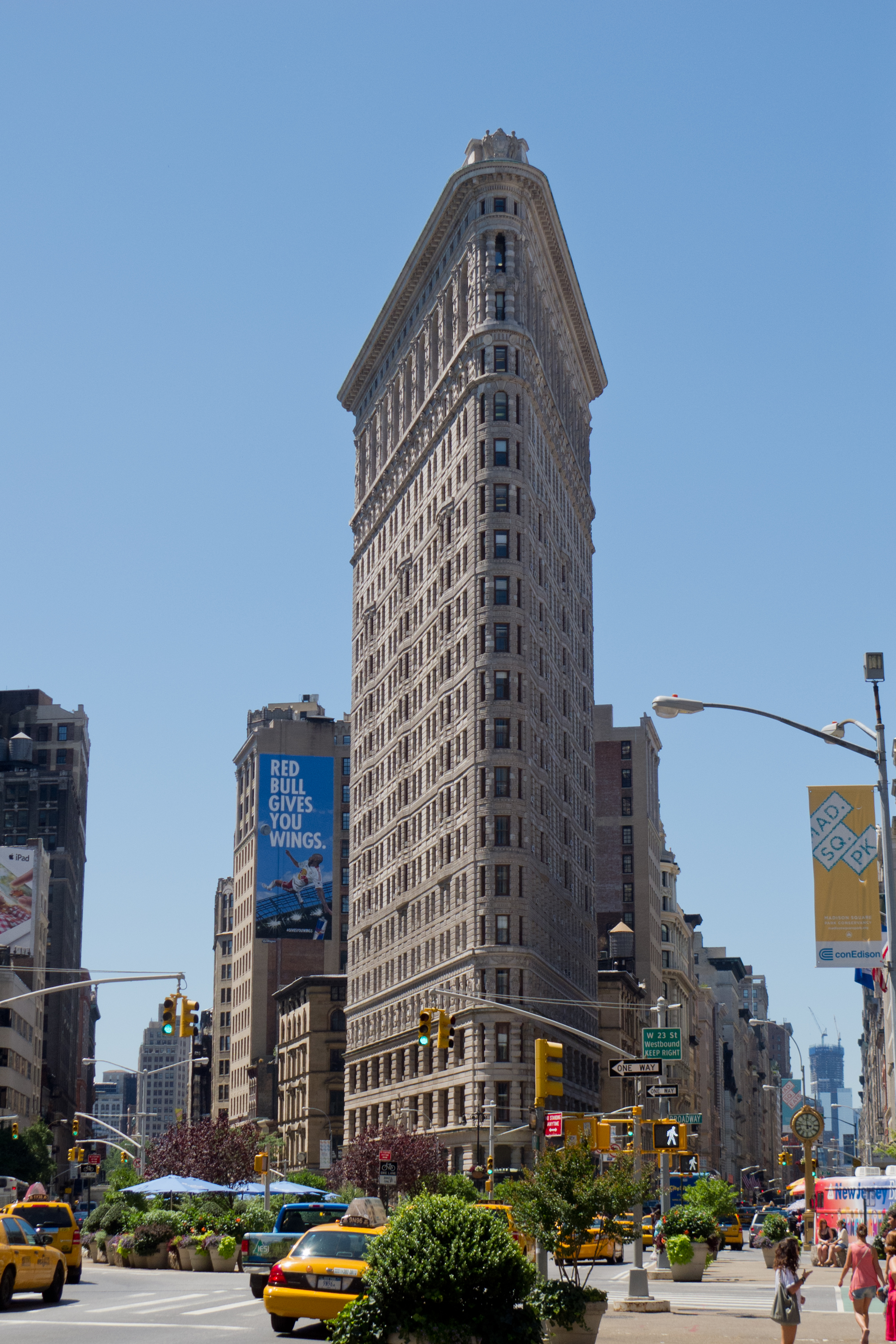
The Flatiron District was the cradle of Silicon Alley, now metonymous for the New York metropolitan region's high tech sector, which has since expanded beyond the area.

Silicon Alley was an area of high tech companies centered around southern Manhattan's Flatiron district in New York City. The term was coined in the 1990s during the dot-com boom, alluding to California's Silicon Valley tech center. The name was used to refer not only to the area in which many internet startups were headquartered, but also the startup movement in New York City as a whole. The metonym has lost usage since 2003 as New York tech companies became more widespread, their headquarters spread outside of the Flatiron area, and New York as a whole became a top-tier global high technology hub.. New York City's current tech sphere encompasses an array of companies developing artificial intelligence, the internet, new media, financial technology (fintech) and cryptocurrency, biotechnology, game design, and other fields within information technology that are supported by its entrepreneurship ecosystem and venture capital investments.

== Antecedents (1984–1994) ==
New York had a base of online and interactive-media activity before the term "Silicon Alley" came into use. Early Silicon Alley companies drew heavily on them for founders and employees.

Prodigy. The consumer online service Prodigy began in 1984 as Trintex, a videotex joint venture of IBM, CBS and Sears. CBS withdrew in 1986, leaving IBM and Sears as partners. Headquartered in White Plains, New York, Prodigy opened to the public in 1988 and launched nationally in 1990. By early 1995 it had about 1.25 million subscribers, making it the second-largest online service after CompuServe. In 1995 the company was planning to move its headquarters from White Plains to Manhattan. Scott Kurnit, who later founded About.com, joined Prodigy from Showtime Networks in 1994. IBM and Sears sold Prodigy in May 1996 to International Wireless and a group of Prodigy executives.

Echo and NYU's ITP. Echo ("East Coast Hang Out"), a dial-up online community started at the end of the 1980s by Stacy Horn from her West Village apartment, became a hub for the city's early internet scene. About 40 percent of its users were women, at a time when women made up roughly a tenth of people online, and its membership produced businesses and projects including the webzine Urban Desires and the interactive agency Agency.com. Horn was a recent graduate of New York University's Interactive Telecommunications Program (ITP), whose longtime leader, Red Burns, became known as the "godmother of Silicon Alley". ITP granted some 3,000 degrees during her tenure; its alumni include Dennis Crowley, co-founder of Foursquare.

CD-ROM publishing and research firms. In the early 1990s the city was a center of CD-ROM publishing. The Voyager Company, based in SoHo, had about $12 million in revenue and more than 100 employees by 1994, and publishers including Random House, Simon & Schuster, Time Warner and HarperCollins set up interactive divisions; many of these ventures contracted or closed later in the decade. Josh Harris founded the internet research firm Jupiter Communications in 1986.

New York New Media Association. The New York New Media Association (NYNMA), a nonprofit trade group, was founded in 1994 by venture capitalist Brian Horey. By mid-1995 it had about 1,200 members and held a monthly gathering, "Cybersuds", at bars in SoHo and Greenwich Village; it later grew to about 7,000 individual members representing some 2,500 companies. Informal "CyberSlacker" parties in the early and mid-1990s drew people who went on to found Feed, Razorfish, Pseudo.com, Nerve and the Silicon Alley Reporter.

== Origin ==
The term Silicon Alley was derived from the long-established Silicon Valley in California. It was originally centered in the Flatiron District, in the vicinity of the Flatiron Building at Fifth Avenue near Broadway and 23rd Street, straddling Midtown and Lower Manhattan. Silicon Alley initially also used to extend to Dumbo, a neighborhood in Brooklyn. Columbia University and NYU's leaderships were especially important in the alley's early development.

The term Silicon Alley may have been coined in 1995 by a New York staffing recruiter, Jason Denmark, who was supporting technical clients in downtown Manhattan. In an effort to attract candidates who, at that time, were focusing on positions in Silicon Valley, he posted job ads with the Silicon Alley label on the Object Technology Developers usenet forum. The subject "NYC - silicon ALLEY" shows up in an internet post by Jason Denmark on February 16, 1995; another Jason Denmark post on June 16, 1995 has the subject "SILICON 'ALLEY' POSITIONS."

The first publication to cover Silicon Alley was @NY, an online newsletter founded in the summer of 1995 by Tom Watson and Jason Chervokas. The first magazine to focus on venture capital opportunities in Silicon Alley, AlleyCat News co-founded by Anna Copeland Wheatley and Janet Stites, was launched in the fall of 1996. Courtney Pulitzer branched off from her @The Scene column with @NY and created Courtney Pulitzer's Cyber Scene and her popular networking events Cocktails with Courtney. First Tuesday, co-founded by Vincent Grimaldi de Puget and John Grossbart, became the largest gathering of Silicon Alley, welcoming 500 to 1000 venture capitalists and entrepreneurs every month. It was an initiative of law firm Sonnenschein and the Kellogg School of Management, as well as other corporate founders, including Accenture (then Andersen Consulting), AlleyCat News and Merrill Lynch. Silicon Alley Reporter started publishing in October 1996. It was founded by Jason Calacanis and was in business from 1996 to 2001. @NY, print magazines, and the attending media coverage by the larger New York press helped to popularize both the name, and the idea of New York City as a dot-com center.

== Companies of the boom (1995–2000) ==
Interactive agencies. Razorfish was founded in 1995 by Jeff Dachis and Craig Kanarick in Dachis's East Village apartment. It went public in April 1999, raising $48 million at $16 a share, and was at one point valued at more than $4 billion. Agency.com, founded in 1995, had grown to more than 1,000 employees by its initial public offering in late 1999.

Content and media. iVillage, a network of sites for women, was founded in 1995 by Candice Carpenter, Nancy Evans and Robert Levitan. Its March 1999 public offering was priced at $24 a share; the stock opened at nearly $96. TheStreet.com, a financial news site, was founded in 1996 by James Cramer and Martin Peretz. About.com was incorporated in New York in June 1996 as General Internet Inc. under Scott Kurnit, and went public in March 1999 as MiningCo.com at $25 a share. Pseudo Programs, an early internet television network, was founded in 1993 by Josh Harris.

Advertising technology. DoubleClick, an internet ad-serving company, was founded in 1996 by Kevin O'Connor and Dwight Merriman. It grew from 13 employees in March 1996 to more than 1,300 by the end of 1999, and went public in February 1998.

IPO boom. TheGlobe.com, an early social networking site founded in 1995 by two college friends, went public on November 13, 1998. Priced at $9, its shares closed the first day at $63.50, a 606 percent gain and at the time the best first-day performance of any IPO raising more than $10 million. EarthWeb's shares more than tripled on their first day of trading in fall 1998. StarMedia Network, a Spanish- and Portuguese-language portal founded in 1996 by Fernando Espuelas and Jack Chen, moved from Connecticut to Manhattan and raised $80 million from investors.

Delivery services. Kozmo.com, founded in 1997 by Joseph Park and Yong Kang, offered one-hour delivery of goods ordered online. It grew to about 3,000 employees in 11 cities and received a $60 million investment from Amazon.com.

== Investors ==
In 1995, U.S. venture capital firms were concentrated in Silicon Valley and Boston with very few in New York City. Silicon Alley companies were financed by a mix of out-of-town venture firms, corporate sponsors, angel investors, and new venture capital firms. They invested about $185 million in the city's technology companies in 1997 and $287 million in 1998; in 1999, venture investment in New York-area internet companies reached about $1.6 billion.

=== Venture capital firms ===
RRE Ventures was founded in 1994 by Stuart Ellman and James D. Robinson IV, with Robinson's father, former American Express chief executive James D. Robinson III. Flatiron Partners, named for the district, was founded in 1996 by Fred Wilson and Jerry Colonna. By 2001, Flatiron had invested about $550 million in 57 companies, including the local firms TheStreet.com, StarMedia, Kozmo.com and Multex.com, as well as GeoCities. Silicon Valley firms also invested in the district; Kleiner Perkins, for example, was an early backer of iVillage.

=== Corporate investors ===
New York's concentration of media, financial and advertising companies made corporate investors an unusually large source of capital for Silicon Alley.

- Banks and financial firms. Chase Capital Partners, the private-equity arm of Chase Manhattan, was one of Flatiron Partners' two original backers. Flatiron was first based in Chase Capital's midtown offices, and by 2001 its investments required the approval of J.P. Morgan Partners, Chase Capital's successor. Chase Capital Partners also invested directly in StarMedia.
- Technology companies. SoftBank was Flatiron Partners' other original backer. America Online made its first major investment in an independent company when it invested in iVillage in September 1995. Amazon.com invested $60 million in Kozmo.com.
- Media and cable companies. TCI Interactive and the Tribune Company invested in iVillage by 1996, and NBC took an equity stake in 1998 in exchange for services. The New York Times Company agreed in February 1999 to invest $15 million in TheStreet.com. Comcast Interactive Investments bought $2.5 million of stock in About.com (then MiningCo.com) alongside its 1999 public offering.
- Advertising holding companies. Omnicom Group invested in Razorfish in 1996. By 2001, through its Communicade unit, Omnicom held about 40 percent of Agency.com and a significant minority stake in Razorfish.

Established companies also built internet operations of their own in the city, including Hearst's New Media & Technology division, Barnes & Noble's web unit, which had 700 employees when it was spun off in March 1999, and Donaldson, Lufkin & Jenrette's DLJdirect.

== MOUSE ==
In 1997, over 200 members and leaders of Silicon Alley joined NYC entrepreneurs, Andrew Rasiej and Cecilia Pagkalinawan to help wire Washington Irving High School to the Internet. This response and the Department of Education's growing need for technology integration marked the birth of Making Opportunities for Upgrading Schools and Education (MOUSE), an organization that today serves tens of thousands of underserved youth in schools in five states and over 20 countries.

== Dot-com bust ==
The rapid growth of internet companies during the 1990s, known as the dot-com bubble, came to a rapid halt during the early 2000s recession. During this economic contraction, many internet companies in Silicon Alley folded. Pseudo Programs shut down in September 2000 and laid off all 175 of its employees. Razorfish's stock, which had risen above $80 within seven months of its 1999 IPO, fell below $5 in October 2000. iVillage's shares fell to 38 cents by March 2001. In April 2001 Kozmo.com, having failed to find a buyer, ceased operations in all nine of its markets and laid off its remaining staff of about 1,100. In May 2001 Flatiron Partners moved out of its Park Avenue South offices into those of its backer, J.P. Morgan Chase.

The economic slowdown that followed the September 11 attacks deepened the downturn. According to the New York State Department of Labor, information-technology employment in the city fell from about 50,000 jobs in 2000 to about 35,000 by late 2005.

Several of the era's larger companies survived and were later acquired:

- DoubleClick was taken private in 2005 by Hellman & Friedman and JMI Equity for about $1.1 billion, then bought by Google for $3.1 billion in a deal announced in April 2007 and completed in March 2008.
- About.com was acquired by Primedia in late 2000 in a stock deal then valued at about $690 million, and was sold to The New York Times Company in 2005 for $410 million.
- iVillage was acquired by NBC Universal in 2006 for about $600 million.

The recession also affected publications that covered the sector. After the dot-com bust, the Silicon Alley Reporter was rebranded as Venture Reporter, in September 2001, and sold to Dow Jones. Self-financed AlleyCat News ceased publication in October 2001.

== Recovery ==
A couple of years after the dot-com bust, Silicon Alley began making its comeback with the help of NY Tech Meetup, and NextNY.

Union Square Ventures was founded in 2003 by Fred Wilson and Brad Burnham. The New York Tech Meetup grew from four attendees at its first meeting in 2004 to more than 4,500 members by 2007.

Alumni of the first wave founded many of the second-wave companies. Former DoubleClick executives Kevin Ryan and Dwight Merriman co-founded the flash-sale retailer Gilt Groupe, the database company 10gen (later MongoDB) and Business Insider, and Ryan's AlleyCorp seeded a group of further New York startups. Business Insider began as the blog Silicon Alley Insider, launched on May 16, 2007, with Henry Blodget as a co-founder. Axel Springer SE acquired 88 percent of the company in 2015 in a deal that valued it at $442 million. MongoDB's October 2017 IPO was described as a "much-needed win" for New York technology.

Seth Goldstein, who founded online advertising firm SiteSpecific in 1995 and sold it to CKS Group in 1997, before joining Flatiron Partners as an entrepreneur-in-residence, later founded Majestic Research, which sold internet-derived data to Wall Street firms and was sold for $75 million, and in 2005 co-founded Root Markets, an exchange for online consumer leads. In 2011 he and Billy Chasen co-founded the social music service Turntable.fm, which raised a financing round led by Union Square Ventures later that year.

Tumblr, founded in New York in February 2007 by David Karp, was acquired by Yahoo! in May 2013 for $1.1 billion in cash and remained headquartered in the city. In December 2010 Google bought 111 Eighth Avenue, a full-block building in which it already leased about 500,000 square feet, for close to $1.9 billion.

On December 19, 2011, then Mayor Michael R. Bloomberg announced his choice of Cornell University and Technion-Israel Institute of Technology to build a US$2 billion graduate school of applied sciences on Roosevelt Island, with the goal of transforming New York City into the world's premier technology capital. As of 2013, Google's second largest office by number of employees, 111 Eighth Avenue, is located in New York. Verizon Communications, headquartered at 140 West Street in Lower Manhattan, was in 2014 in the final stages of completing a US$3 billion fiber-optic telecommunications upgrade throughout New York City.

== In literature and film ==
Silicon Alley's boom and bust have been the subject of memoirs, oral histories, academic studies, documentaries and fiction:

- Burn Rate: How I Survived the Gold Rush Years on the Internet (1998), journalist Michael Wolff's memoir of running his internet company, Wolff New Media.
- Startup.com (2001), a documentary by Jehane Noujaim and Chris Hegedus about the New York startup govWorks.com.
- e-Dreams (2001), a documentary that follows Kozmo.com's founders.
- Digital Hustlers: Living Large and Falling Hard in Silicon Alley (2001), an oral history by Casey Kait and Stephen Weiss.
- No-Collar: The Humane Workplace and Its Hidden Costs (2003), sociologist Andrew Ross's study of Razorfish and 360hiphop.com.
- We Live in Public (2009), Ondi Timoner's documentary about Josh Harris and Pseudo, which won the Grand Jury Prize for documentary at the 2009 Sundance Film Festival.
- Venture Labor: Work and the Burden of Risk in Innovative Industries (2012), sociologist Gina Neff's study of Silicon Alley workers during the 1990s boom.
- Bleeding Edge (2013), a novel by Thomas Pynchon set in Manhattan's tech scene in 2001, after the dot-com bust and in the months around the September 11 attacks.

== See also ==
- BioValley
- Silicon Beach – Westside, Los Angeles
- Silicon Docks – Dublin, Ireland
- Silicon Fen – Cambridge, United Kingdom
- Silicon Forest – Portland, Oregon
- Silicon Hills – Austin, Texas
- Silicon Prairie – Several Midwestern cities
- Silicon Slopes – Lehi, Utah
- Silicon Valley – San Jose, California
- Silicon Wadi – coastal Israel
- Tech Valley – Hudson Valley, New York
