= BioValley (Malaysia) =

BioValley is a cluster proposed by the government to attract the biotechnological industry to Malaysia It was planned as a launch pad for Malaysia, biotechnological industry, as the Multimedia Super Corridor and Cyberjaya was intended for the IT industry. It was also considered an important component for the Vision 2020 plan and Malaysia's future as a knowledge economy. It was originally intended to be situated in Dengkil three research institutions are planned for the first phase, the National Institute for Genomics and Molecular Biology, the National Institute for Pharmaceutical and Neutraceutical Biotechnology and National Institute for Agro-Biotechnology . Its location would put it within the Multimedia Super Corridor and in close proximity and to the south of the IT hub of Cyberjaya and the administrative capital of Putrajaya. It would also therefore be within reasonable proximity to the capital of Kuala Lumpur.

It was first proposed under the Eighth Malaysia Plan, however its development was largely kept under wraps . This was widely report to be because the government wished to avoid a repeat of the perceived failure to meet the lofty goals announced as part of the Multimedia Super Corridor. The project was launched with limited fanfare on 20 May 2003 by the then Prime Minister of Malaysia Mahathir Mohamad. Compared to the launch of the Multimedia Super Corridor reporting of the launch and plans in the government backed media was notably less extensive.

Its current status is uncertain. Earlier reporting indicated it would be ready by 2006 and complete by 2009 but there has been a notable lack of information about its progress. In 2005, it was reported by the journal Nature as a failed project . According to other sources, the latest roadmap is that BioValley will be developed from the existing centres of excellence rather than centred in Dengkil. The National Institute for Pharmaceutical and Neutraceutical Biotechnology will still be in located in Dengkil albeit with strong links to the Universiti Sains Malaysia.

Under the Ninth Malaysia Plan RM2 billion was allocated for biotechnology (physical and soft infrastructures). A further RM2.3 billion was allocated for setting up a National Institute of Cancer, a National Forensic Institute and a National Institute for Oral Health although the location of these institutes is uncertain. RM4.4 billion was allocated for modernising agriculture farming and RM2.6 billion for support services related to agriculture.

== See also ==
- BioValley
- Silicon Alley
- Silicon Hills
- Silicon Valley
- Tech Valley
