= BioValley (Europe) =

BioValley is the leading life science cluster in Europe, founded 1996. It connects academia and companies of three nations in the Upper Rhine Valley, namely France, Germany and Switzerland. The main objective is the greater research cooperation between companies and academia involved in the life science sectors, including pharmacology, biotechnology, nanotechnology, medical technology, chemistry and agricultural biotechnology.

== See also ==
- BioValley
- Silicon Alley
- Silicon Hills
- Silicon Valley
- Tech Valley

== Press releases ==
- www.naturejobs.com
