= John Chervokas =

American advertising writer and executive

John V. Chervokas
- Born: 1936; Norwood, Massachusetts, United States
- Died: July 23, 2011 (aged 74–75); Ossining, New York, United States
- Education: Fordham University (B.A., 1959)
- Occupations: Advertising writer and executive
- Employers: Benton & Bowles; William Esty Co.; Grey Advertising; McCann Erickson; Warwick Advertising (Vice Chairman & CCO); Sudler & Hennessey (Vice Chairman & CCO)
- Known for: Creator of Charmin's Mr. Whipple campaign and the tagline "Please don't squeeze the Charmin"
- Office: Ossining Town Supervisor (1998-2028)
- Spouse: Roseanna Chervokas
- Children: 3

John V. Chervokas (1936 – July 23, 2011) was an American advertising writer and executive. Chervokas created the Charmin's Mr. Whipple ad campaign, and wrote and coined the tagline, "Please don't squeeze the Charmin", which is used by the character in the television commercial.

== Biography ==
Chervokas was born in 1936 in Norwood, Massachusetts. He received his bachelor's degree in 1959 from Fordham University. Chervokas went to work in the advertising industry following his graduation from college. In 1964, while working for Benton & Bowles, Chevokas wrote the Mr. Whipple commercial and created the character's iconic plea to grocery shoppers, "Please don't squeeze the Charmin." The commercial proved a massive hit with consumers.

Chervokas did not publicly take credit for his work until he published a first-person piece entitled "Confession of a Creative Chief: "I Squeezed The Charmin" in Advertising Age on December 25, 1972. The commercial was later named the 51st best television spot of the 20th century by Advertising Age.

Chervokas went on to work in some of the industry's most prominent ad agencies. He served as the vice chairman and chief creative officer of Warwick Advertising. Chervokas also worked at William Esty Co., Grey Advertising (now known as Grey Global Group) and McCann Erickson. He finally moved to Sudler & Hennessey, where he worked as the agency's chief creative officer and vice chairman until his retirement from advertising in 1994.

Chervokas served as the president of the school board of the Ossining, New York, school district during the 1970s. Following his retirement from advertising, he became the president of the Greater Ossining Chamber of Commerce during the middle of the 1990s. He was elected as an Ossining town supervisor from 1998 until 2008, when he voluntarily stepped down from the position due to declining health.

Chervokas died of complications of Parkinson's disease on July 23, 2011, at the age of 74. He was survived by his wife, Roseanna; daughter, Jessica; two sons, Josh and Jason; and three grandchildren.
