= We're Gonna Win Twins =

Fight song for the Minnesota Twins

Song by Kathy Mueller, Scott Nelson, Steve McLoone, and Mary Jane Alm
- Released: 1961
- Genre: Fight song
- Songwriters: Dick Wilson and Ray Charles

"We're Gonna Win Twins" is the fight song for the Minnesota Twins, played when the team takes the field before any home game. It has been used since the team moved to Minnesota in 1961. The song was written by Dick Wilson (not to be confused with Dick Wilson) and Ray Charles (not to be confused with Ray Charles) and performed by Kathy Mueller, Scott Nelson, Steve McLoone, and Mary Jane Alm.

Wilson, an advertising executive and jingle writer, composed the music. The Twins bought the rights to the song from advertising agency Campbell Mithun for one dollar. The team asked Charles to revise the lyrics. The only lyrics change from the 1960s to the present was the change of the line "crack out a home run" to "knock out a home run" during the 1980s.
