= Sid Lerner =

American advertising executive and public health advocate (1930–2021)

- Born: December 10, 1930; New York City
- Died: January 12, 2021 (aged 90); New York City
- Occupations: advertising and marketing industry executive and public health advocate
- Known for: Meatless Mondays campaign

Sidney Lerner (December 10, 1930 – January 12, 2021) was an American advertising and marketing industry executive and public health advocate. He was considered one of the original "Mad Men" of the advertising world and later founded Meatless Mondays campaign.

== Early life and education ==
Lerner was born into a Jewish family to Mollie Lebowitz and Louis Lerner in New York City. He was first in his family of immigrant to go to college.

He graduated from the S.I. Newhouse School of Public Communications at Syracuse University in 1953 with a degree in English and journalism. At Syracuse, he served as the editor of "The Syracusan magazine" and was part of the Orange Key junior men's honorary organization.

== Advertising career ==
Considered one of the original "Mad Men" of Madison Avenue, Lerner's advertising and marketing career included work with Norman, Craig & Kummel, and Benton & Bowles advertising agencies as a creative director.

After graduation from Syracuse, Sid served in Army counter intelligence in Japan. Lerner began his career in the mailroom, from where he found a position in the ranks of copywriting at Benton & Bowles. During his career, he represented popular brands from Procter & Gamble, General Foods (Maxwell House), Texaco, Johnson Wax, and Charmin for which he helped created the memorable "Please Don’t Squeeze the Charmin" campaign featuring Mr. Whipple.

In April 1970, Lerner started Sid Lerner Associates, a consulting business for creative advertising and new product development. This business designed, co-produced and marketed licensed tennis, gifts and sporting good products for the gift and stationery trades.

== Public health advocacy ==
Lerner founded Meatless Mondays and Healthy Mondays campaigns in 2003. The program began at the Johns Hopkins Bloomberg School of Public Health, recommending Americans to abstain from meat one day a week for their health and the environment. It became a global movement, taking hold across the U.S. and growing in over 40 countries around the world.

According to Lerner, his father died of heart disease and his own diet was a catalyst for Meatless Mondays. Based on his doctor's advice Lerner modified his meat consumption, treating the protein more like a "condiment" than a main facet of a meal.

Lerner and his wife, Helaine Lerner funded the Lerner Center for Public Health Promotion to conduct, coordinate, and promote population and community health research, education, and outreach at the Maxwell & Newhouse Schools of Syracuse University in 2011, Johns Hopkins Bloomberg School of Public Health in 2014, and Mailman School of Public Health of Columbia University in 2014. He also established endowed positions at Johns Hopkins and NYU Langone to support health promotions.

Lerner was the president of Biorings LLC, which along with Weill Cornell medical researchers, developed non-hormonal contraceptives to prevent HIV transmission.

Lerner served on the Financial Services Leadership Forum Advisory Committee of the New York Public Library in 2010. He also worked with the American Jewish Committee.

== Awards ==
In 2013, Lerner received the George Arents award, Syracuse University's highest alumni honor for "his work in wellness, advertising and philanthropy".

In 2013, Lerner was awarded the Dean's Medal, the School's highest honor, by Johns Hopkins University's Bloomberg School of Public Health for "his vision and leadership in improving the health of the public through the Meatless Monday Campaign".

In 2019, Lerner received an honorary Doctor of Humane Letters degree from Johns Hopkins University.

== Works ==
Lerner wrote six non-fiction books, including:

- Monday morning quarterback. New York: Holt Rinehart & Winston. 1983. ISBN 9780030637766. OCLC 9685671.
- From the desk of. San Diego: Harcourt Brace Jovanovich. 1989. ISBN 9780151337958. OCLC 1200469579.
- Trash Cash, Fizzbos, and Flatliners. Boston: Houghton Mifflin. 1993. ISBN 9780395640203. OCLC 26807326.
- A Dictionary of New Words. Barnes & Noble. 1995. OCLC 1033647257.

== Death ==
Lerner died on January 12, 2021, aged 90, at his home in New York City.
