= Jason Chervokas =

American journalist, educator, writer, commentator, entrepreneur and musician

Jason Chervokas is an American journalist, educator, writer, commentator, entrepreneur and musician. Some of his writing focuses on cultural issues.

== Education ==
Chervokas obtained his degree from Columbia College and the Columbia School of Journalism.

== Career ==
Chervokas is the chief operating officer of New Paradigm Communications and political reporter for The Riverdale Press. He also served as venture partner at Primedia Ventures and taught journalism at Hunter College in New York City. Chervokas was co-host and co-producer of a nine-hour program covering George Clinton and compatriots called Funk Radio Thang.

== Awards and honors ==
Chervokas was the 1993 winner of the Emily Genauer Prize in Arts Criticism at the Columbia University Graduate School of Journalism for his work on jazz.

In 1995, New York named him to their "New York Cyber Sixty".

== Works ==
Chervokas co-founded @NY in 1995 with Tom Watson, a pioneering Internet publishing venture and the first publication to chronicle Silicon Alley. Since its launch, @NY has grown to more than 6,000. He is the author of the Uniform Hieroglyphic blog, and the creator of the popular American roots music podcast, Down in the Flood. His work has appeared in The New York Times, the Los Angeles Times, Pulse!, Wired, The Absolute Sound, Goldmine, and Stereophile.
