= Marc Stiegler =

American science fiction author and software developer

- Born: August 1, 1954 (age 72)
- Education: Heidelberg College, Virginia Tech
- Occupations: Author, software developer
- Writing career
- Genres: Science fiction, non-fiction
- Notable works: Valentina: Soul in Sapphire, David's Sling

Marc Stiegler (born August 1, 1954) is an American science fiction author and software developer. He co-authored Valentina: Soul in Sapphire (1984) with Joseph H. Delaney. His notable works also include David's Sling (1988), a techno-thriller that explores the concept of e-democracy.

Stiegler also wrote the short story "The Gentle Seduction", based on Vernor Vinge's ideas about a technological "singularity," the exponential growth of future technology that will drastically affect the human condition. The story's characters are augmented with molecular nanotechnology. The 'seducer' is the technology itself, and perhaps the programmers of the technology - the majority of mankind is more willing to swallow a pill that fixes one's back (this happens in the story) than take a pill that installs a computer in one's forehead (also from the story). He also realized that many humans do not have the mental fortitude to survive the Technological singularity. The heroine of "The Gentle Seduction" is a normal woman whose very elemental connection with her own identity is key in soothing humanity's jarring experience of finally meeting an alien mind.

Marc Stiegler's novel Earthweb envisions a future where computers are immune to attacks, the Web has evolved to largely replace government as the foundation of human civilization, and prediction markets are utilized to make informed decisions about significant future events.

Stiegler's career in software development somewhat mirrors his science fiction work. His non-fiction piece, "Hypermedia and the Singularity", predated the advent of the Web and postulated that hypertext would play a pivotal role in accelerating knowledge evolution. Shortly after penning this article, he assumed management of Project Xanadu, the hypertext system envisioned by Ted Nelson.

Subsequent software development endeavors included the creation of DecideRight (1995), which garnered the Software Publishing Association's CODIE Award for Best Numeric or Data Software Program. In the late 1990s, his focus shifted to computer security.

Later, he developed CapDesk, a capability-based desktop resilient to cyberattacks, and formulated the principles underpinning Polaris, an overlay for the Windows operating system designed to secure the system against various major types of computer viruses and trojan horses. He presented on object capability security at the RSA Conference in 2012 and 2013. During his tenure at HP Labs, his research incorporated approaches to security in planetary-scale computing.

== Bibliography ==
=== Books ===
- Valentina: Soul in Sapphire (1984), co-authored with Joseph H. Delaney ISBN 0-671-55916-8
- Programming Languages: Featuring the IBM PC and Compatibles (1985), co-authored with Bob Hanson
- David's Sling (1987) ISBN 0-671-65369-5
- Earthweb (1998) ISBN 0-671-57809-X

==== The Braintrust Series ====
- The Braintrust: A Harmony of Enemies (2017) ISBN 1-64202-001-X
- Crescendo of Fire (2018) ISBN 1-64202-0370
- Rhapsody For the Tempest (2018) ISBN 1-64202-064-8
- Ode To Defiance (2019) ISBN 1-64202-190-3
- Braintrust: Requiem (2020) ISBN 978-1-64202-796-9

==== The Dread Nought Series ====
- Triple Cross (2021) ISBN 978-1649719744
- Double Tap (2022) ASIN B09GS75KM3
- Power Play (2023) ASIN B09W1G5FVZ
- Zero Sum (forthcoming, 2023) ASIN B0BRJY4BKL

=== Collection ===
- The Gentle Seduction (1990) ISBN 0-671-69887-7
  - "Masters of the Mortal God" (1990)
  - "Too Loving a Touch" (1982)
  - "Petals of Rose" (1981)
  - "The Bully and the Crazy Boy" (1980)
  - "Evolution of Entropic Error in Closed Conservative Systems" (1982) - Non-fiction article
  - "A Simple Case of Suicide" (1983)
  - "The Gentle Seduction" (1989)
  - "Hypermedia and the Singularity" (1989) - Non-fiction article

=== Anthologies featuring stories by Marc Stiegler ===
- Nanodreams (1995)

=== Short works ===
The following three stories are included in the novel Valentina: Soul in Sapphire:

- "Valentina" (1984), co-authored with Joseph H Delaney - Hugo nominee
- "The Crystal Ball" (1984), co-authored with Joseph H Delaney
- "The Light in the Looking Glass" (1984), co-authored with Joseph H Delaney

== Awards ==
- Hugo Award for Best Novella finalist (1985) for "Valentina"
- Prometheus Award Best Novel finalist for:
  - David's Sling (1988)
  - The Braintrust (2018)
  - Ode to Defiance (2020)
