= Mr. Whipple =

Advertising character for Charmin toilet paper

Mr. George Whipple (also known as George the Grocer) is a fictional supermarket manager featured in television commercials, radio, and print advertisements that ran in the United States and Canada from 1964 to 1985 for Charmin toilet paper. Typically, Whipple scolds customers who "squeeze the Charmin," while hypocritically entertaining such actions himself when he thinks no one will notice. The character and catchphrase were created by John Chervokas of the agency Benton & Bowles. Prominent ad-man Sid Lerner also worked on the campaign.

== Background ==
The first commercial featuring Mr. Whipple set the tone of the advertising campaign, which Advertising Age designated as among the top 100 campaigns of the 20th century. Whipple is seen looking around the corner of the supermarket (either he is at the checkout or stocking shelves) at a female customer, commenting that first she is squeezing the tomatoes, then the melons, and then (in a classic comic "triple") when she arrives at the Charmin, he cannot contain himself and approaches her, uttering his famous plea "Please don't squeeze the Charmin!"

"Mr. Whipple" was played by Dick Wilson, a character actor who also appeared in many TV sitcoms during the 1960s and 1970s. Between 1964 and 1985, Wilson appeared as Whipple in more than 500 commercials for Charmin.

In some commercials Mr. Whipple was accompanied by a stock boy named Jimmy, played by Adam Savage, known decades later for the television series MythBusters. In the late 1970s and early 1980s, a competing grocer named Mr. Hoffmeier appeared in Charmin commercials as well. However, Hoffmeier encouraged his customers to squeeze the Charmin, and he scolded Whipple on his hypocrisy. By the late 1980s, Mr. Whipple was encouraging customers who weren't buying Charmin to squeeze it. One commercial featured him using a fishing rod to place the product in a skeptic's shopping cart.

In 1999, after a 14-year hiatus, Mr. Whipple returned in Charmin commercials explaining that he could not retire because he had to inform the public about Charmin. A later series of commercials featured him with the new slogan, "Is Mr. Whipple watching?" In 2000, Procter & Gamble presented Wilson with a lifetime achievement award as a Charmin subsequent advertising campaign began featuring the Charmin Bears, a family of anthropomorphic cartoon bears.

Wilson died of natural causes on November 19, 2007, at the age of 91, in California. Soon after, on November 28, 2007, a new Charmin commercial debuted on television, featuring old clips and paying tribute to Dick Wilson and Mr. Whipple.

== In culture ==
According to a 1970s survey, Mr. Whipple topped then-U.S. President Jimmy Carter as the most recognizable face in North America. According to Charmin makers Procter & Gamble, a 1978 survey found that Mr. Whipple was the third best-known American, behind former President Richard Nixon and evangelist Billy Graham.

The country song "Don't Squeeze My Sharmon," which was a Top 10 hit for Charlie Walker in 1967, was inspired by the advertising campaign for Charmin.

In 1985 the lyric "You better squeeze all the Charmin you can when Mr. Whipple's not around" was included in the "Weird Al" Yankovic song "Dare to Be Stupid".

The catchphrase "Don't squeeze the Chermin" was used in the 1986 comedy film Short Circuit when the main protagonist – Number 5 – defeats one of his sibling robots by causing him to crash into an outhouse.

In 2001 the lyric "Shake junt staring, I don't mean no harmin'/Call me Mr. Whipple cause I want to squeeze the Charmin" was included in the Project Pat song "Ooh Nuthin". In 2006 the lyric "You can call me Mr. Whipple, I won't do no harmin'/Never to the Charmin, come holla at me woman" was included in the Project Pat song "Good Googly Moogly".

Adam Savage, who portrayed Whipple's stockboy Jimmy in several commercials, paid tribute to Whipple on Savage's show MythBusters, showing a vintage Charmin commercial which features Savage. On an episode of the final season of MythBusters, Savage also dressed in a stockboy uniform, a nod to Savage's work with Charmin commercials.
