= Joseph H. Delaney =

American writer

Joseph Henry Delaney (February 5, 1932 – December 21, 1999) was a U.S. lawyer and science fiction writer. He was first published rather late in life, in 1982, and was most associated with Analog Science Fiction and Fact. He was nominated for the Hugo Award for Best Novella several times and win readers polls from Analog.

== Novels ==
- The New Untouchables (1982)
- Valentina: Soul in Sapphire (with Marc Stiegler; 1984)
- In the Face of My Enemy (1985)
- Lords Temporal (1987)

== Short stories ==
- Brainchild (1982)
- In the Face of My Enemy (1983)
- Star-B-Cue (1983)
- Chessmen (1984)
- The Crystal Ball (with Marc Stiegler; 1984)
- Dragon's Tooth (1984)
- The Light in the Looking Glass (with Marc Stiegler; 1984)
- The Next Logical Step (1984)
- The Shaman (1984)
- Thus Began the Death of Dreams (1984)
- Valentina (with Marc Stiegler; 1984)
- Painkillers (1985)
