= Technology company =

Company focused on technology

A technology company, or tech company, is a company that focuses primarily on the manufacturing, support, research and development of—most commonly computing, telecommunication and consumer electronics–based—technology-intensive products and services, which include businesses relating to digital electronics, software, optics, new energy, and Internet-related services such as cloud storage and e-commerce services. Big Tech refers to the six largest companies, (Note: Nvidia, Microsoft, Apple, Alphabet, Amazon, and Meta) both in the United States and globally, symbolized by the metonym 'Silicon Valley', where four of them are based. (Note: Nvidia, Apple, Alphabet, and Meta)

== Details ==
According to Fortune, as of 2020, the ten largest technology companies by revenue were: Apple Inc., Samsung, Foxconn, Alphabet Inc., Microsoft, Huawei, Dell Technologies, Hitachi, IBM, and Sony. Amazon has higher revenue than Apple, but is classified by Fortune in the retail sector. The most profitable listed in 2020 are Apple Inc., Microsoft, Alphabet Inc., Intel, Meta Platforms, Samsung, and Tencent.

Apple Inc., Alphabet Inc. (owner of Google), Meta Platforms (owner of Facebook), Microsoft, and Amazon.com, Inc. are often referred to as the Big Five multinational technology companies based in the United States. These five technology companies dominate major functions, e-commerce channels, and information of the entire Internet ecosystem. As of 2017, the Big Five had a combined valuation of over $3.3 trillion and make up more than 40 percent of the value of the Nasdaq-100 index.

Many large tech companies have a reputation for innovation, spending large sums of money annually on research and development. According to PwC's 2017 Global Innovation 1000 ranking, tech companies made up nine of the 20 most innovative companies in the world, with the top R&D spender (as measured by expenditure) being Amazon, followed by Alphabet Inc., and then Intel.

As a result of numerous influential tech companies and tech startups opening offices in proximity to one another, a number of technology districts have developed in various areas across the globe. These include: Silicon Valley in the San Francisco Bay Area, Silicon Wadi in Israel, Silicon Docks in Dublin, Silicon Hills in Austin, Tech City in London; Digital Media City in Seoul, Zhongguancun in Beijing, Cyberjaya in Malaysia and Cyberabad in Hyderabad, India.

As of 2026, Europe has six of the world's one hundred most valuable tech companies, compared with 56 in the United States and 16 in China.

== See also ==
- List of largest technology companies by revenue
- Big Tech, a grouping of the largest IT companies in the world
- Deep tech
- Dot-com company
- Outline of technology
