= Austin Ventures =

American private equity firm

- Type: Private
- Industry: Private equity
- Founded: 1979
- Founders: Joe Aragona, Ken DeAngelis, Bill Wood
- Headquarters: Austin, Texas, United States
- Products: Venture capital, Growth capital
- Total assets: $3.9 billion
- Number of employees: 60+
- Website: austinventures.com

Austin Ventures (AV) is an American private equity firm focused on venture capital and growth equity investments in business services and supply chain, financial services, new media, Internet, and information services companies nationally with a focus on Texas. The firm, which is based in Austin, Texas, was founded in 1984. AV has raised approximately $3.9 billion since inception across ten private equity funds.

== History ==
For decades, Austin Ventures was the largest and most powerful venture capital firm in Texas. However by 2015, the firm declined as its general partners took a different direction to focus on buyouts instead.

=== Early years ===
Austin Ventures was started in 1979 by Jack Crosby, a wealthy cable television entrepreneur, and initially concentrated on cable television and interim financing. The firm began investing in technology companies in the mid-1980s under new partners Ken DeAngelis, Joe Aragona and Bill Wood, who learned the field by co-investing alongside established venture firms including Kleiner Perkins and Sevin Rosen. By 1990 it had shifted its focus to technology and, as software companies emerged in Austin, began financing local startups.

=== Notable investments ===
Austin Ventures was among the first backers of Tivoli Systems, a software maker that went public in 1995 and was acquired by IBM in 1996; the firm's $2.5 million investment was reported to have returned an estimated $80 million. It was also an early investor in Silicon Laboratories. In 2006, software executive Brian Sharples launched HomeAway with a $50 million commitment from the firm, and by 2011 Austin Ventures was its largest shareholder, holding about 24.4 percent before the company's initial public offering.

=== Strategy after 2000 ===
After the dot-com bubble burst in 2000, the firm adapted its approach in order to survive the downturn. For its tenth fund, a $900 million vehicle raised in 2008, it adopted a hybrid model combining venture capital and private equity: about $600 million was earmarked for buyouts, roll-ups, minority investments in established companies, and backing veteran entrepreneurs to pursue new markets, while about $300 million was reserved for startups, mostly in Austin. One roll-up combined three transportation and logistics companies into Houston-based Port Logistics Group. In 2011 the firm said it had invested $1.6 billion in 185 Central Texas companies since its founding and estimated that the companies it backed had created 18,600 jobs in Austin.

=== Decline and breakup ===
Austin Ventures raised ten flagship funds, the last of which closed in late 2008. According to Fortune, efforts to raise an eleventh fund failed, reportedly because of mediocre returns and the departure of growth-equity investors Phil Siegel and David Lack, who left to form Tritium Partners In early 2015 the firm's partners decided to split: Joe Aragona's group began pursuing a mid-market buyout fund, while Chris Pacitti planned a separate early-stage "pledge fund," with neither expected to use the Austin Ventures name. Both sides continued to manage a remaining portfolio of about 50 companies.

== See also ==
- Silicon Hills
