= David's Sling (novel) =

1988 science fiction novel by Marc Stiegler

- Author: Marc Stiegler
- Cover artist: David Mattingly
- Language: English
- Genre: Techno-thriller
- Publisher: Baen Publishing Enterprises
- Publication date: 1988
- Publication place: United States
- Pages: 346 (first edition)
- ISBN: 0-671-65369-5

David's Sling is a speculative fiction novel written by Marc Stiegler and published in 1988.

== Reception ==
Stanley Schmidt from Analog Magazine suggested that the novel "should be required reading for all politicians".

The novel was a finalist for the Best Novel category in the Prometheus Awards.
