= BioValley =

BioValley may refer to:

- Biotechnology industrial park, a generic term
- BioValley (Europe)
- BioValley (Malaysia)
- Bionic Valley (Utah)

== See also ==
- Silicon Alley
- Silicon Hills
- Silicon Valley
- Tech Valley
