= EarthWeb =

1999 science fiction novel by Marc Stiegler

- Author: Marc Stiegler
- Language: English
- Publisher: Baen Publishing Enterprises
- Publication date: May 1999
- Publication place: United States
- ISBN: 0671-57809-X

EarthWeb is a science fiction novel written by American author Marc Stiegler, published in May 1999 by Baen Books. EarthWeb is set in a future where Earth faces a recurring attack every five years by a massive spaceship of unknown origin. Named Shivas, after the Hindu deity, these ships are vast, robot-crewed, and progressively more advanced. The apparent ultimate goal of the Shivas is the total extermination of the human population on Earth.

Highly trained hero commando squads, known as Angels, infiltrate and attempt to destroy each Shiva using data gathered through an expanded, global version of the internet.

A crucial feature of this web are the 'castpoints' (derived from 'forecast') where individuals can wager money on the internal layout of each Shiva and the potential solutions to various problems the Angels might encounter within the ship. The betting system ensures the prominence of beneficial ideas (those most wagered on), and rewards those skilled at identifying these good ideas by increasing their winnings, thereby enhancing their influence on future idea selection.
