= Seth Goldstein =

American entrepreneur and angel investor (born 1970)

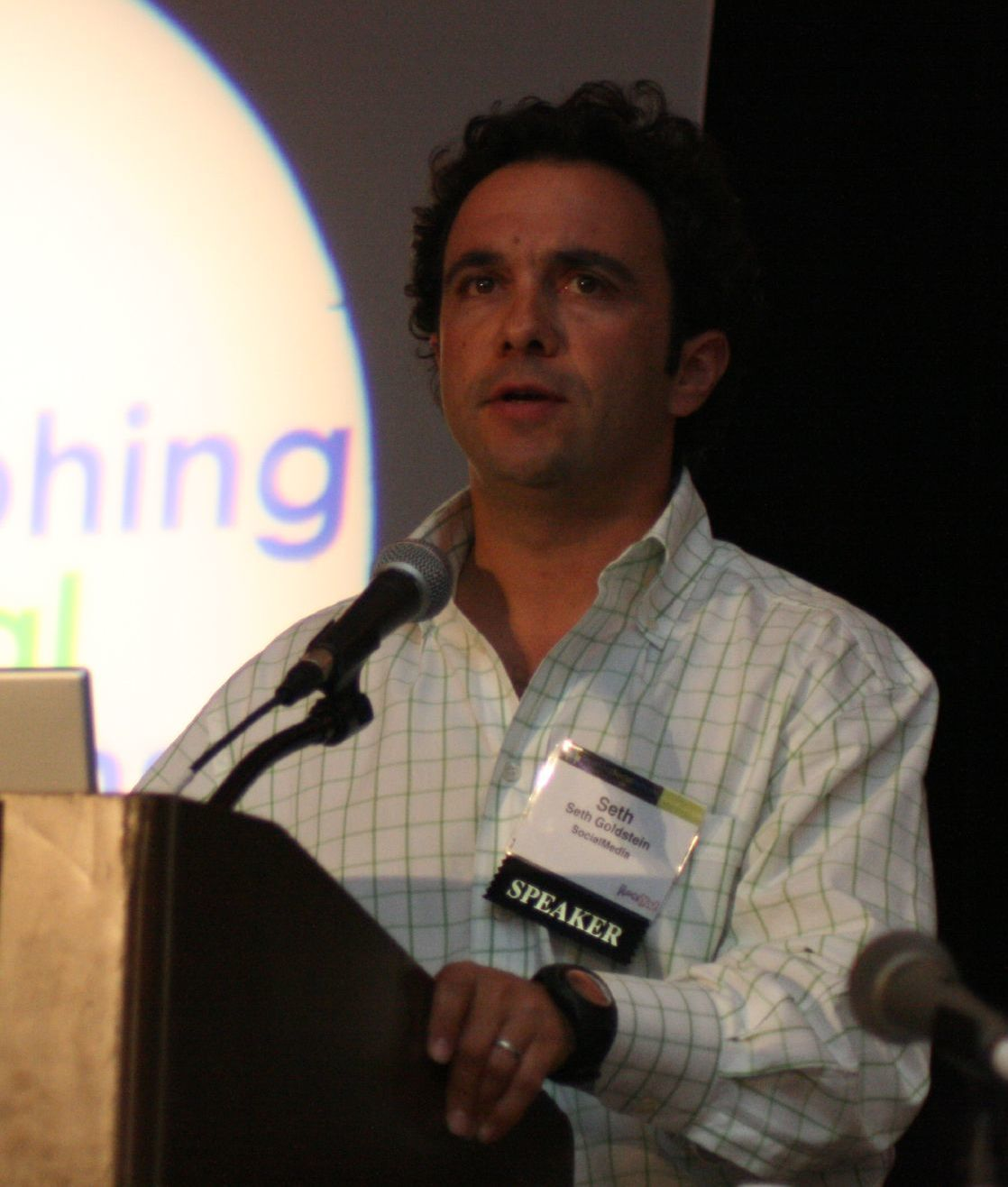
- Born: 1970 (age 55–56); Waltham, Massachusetts
- Education: Columbia University
- Occupations: Entrepreneur; Angel investor
- Years active: 1993 – Present
- Notable work: The Secret of Raising Money (co-authored with Michael Simpson)

Seth Goldstein (born 1970) is an American entrepreneur and angel investor. He has founded or co-founded six companies, including Crossfader, Turntable.fm, SiteSpecific, SocialMedia, and Majestic Research.

== Early life and education ==
Goldstein was born in Waltham, Massachusetts. His father, Larry, was a software engineer, and his mother Faye, was an entrepreneur. He started acting as a child, and began to perform professionally at the age of 10.

Goldstein attended high school at Newton South and spent his senior year at Interlochen Arts Academy, a private boarding school focused on the performing arts in Interlochen, Michigan. He attended college at Columbia University, where, as a student, he founded the Columbia Theater Network (CTN). Goldstein graduated in 1992 with a degree in dramatic literature.

== Career ==
=== 1993–2001: Riverbed Media, SiteSpecific, Flatiron Partners ===
Following his graduation, Goldstein worked as an archivist for Robert Wilson's Byrd Hoffman Foundation and then founded Riverhead Media with multi-media artist Paul Kaiser and publisher Joost Effers. In 1993 he received a fellowship and moved to Frankfurt, Germany where he was a multi-media artist-in-residence at the Center for Art and Media Technology, and later initiated the creation of a production and research laboratory for multimedia applications at Jeff Shaw's ZKM Institute for VisualMedia. While in Frankfurt, Goldstein also worked for the Frankfurt Ballet and collaborated with its director William Forsythe on the creation of Improvisation Technologies, a CD-ROM that illustrated Forsythe's choreographic method. He returned to New York in late 1994, and worked briefly as an HTML producer for agency.com, Wolff New Media, and at Condé Nast. While there, he heard about an opportunity to create an internet presence for Duracell, and in 1995, he and David Byman co-founded SiteSpecific, an interactive marketing company.

Launched in Goldstein's apartment with computers financed through credit cards, SiteSpecific's initial focus was on Duracell. With a staff of three, the company developed a brand awareness campaign which included seeding images of the batteries on major internet sites. SiteSpecific later won a Clio for their work on the Duracell corporate site. Site Specific was acquired by CKS Group in May 1997 for $6.5 million.

In 1998 Goldstein joined the VC firm Flatiron Partners, founded by Fred Wilson and Jerry Colonna. An entrepreneur-in-residence and investment principal, he built and managed a $75 million new-technology portfolio of pervasive computing investments.

=== 2002–2010: Majestic Research, Root Market, SocialMedia ===
After the dot-com collapse of 2001, in 2003, Goldstein launched Majestic Research, an investment research company which used ComScore and other data to generate proprietary guidance for buy side funds. He served as the company's founding CEO and then chairman until 2010, when the company was acquired by Investment Technology Group for $75 million.

In January 2005, with Jerry Neumann and Candice Sherman, Goldstein co-founded Root Markets, a financial exchange allowing consumers to sell online data about themselves. In late 2006, he and his family moved to the Bay Area, and in 2007, he launched SocialMedia.com, a social advertising platform for publishers. With Dave Gentzel, a 24-year-old programmer, Goldstein developed an app that let people throw virtual items of food at one another. To acquire the virtual food, users paid with virtual currency; to acquire the currency, users answered questions posed by marketers. Called FoodFight, it attracted 2 million users. FoodFight was followed by successful apps including, Happyhour and Appaholic, and SocialMedia. The company was sold to LivingSocial in 2011 for an undisclosed amount.

=== 2010–Present: Stickybits, Turntable.fm, Crossfader, DJZ, LiveAds ===
In 2010, Goldstein launched Stickybits with Billy Chasen, an artist and programmer he had met in 2006. Originally envisioned as "digital graffiti," it enabled users to attach digital media to real-world objects using barcodes which could be read by smartphones. Stickybits launched with 300,000 Stickybits at SXSW in 2010, but struggled to become sustainable. Chasen and Goldstein subsequently relaunched the company as Turntable.fm. 'An "egalitarian online social music platform," it attracted more than 600,000 users in four months and raised $7 million in funding at a $37 million valuation. In early 2012, after disagreements over Turntable.fm's direction, Goldstein began to shift his focus towards new projects while remaining chairman of the company.

A lifelong music fan, Goldstein was exposed to Electronic dance music while at Turntable.fm and at festivals such as Burning Man. In September 2012, he launched DJZ, a content site which combined editorial, videos, DJ mixes, interviews, contests, and links to pages for popular DJs. It also offered a free iPhone app, called DJZTxT, that allowed users to create dance music through text messages using emojis. It was funded by Index Ventures, True Ventures and Google Ventures, in addition to Troy Carter and Shari Redstone.

While at DJZ, Goldstein developed an app with iOS engineer Ilias Karim. Called Crossfader, it allowed users to create their own music through an iPhone-based remix and DJ platform that used loops and filters controlled by a gyroscope and accelerometer.

In July 2016, he founded LiveAds, a creative agency and production studio.

In 2021, Goldstein founded Bright Moments, an NFT art gallery and decentralized autonomous organization (DAO) that began in Venice Beach, California and pioneered in-person "live minting" of generative art.

== Activism, philanthropy, and related work ==
Goldstein was the founding co-chairman of the Interactive Advertising Bureau's User Generated Content and Social Media committee, which set standard definitions, common metrics and industry best practices for the social media advertising industry. He has been an active advisor to the US State Department Global Entrepreneurship Program, and has traveled to Egypt, Greece and Turkey to as part of the program. In 2005, he co-founded the non-profit organization Attention Trust. It distributed free software designed to act as an interface between Web users and marketers and educated internet users on issues related to the marketing value of their online activities.

Goldstein co-wrote The Secret to Raising Money with Michael Simpson. It was published in 2012. He has spoken at conferences including Billboard magazine's FutureSound, the IAB Annual Leadership Forum, Big Omaha, and O'Reilly Web 2.0.

== Personal ==
The father of two sons, Goldstein lives in Marin County, California.

== Investments (partial list) ==
- Betaworks
- bit.ly
- Brit + Co.
- Del.icio.us
- Etherpad
- Gumroad
- Joyride
- Philz Coffee
- Poshmark

== Boards and affiliations ==
- Attention Trust, Founder, 2005–present
- Director, Valassis, June 1999 – April 2006
- Director & Co-chair, Social Media Committee, Internet Advertising Bureau, April 2009 – April 2011
