= Tech Valley High School =

Coordinates: 42°41′30″N 73°50′09″W

- 246 Tricentennial Drive; Albany, New York 12203; United States; Capital District of New York

Information
- Type: Public high school
- Motto: Innovative. Authentic. Student-centered.
- Established: 2005, opened in 2007
- School board: Tech Valley High School Board of Education
- Superintendent: John Yagielski of Capital Region BOCES and Gladys I. Cruz of Questar III
- Principal: Amy Hawrylchak
- Grades: 9—12
- Enrollment: Approximately 130
- Website: http://techvalleyhigh.org/

Tech Valley High School is a four-year regional public high school. It is located on the campus of the SUNY Polytechnic Institute Colleges of Nanoscale Science and Engineering in Albany, New York, United States. The school opened in September 2007 with a first class of 40 students. Its first class graduated in June 2011 on the campus of the University at Albany.

== History ==
The idea for a high-tech consortium school arose around 2003, according to former Supterintendent of Capital Region BOCES (Board of Cooperative Educational Services), a regional entity serving multiple school districts, Barbara Nagler, and Superintendent of Questar III, James Baldwin. Former Governor George Pataki signed a bill which established TVHS in November 2005.

By November 2006, the board of education was named and given the tasks of creating a curriculum around project-based learning, working more closely with local businesses and places of higher education than typical public schools, and spreading the lessons learned on this new form of education to the component school districts of Capital Region BOCES and Questar III. Board of education members were selected from the boards of education of Capital Region BOCES and Questar III. Also in that month, the principal, Daniel Liebert, and director of institutional advancement, Raona Roy, were named.

The school opened in September 2007, leasing space from MapInfo in the Rensselaer Technology Park in North Greenbush. TVHS has since moved to the East Campus of SUNY Albany, and then in 2014 to its current building on the SUNY Poly College of Nanoscale Science and Engineering Campus in Albany.

== Administration ==
Tech Valley High is not under the jurisdiction of one school district, as is the case of almost all high schools in New York. Rather it is a consortium high school available to any student from any of the component school districts of two Boards of Cooperative Educational Services (BOCES) in New York's Capital District: Capital Region BOCES and Questar III (Rensselaer-Columbia-Greene BOCES). Any student may apply during eighth grade to attend Tech Valley High for their high school career. The participating component districts respectively determine how many slots they will each support, and then students are selected by lottery.

Students are not required to pay tuition to attend TVHS; the student's home school district pays its respective BOCES (Capital Region or Questar III, depending on location) tuition for the student to attend the school.

== Curriculum ==
All public high schools in New York State are required to follow standards set forth by the Board of Regents of the University of the State of New York, under the direction of the Commissioner of Education and the New York State Education Department. This includes requirements for students to take and pass Regents Examinations. While in traditional high schools, students are taught in classrooms with homework, examinations, projects, and note-taking, TVHS bases its curriculum on project-based learning in a high-tech setting.

TVHS fulfills its students' foreign language requirement by offering Mandarin Chinese.

Even though students spend all four years of their high school career at TVHS, their diploma actually comes from their home school district.

== See also ==
- New York State Education Department
- University of the State of New York
- List of school districts in New York
