= Turntable.fm =

Website

- Available in: English
- Creators: Billy Chasen; Joseph Perla; Seth Goldstein
- Website: www.turntable.fm
- Registration: Required email confirmation account
- Launched: May 2011; 15 years ago
- Current status: Shut down on December 2, 2013

Turntable.fm was a social media website that allowed users to collaboratively stream music. In 2011, Billy Chasen as CEO, Joseph Perla as VP of Technology, and the team at Stickybits, together developed and launched the first version of a social music service named Turntable. Turntable was created as a pivot after the company's first product, Stickybits, failed to gain sufficient traction. The service allowed users to create "rooms," which other users could join. Designated users, so-called "DJs," chose songs to be played to everyone in that room, while all users were able to talk with one another through a text interface. The service opened to the public in May 2011, and by late June had already reached 140,000 active users. The company used the Digital Millennium Copyright Act to license the music that was played on the website; because of this, only individuals from the United States were allowed to use the service. The site shut down in December 2013.

== Usage ==
Turntable.fm combined "music-streaming, chat rooms, and voting" by simulating a virtual environment filled with audience members and DJs represented by player avatars. Rooms were set up around certain musical genres, moods, or real-world atmospheres. When users were present in a particular room they were represented by their avatar who appeared as an attendant in the audience. If there were open DJ spots, users could "hop up" on to a DJ turntable and play music for the rest of the room. The DJ either provided a song that they possess on their local computer or selected a song from Turntable.fm's library. Available platforms to access the service included the hosting website, a Facebook application, an iPhone app, and an Android App.

The users who were in the audience could vote on songs played by a DJ by clicking the "lame" or "awesome" buttons. Too many "lame" votes triggered the room to skip to the next DJ while "awesome" votes gave DJ points to the current DJ. If a user decided to click the "awesome" button, their character began to sway their head back and forth, simulating how a fan would react to a song they liked in a club. More DJ points allowed for users to unlock additional avatars. The service additionally allowed users to chat in the rooms and to "follow" other users.

Turntable.fm later created a paid feature known as "Turntable Gold". This allowed the users to have an ad-free interface, post .gifs and .jpg/.png files, and have access to special characters. The service allowed you to pick your price per month, from $1, up. This "Turntable Gold" helped fund the website and develop new features, such as Turntable Live.

== History ==
Turntable.fm was created as a pivot in January 2011 by Billy Chasen as CEO, Joseph Perla as VP of Technology, and Seth Goldstein, after the failure of the company's first product, known as Stickybits. Stickybits was a mobile app where brands could stick barcodes on their products and allow users to scan them for rewards. While Stickybits was picked up by some brands, it failed to gain the widespread attention of users. By January 2011 it became clear that Stickybits would not work, so Chasen, Goldstein, Joseph Perla, Summer Bedard, and Yang Yang began building the first version of turntable.fm. By May, turntable.fm was released, and within weeks the site went viral with such celebrities as Sir Mix-A-Lot using it. The board then pulled the plug on Stickybits and went ahead with turntable.fm.

By July 2011, turntable.fm raised a $7 million round at a $35 million valuation in a funding led by Fred Wilson at Union Square Ventures. All initial investors of Stickybits were involved in the round, including First Round Capital, Polaris Venture Partners, and Lowercase Capital. A number of entertainment executives have also invested, including Lady Gaga, Kanye West, Troy Carter, MTV's Courtney Holt, former Facebook executive Tim Kendall, The Roots, and Madonna's manager, Guy Oseary. By September 2011, turntable.fm had been used by over 600,000 people and streamed around 1 million songs per day.

On July 28, 2011, a turntable.fm dance party was held at The Canal Room in New York City which simulated the features of the website in real life. DJs were chosen from an applicant pool prior to the party and were allowed to play songs in turns during the celebration. DJs were rewarded with "points" for how many patrons were on the dance floor during a given DJ's song. If too few patrons were on the floor or there was a general lack of interest, DJs would have their turn skipped. The Australian electronic music act Knife Party notably made a surprise appearance to play on the site, attracting over 20,000 listeners.

On November 22, 2013, it was announced that Turntable.fm would be shut down in December 2013 in order to focus on its Turntable Live service, which allowed musicians to perform interactive online concerts.

== Legal ==
Turntable originally had no deals in place with any record labels, and was instead operating under provisions in the Digital Millennium Copyright Act which allow "non-interactive" online radio services to operate without needing to individually negotiate licensing deals with individual labels. The service also had a partnership with Medianet to supply a library of songs for those who do not wish to supply their own music. Due to its reliance on these laws, only residents of the United States could use the service. In a similar manner to other services such as Pandora Radio and 8tracks, users were also prohibited from playing music in a room by themselves, there were limits to the number of times one can play a song every hour, and people could not see the songs that would be played next.

Following this period of operating in a "legally dubious gray area" and relying on DMCA protections, the site officially signed a deal with ASCAP in July 2011 that ensured songwriters, composers and publishers would be appropriately compensated for their works being used on Turntable, effectively making the site completely legal. On March 13, 2012, Turntable announced that it had secured licensing deals with all four major music labels.

== Connections ==
When users were first able to access the Turntable beta, the only way to log in was by using one's Facebook credentials, and only if one had another Facebook friend who was already a Turntable user. Chasen announced that as of September 23, 2011, the site dropped the requirement of needing a Facebook friend already on Turntable in order to use it. If one had Facebook friends online on Turntable at the same time they were, it would show what room they are in, in order to facilitate connections between users.

Turntable released an iPhone app in September 2011, accessible with any iOS device with iOS 4.0 or greater. While some features like creating and joining a group took a bit longer, the iOS app had all features available on the desktop version.

While listening to a song, users could hover over the DJ panel booth to see connections to other music services such as Spotify, iTunes, and Last.fm and click on the icon to add the current track to their account with that program. Additionally, there were buttons at the top of the rooms for various social networks like Facebook and Twitter, as well as email and Permalink, so users could share the room they are in with their friends.

On May 11, 2012, Turntable released a version of their app for Android devices.

== Closure ==
On December 2, 2013, Turntable officially shut down the website. After two years providing music interaction with users, Turntable announced that it would focus on Turntable Live. However this was short lived and the last show for Turntable Live was Shinobi Ninja on December 13, 2013.

== Spin-Off Companies and Controversy ==
In 2021, former Turntable.fm CEO Billy Chasen launched a social music streaming offering on the domain Turntable.fm, under the company Testcode, requiring a password to access the site. A social music streaming service run by Joseph Perla, former VP of Technology at the original Turntable.fm, also appeared online as a subscription service using the branding turntable.org and tt.fm. As of October 2024, the two companies are known as Deepcut.fm (led by Billy Chasen) and Turntable Labs / Hangout (led by Joseph Perla.) As of November 4, 2024, Hangout offers a Discord server and a waitlist for their application. The Hangout website describes Hangout as "Host your own private hangout, vibe with friends, chat with strangers, enjoy the tunes." As of November 4, 2024, Deepcut's website describes their application as "Deepcut connects you, your friends and others in a real time music listening experience."
