= Razorfish =

Razorfish or razor fish may refer to:

== Species ==
=== Fish ===
A common name used for three unrelated groups of fishes:

- The genera Aeoliscus, and Centriscus, also known as shrimpfishes, in the family Centriscidae
- The genus Xyrichtys of the family Labridae
- The species Aeoliscus strigatus

=== Bivalves ===
- The razor shell Ensis arcuatus, sometimes called razor fish
- Pinna bicolor, a species of large saltwater clam in the family Pinnidae

== Other uses ==
- Razorfish (company), an advertising agency

== See also ==
- Razor surgeonfish
