= Dick Wilson =

British-American actor (1916–2007)

- Wilson in Bewitched (1965)
- Born: July 30, 1916; Preston, Lancashire, England
- Died: November 18, 2007 (aged 91); Woodland Hills, California, U.S.
- Resting place: Forest Lawn Memorial Park, Hollywood Hills, California, U.S.
- Occupation: Actor
- Years active: 1956–89, 1999–2000
- Spouse: Meg Wilson (m. 1950)
- Children: 3, including Melanie

Dick Wilson (July 30, 1916 – November 18, 2007) was a British-American actor. He was best known as grocery store manager Mr. George Whipple in more than 500 Charmin bathroom tissue television commercials (1965–89, 1999–2000).

== Biography ==
Wilson was born on July 30, 1916, in Preston, Lancashire. His father soon moved the family to Hamilton, Ontario, Canada. He got his start in show business with a part-time job at CHML radio in Hamilton at age 15. He graduated from the Ontario College of Art & Design. Paid in dance lessons, he became a comedic acrobatic dancer and performed in vaudeville for 20 years, according to Procter & Gamble.

Wilson had taught himself to fly when he was 16 years old, working for a time as a bush pilot who flew supplies to mining camps in remote regions of Canada. His earlier experience got him into military flight training and he became a bomber pilot. After the Second World War where he served in the Royal Canadian Air Force and Royal Air Force, he moved to the United States and became an American citizen in 1954, heading to California that same year to work as a film and television actor.

Wilson made numerous appearances on Bewitched. He also appeared on Tabitha and McHale's Navy. He also appeared on The Donna Reed Show, Hogan's Heroes, and The Bob Newhart Show. Wilson was quoted as saying, "I've done thirty-eight pictures and nobody remembers any of them, but they all remember me selling toilet paper." He made 504 commercials as Mr. Whipple, earning U.S. $300,000 annually while working only 12–16 days a year.

In an interview with ABC News on April 22, 1983, he mentioned that the first series of commercials for Charmin he appeared in were filmed in, appropriately enough, Flushing, New York City. He described acting in commercials as "the hardest thing to do in the entire acting realm. You've got 24 seconds to introduce yourself, introduce the product, say something nice about it and get off gracefully."

== Death ==
Wilson died on November 18, 2007, at the Motion Picture and Television Hospital in Woodland Hills, California, at the age of 91. He was survived by his wife, Meg; his son, Stuart F. Wilson (a stunt coordinator); his two daughters (Wendy Wilson and actress Melanie Wilson); and his five grandchildren. He is buried at Forest Lawn Memorial Park, Hollywood Hills.

== Filmography ==
- The Adventures of Jim Bowie (1956, TV Series) — Woodsman
- The Tattered Dress (1957) — First Jury Foreman (uncredited)
- Jane Wyman Presents The Fireside Theatre (1958, TV Series) — Alex
- Sergeant Preston of the Yukon (1956–1958, TV Series) — Beaver Louie, Jake Lucas
- Wagon Train (1958, TV Series) — Bartender
- The Texan (1958, TV Series) — Norm Seevey
- Official Detective (1958, US series - Episode: "Loan Companies") — Injured Man (uncredited)
- Tales of Wells Fargo (1959, TV Series) — The Cafe Owner
- The Untouchables (1959, TV Series) — Sheriff Wilson
- M Squad (1958–1960, TV Series) — Max
- Maverick (1960, TV Series) — Crenshaw
- The Rifleman (1960, TV Series) — Fred — Buckshot Patient
- The Millionaire (1960, TV Series) — Sullvian
- Bat Masterson (1961, TV Series) — Tobias Tinker
- The Deputy (1961, TV Series) — Barber
- The Lawless Years (1959–1961, TV Series) — Charley
- The Bob Cummings Show (1961, TV Series)
- X-15 (1961) — Flight Engineer (uncredited)
- Checkmate (1962, TV Series) — Clerk
- Our Man Higgins (1962, TV Series) — Fletcher
- The Virginian (1962, TV Series) — Bartender
- Perry Mason (1963, TV Series) — Prisoner
- Diary of a Madman (1963) — Martin
- Ben Casey (1963, TV Series) — Jake Martin
- Glynis (1963, TV Series)' — Danny
- The Twilight Zone
  - Episode: Escape Clause (1959) — Insurance Man #1
  - Episode: Ninety Years Without Slumbering S5 E12 (1963) — Clock Mover
- The Great Adventure (1964, TV Series) — Mr. Metcalf
- What a Way to Go! (1964) — Driscoll (uncredited)
- Bob Hope Presents the Chrysler Theatre (1964, TV Series)
- My Living Doll (1964, TV Series) — Salesman
- My Favorite Martian
  - Episode: How to be a Hero Without Really Trying (1963) — Patrol Man No. 2
  - Episode: Uncle Martin's Broadcast (1964) - Charlie
  - Episode: The Night Life of Uncle Martin (1964) — Davey
- Gomer Pyle, U.S.M.C. (1964, TV Series) — Clerk #3
- John Goldfarb, Please Come Home! (1965) — Frobish (Whitepaper's assistant) (as Richard Wilson)
- The Fugitive (1965, TV Series) — Berger
- The Loner (1965, TV Series) — Bartender
- Gidget (1965, TV Series) — Mr. Lefferts
- Bewitched (1965, Episode 8 "The Very Informal Dress") — Montague
- The Munsters (1965, TV Series) — Al
- McHale's Navy (1965–1966, TV Series) — Dino Baroni
- Our Man Flint (1966) — Supervisor of conditioning (uncredited)
- The Ghost and Mr. Chicken (1966) — Bandmaster (uncredited)
- My Mother the Car (1966, TV Series) — Jenkins
- Bewitched (1966, TV Series) - Mr Solow
- The Jean Arthur Show (1966, TV Series) — Angelo Liguori
- The Hero (1966, TV Series)
- Occasional Wife (1967, TV Series) — Waiter
- That Girl (1967, TV Series) — Clerk
- Caprice (1967) — Headwaiter (uncredited)
- Petticoat Junction (1967, TV Series) — Airline Clerk
- The Flying Nun (1967, TV Series) — Joe
- Stay Away, Joe (1968) — Car salesman (uncredited)
- The Shakiest Gun in the West (1968) — Black Eagle (Indian chief) (uncredited)
- Star! (1968) — Drunk (uncredited)
- Get Smart (1966–1968, TV Series) — Creevley, Spiegel
- Mayberry R.F.D. (1968, TV Series) — Ralph Carr
- Bewitched (1968, Episode 8 "Is It Magic Or Imagination") — man in bar
- The Queen and I (1969, TV Series) — Man
- I Dream of Jeannie(1966–1969, TV Series) — Dockweiler
- Bracken's World (1969) — Harry
- The Good Guys (1969, TV Series) — Ira
- The Partridge Family (1971, TV Series) — Cowboy
- Hogan's Heroes (1966–1971, TV Series) — Captain Gruber. Wilson also played Count von Hertzel, as listed in the credits in season five Hogan's Heroes episode 19 entitled "Gowns by Yvette" (most recently airing 8/11/25 on MeTV).
- Marcus Welby, M.D. (1971, TV Series) — Health Faddist
- Nanny and the Professor (1971, TV Series) — Simon Mehlin
- Love, American Style (1971, TV Series) — Mr. Hutton (segment Love and the Bashful Groom)
- McMillan & Wife (1972, TV Series) — Simon Mehlin
- Getting Away from It All (1972, TV Movie) — Kirk Lecount
- Bewitched (1965–1972, TV Series) — Drunk
- The World's Greatest Athlete (1973, TV Movie) — Drunk in bar
- Love Thy Neighbor (1973, TV Series)
- Adam-12 (1973, TV Series) — Louis Nelson
- The Whiz Kid and the Mystery at Riverton (1974, TV Series) — Mr. Hodges
- Disneyland (1974, TV Series) — Mr. Hodges
- The Bob Newhart Show (1973–1975, TV Series) — Man
- Maude (1975–1976, TV Series) — Man
- Tabitha (1977, TV Series) — Mr. Green
- Fantasy Island (1978, TV Series) — Minister
- The Pirate (1978, TV Series) — Drunk
- Alice (1979, TV Series) — Drunk
- Presenting Susan Anton (1979, TV Series) — Regular
- Better Late Than Never (1979, TV Movie)
- Quincy, M.E. (1980, TV Series) — Car salesman
- The Incredible Shrinking Woman (1981) — Store Manager
- Get Out of My Room (1985)
- Mathnet (1987) — Grocer
- Square One TV (1987, TV Series) — Grocer
