= Tech Valley =

Coordinates: 43°0′N 73°30′W

- Region
- Etymology: From "Tech" for the high-tech industries and "Valley" for the Hudson Valley
- Country: United States
- State: New York
- Region: Upstate New York
- Counties: Albany, Rensselaer, Schenectady, Saratoga, Schoharie, Warren, Washington, Columbia, Montgomery, Fulton, Greene, Essex, Clinton, Hamilton, Herkimer, Ulster, Dutchess, Franklin, Orange
- Cities: Albany, Schenectady, Troy, Newburgh, Poughkeepsie, Plattsburgh, Kingston, Glens Falls

Area
  - Total: 15,637 sq mi (40,500 km^{2})

Population (2010)
  - Total: 2,312,952
  - Density: 147.92/sq mi (57.110/km^{2})
- Time zone: UTC-5 (Eastern Standard Time)
  - Summer (DST): UTC-4 (Eastern Daylight Time)
- Area code: 518 and 845
- Website: http://www.techvalley.org

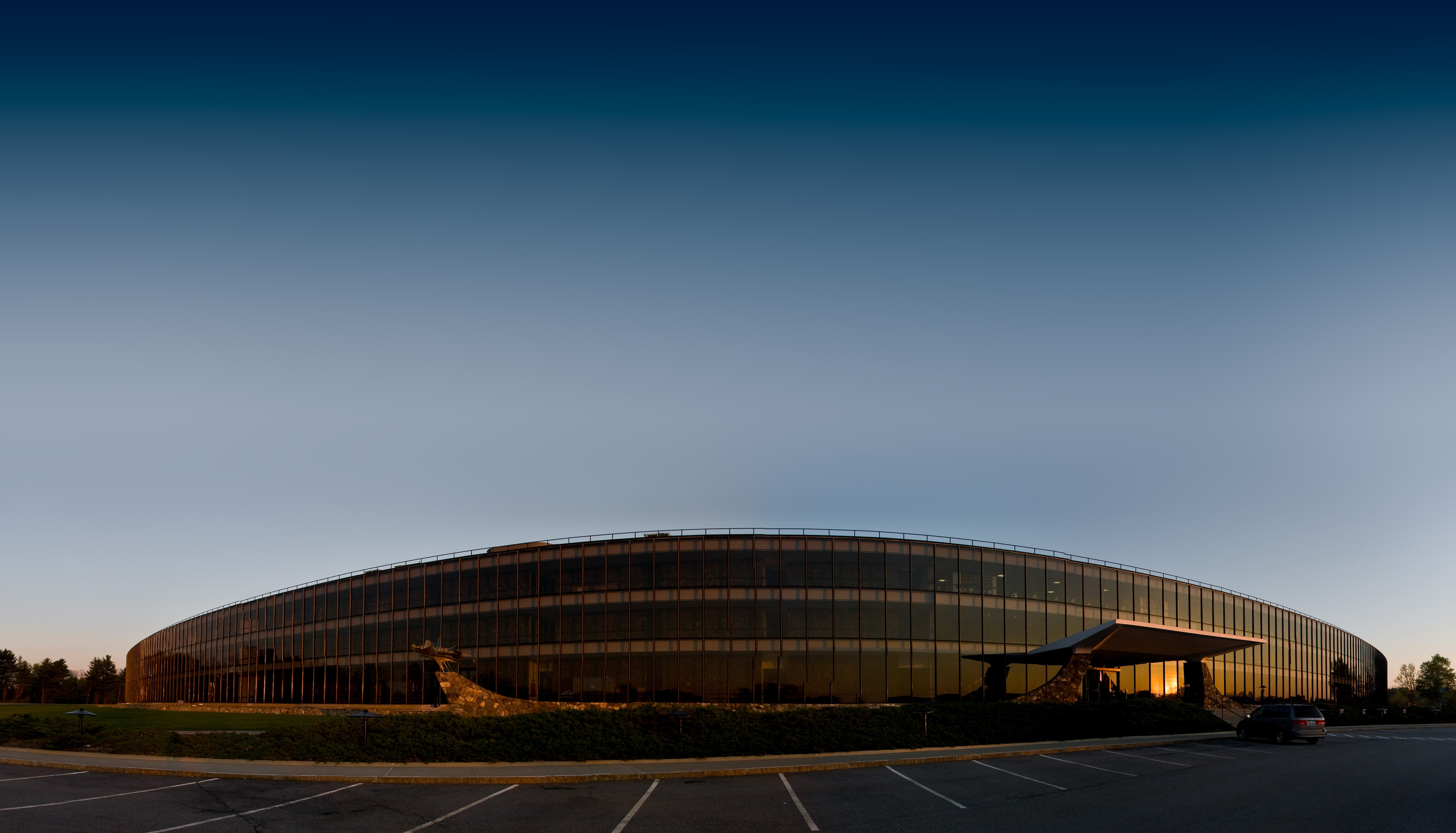
The main laboratory building of the IBM Watson Research Center is located in Yorktown Heights, New York.

Tech Valley began as a marketing name for the eastern part of the U.S. state of New York, encompassing the Capital District and the Hudson Valley. Originating in 1998 to promote the greater Albany area as a high-tech competitor to regions such as Silicon Valley and Boston, the moniker subsequently grew to represent the counties in New York between IBM's Westchester County plants in the south and the Canada–United States border to the north, and has since evolved to constitute both the technologically oriented metonym and the geographic territory comprising most of New York State north of New York City. The area's high technology ecosystem is supported by technologically focused academic institutions including Rensselaer Polytechnic Institute and the State University of New York Polytechnic Institute.

Tech Valley grew to encompass 19 counties straddling both sides of the Adirondack Northway and the New York Thruway, and with heavy state taxpayer subsidy, has experienced significant growth in the computer hardware side of the high-technology industry, with great strides in the nanotechnology sector, digital electronics design, and water- and electricity-dependent integrated microchip circuit manufacturing, involving companies including IBM in Armonk and its Thomas J. Watson Research Center in Yorktown Heights, GlobalFoundries in Malta, and others. As of August 2022, venture capital investment in Tech Valley had grown to US$410.92 million. Westchester County has developed a burgeoning biotechnology sector in the 21st century, with over US$1 billion in planned private investment as of 2016, earning the county the nickname Biochester. In April 2021, GlobalFoundries, a company specializing in the semiconductor industry, moved its headquarters from Silicon Valley, California to its most advanced semiconductor-chip manufacturing facility in Saratoga County, New York near a section of the Adirondack Northway, in Malta, New York, which was upgraded to accommodate quantum computing hardware production. The region is a burgeoning center for AI-based photonics.

== History ==
The name "Tech Valley", or "Techneurial Valley" as was originally used, is usually credited to Wallace "Wally" Altes, a former president of the Albany-Colonie Regional Chamber of Commerce ("the Chamber"), while the shortened name from "Techneurial" to "Tech" was the idea of Jay Burgess. In 1998, the Albany-Colonie Chamber began using Tech Valley as a marketing name for an initial ten-county area centered on New York's Capital District to show in name the merging of entrepreneurial activity and high-tech companies in the region. Tech Valley then evolved into a 19-county region in eastern New York stretching from the Canadian-US border to the northern suburbs of the city of New York. The 19 counties were Albany, Clinton, Columbia, Dutchess, Essex, Franklin, Fulton, Greene, Hamilton, Herkimer, Montgomery, Orange, Rensselaer, Saratoga, Schenectady, Schoharie, Ulster, Warren, and Washington. That region was 15,637 square miles, about 270 miles north–south at its longest and about 80 miles east–west at its widest. In 2010, those 19 counties had a population estimate in 2010 of 2,312,952, a 9.2 percent increase over the 2000 census; population density was 148 people/sq. mile. 51 percent of the population was female, with 48.2 percent male. 88.5 percent of the population was White, 6.2 percent Black, 4.9 percent Latino, 1.5 percent Asian, with a median age of 37.5 years.

From the inception of the name, the Chamber stated that it would not limit the label of Tech Valley to just the Capital District; rather, Tech Valley was envisioned as running from IBM's Westchester County plants and headquarters north to Saratoga Springs and west up the Mohawk Valley. Early businesses that used the Tech Valley name helped spread the word, businesses such as Albany Molecular Research Inc. (AMRI) who used the phrase in its job recruitment material, MapInfo Corporation, Tech Valley Communications, Tech Valley Office Interiors, and Tech Valley Homes Real Estate. The first use of the phrase by a business may have been the accounting firm Urbach, Kahn, & Werlin in 1998, which put the Tech Valley name and logo on its postage meter, shortly before that the Chamber had begun instituting a new telephone greeting, "Albany-Colonie Chamber. Tech Valley. May I help you". Also in 1998, Rupprecht & Patashnick put "Made in New York's Tech Valley" stickers on all its air quality sensors for the Environmental Protection Agency's (EPA) national monitoring network. In 2000, Tech Valley license plates became available, with three numbers and the letters TEC, for a $34.50 fee, they were the first plates in New York that had a website on them- techvalley.org.

Initially, the name Tech Valley was derided as over-enthusiastic self-boosterism, but SEMATECH's decision in 2002 to relocate its headquarters to the University at Albany, SUNY began Tech Valley's rise in the public's perception. In 2004, however, when Bill Gates was asked by an Albany Times Union reporter what he thought about Tech Valley, he responded that he had no idea where that was; two years later though, $400,000 from the Bill and Melinda Gates Foundation was used to fund the Tech Valley High School.

=== Luring a chip-fab plant ===
The goal of luring a computer chip fabrication plant (chip fab) was one of the earliest goals of, and reasons underlying, the Tech Valley name. The plan to get a chip fab to the Capital District predates the Tech Valley slogan. In 1997, New York set out submissions for possible chip fab sites that it could whittle to 10 sites around the state that would be pre-approved and pre-permitted for a chip plant. Years before that the Rensselaer Polytechnic Institute's RPI Tech Park had been visited by semiconductor companies, but they had chosen not to build. The renewed interest by the region in luring them was spurred by the research centers and training of specialists for the industry by area colleges such as the University at Albany, Rensselaer Polytechnic Institute, and Hudson Valley Community College. Responding to the state's request for potential sites, Rensselaer County proposed the same RPI Tech Park site; Schenectady County proposed two sites, one of which was in Hillside Industrial Park in Niskayuna; Saratoga County proposed two sites; and Albany County proposed three sites, two in Bethlehem and one in Guilderland. The state ultimately decided on 13 sites it would aggressively promote, most of which were in Tech Valley. As one of the thirteen sites chosen, the RPI Tech Park site originally met little opposition from the town of North Greenbush in which it sat. As time progressed opposition grew in response to concerns about potential impacts on traffic and the environment. The RPI Tech Park site, which by October 1999 had become one of only nine sites still being marketed by the state, ended when the North Greenbush town council voted to terminate the review process. A site in Wallkill, Orange County was the first site in Tech Valley and in the entire state to receive pre-approval for a chip fab.

In 2002, the Saratoga Economic Development Corporation (SEDC) began to tout its proposed tech park, to be named the Luther Forest Technology Campus, in Malta, New York, along the Adirondack Northway within Saratoga County, as a site for a chip plant. It would be there that GlobalFoundries, a spin-off of Advanced Micro Devices (AMD), decided to build a $4.2 billion chip fab, ground breaking was in July 2009. The State of New York gave nearly $1.4 billion in cash and tax incentives, the largest such package in state history. New York's incentive package was the same as that offered by Russia, China, and Brazil; though it was not the deciding factor it meant that any region not offering the package was out of contention for the fab. The deciding factor on picking Tech Valley was the $5 billion College of Nanoscale Science and Engineering at the SUNY Polytechnic Institute and the resulting "high-tech ecosystem" put in place during Governor George Pataki's administration. Subsequently, in April 2021, GlobalFoundries, a company specializing in the semiconductor industry, moved its headquarters from Silicon Valley, California to its most advanced semiconductor-chip manufacturing facility in Malta, Saratoga County, New York.

== Tech Valley Chamber Coalition ==
The Tech Valley Chamber Coalition is an organization that is made up of 24 local chambers of commerce from 19 counties of Tech Valley. Those 24 chambers represent over 21,000 businesses, schools, and organizations that employ more than 531,000 workers. It was formed in June 2002 and manages the Tech Valley Portal, and publishes an annual publication called Images of Tech Valley.

The 24 local chambers are-

- Adirondack Regional Chamber of Commerce
- Adirondacks Speculator Region Chamber of Commerce
- Albany-Colonie Regional Chamber of Commerce
- Bethlehem Chamber of Commerce
- Chamber of Schenectady County
- Chamber of Southern Saratoga County
- Colonie Chamber of Commerce
- Columbia County Chamber of Commerce
- Dutchess County Regional Chamber of Commerce
- Fulton County Regional Chamber of Commerce and Industry
- Greater Greenwich Chamber of Commerce
- Greater Southern Dutchess Chamber of Commerce
- Greene County Chamber of Commerce
- Guilderland Chamber of Commerce
- Herkimer County Chamber of Commerce
- Mechanicville/Stillwater Area Chamber of Commerce
- Montgomery County Chamber of Commerce
- New Paltz Regional Chamber of Commerce
- Orange County Chamber of Commerce
- Plattsburgh-North Country Chamber of Commerce
- Rensselaer County Regional Chamber of Commerce
- Schoharie County Chamber of Commerce
- Ulster County Chamber of Commerce
- Whitehall Chamber of Commerce

== Organizations that use the Tech Valley name ==
- Tech Valley Communications (1999)
- Tech Valley Homes Real Estate (2001)
- Tech Valley Angel Network (2001)
- Tech Valley Chamber Coalition (2002)
- Tech Valley Technologies (2003)
- Tech Valley Office Interiors (2005)
- Tech Valley Exotic Dance Emporium
- Tech Valley High School (2007)
- Tech Valley Talent
- Leadership Tech Valley
- Tech Valley Patent, LLC (2011)
- Tech Valley Center of Gravity (2012)
- StartUp Tech Valley (2013)
- Tech Valley Game Space (2014)
- FIRST NY Tech Valley Regional Robotics Competition (2014)
- Tech Valley Machine Learning, Data Science, and AI Meetup (2016)
- Tech Newbies in Tech Valley Meetup (2017)
- NetSquared Tech Valley (2018)

== See also ==
- BioValley
- Silicon Alley
- Silicon Hills
- Silicon Valley
