= Silicon Hills =

- Tech hub
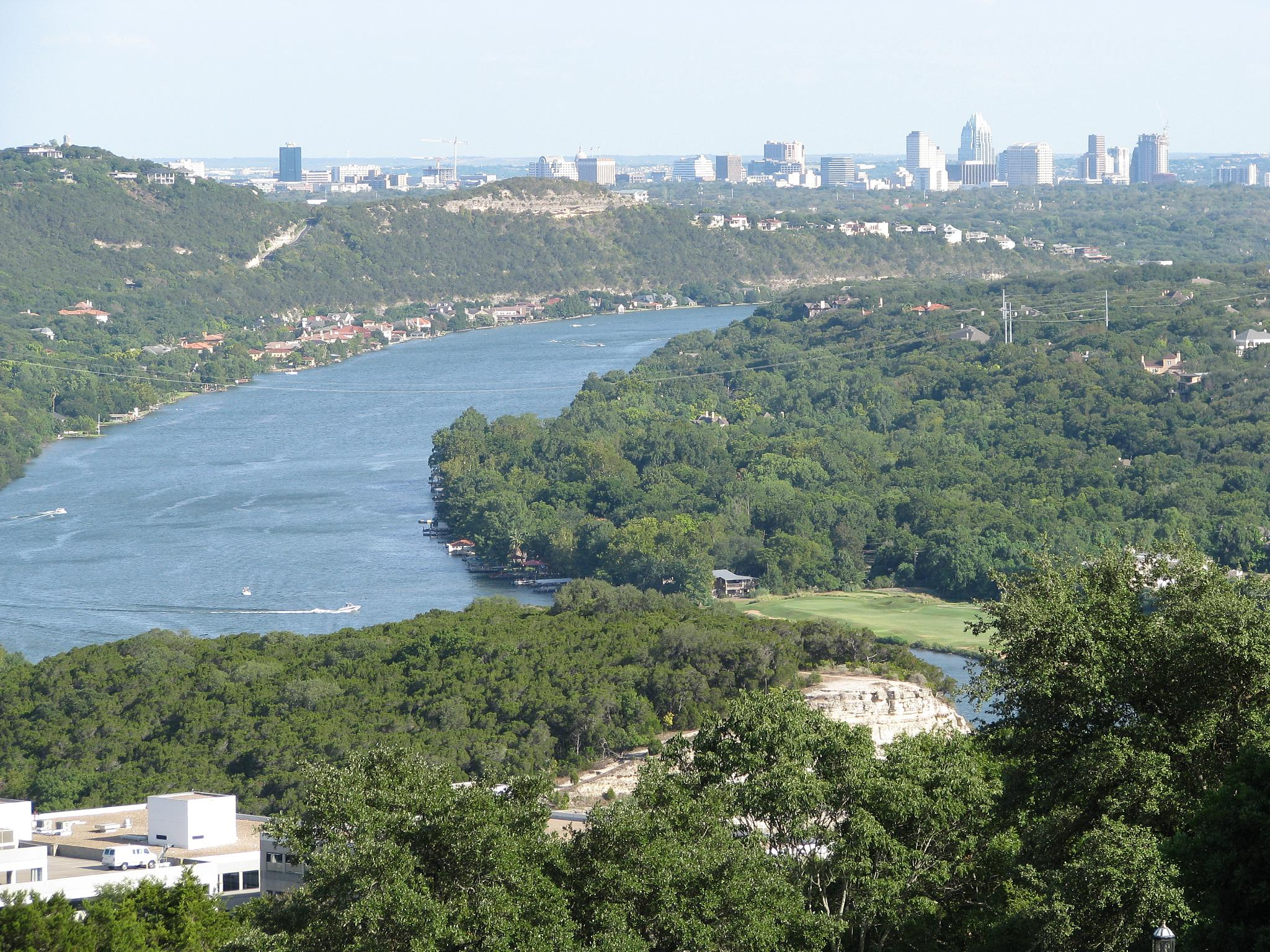

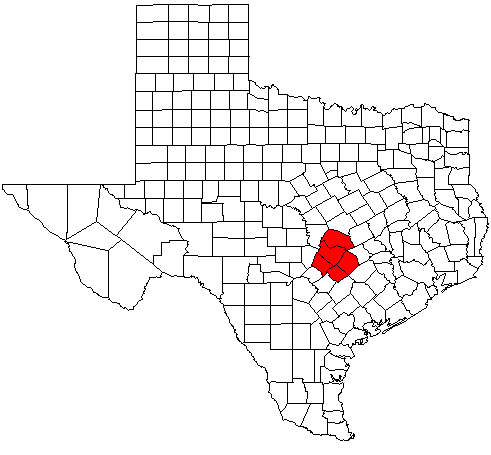
- Country: United States
- State: Texas
- City: Austin

Silicon Hills is a nickname for the tech hub comprising a collection of high-tech companies in the Austin metropolitan area in the U.S. state of Texas. Silicon Hills has been a nickname for Austin since the mid-1990s. The name is analogous to Silicon Valley, but refers to the hilly terrain on the west side of Austin. High tech industries in the area include enterprise software, semiconductors, corporate R&D, biotechnology, the video game industry, and a variety of startup companies.

Technology companies with offices in the area include Advanced Micro Devices, Amazon, Apple, ARM Holdings, Cisco, eBay, Meta Platforms, Alphabet, IBM, Indeed, Intel, NXP Semiconductors, PayPal, Procore, Silicon Labs, Tenstorrent, Texas Instruments, Oracle Corporation, Visa, VMWare, and many others. Dell's worldwide headquarters are located in Round Rock, a suburb of Austin.

== History ==
Austin's tech industry began during World War II, with defense research conducted at the University of Texas. Austin's first tech startup, the defense electronics contractor Tracor, was founded in 1962 by University of Texas researchers. It would become Austin's first publicly-traded company to be listed on the Fortune 500. Thanks to recruitment efforts by the Austin Chamber of Commerce starting in the 50s, a number of tech companies began to locate in Austin. In 1967, the city was chosen by IBM for the location of a new factory producing Selectric typewriters. By 1974, Motorola, Texas Instruments, and Westinghouse had factories in Austin. Rapid growth began in the 80s, when MCC and SEMATECH, two major electronics research consortia, were headquartered in Austin. In 1984, 3M Company moved its research and development division to Austin. The same year, Dell was founded by University of Texas freshman Michael Dell, and would eventually become the largest global producer of personal computers.

== Venture capital, incubators and accelerators ==
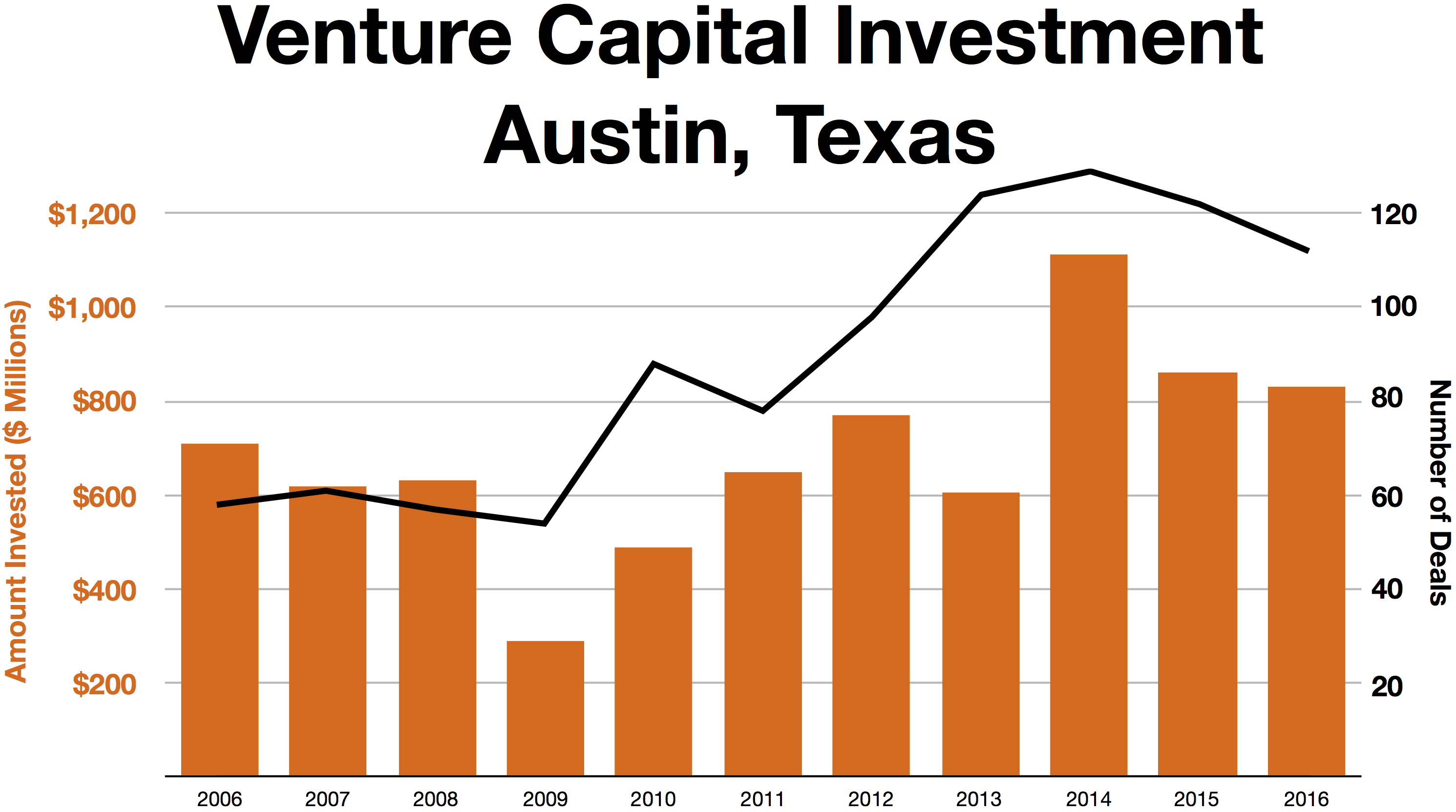
Austin Venture capital investment over time

Austin was one of the top areas for venture capital with investors investing $621 million in 2013 (43% of that went to software and semiconductor firms). Some venture capital investors include Austin Ventures, Central Texas Angels Network, Genesis UT, and Tritium Partners. There are at least 15 startup incubators as well, including: Capital Factory, Austin Technology Incubator, DivInc, Founder's Institute, Tarmac and the IC^{2} Institute (the incubator for the University of Texas at Austin). Additionally, Austin houses several startup accelerators including Sputnik ATX venture-accelerator, Tech Stars, and Mass Challenge TX.

== List of tech companies with a presence in the Austin area ==
- AMD
- Adobe
- Amazon
- Apple
- Applied Materials
- Arm Holdings
- AT&T
- Atlassian
- BigCommerce
- Bazaarvoice
- BioWare
- Blizzard Entertainment
- Bold Commerce
- Buffalo Technology
- Bumble
- Cirrus Logic
- Cisco Systems
- Cloudera
- Cyc
- Dell
- Dropbox
- eBay
- Electronic Arts
- Facebook
- Flextronics
- Freescale Semiconductor
- General Motors
- Google
- Honeywell
- Hewlett-Packard
- HomeAway
- Hoover's
- HostGator
- John Deere
- IBM
- Indeed
- Infineon (formerly Spansion)
- Informatica
- Intel Corporation
- Magento
- Microsoft
- Main Street Hub
- National Instruments
- Nokia
- Nvidia
- Nintendo
- NXP Semiconductors
- Oracle
- PayPal
- Planview
- Polycom
- Pushnami
- Qualcomm
- Rackspace
- Rapid7
- Redgate Software
- Resideo
- RetailMeNot
- Roku
- Rooster Teeth
- SurveyMonkey
- Samsung Group
- Silicon Laboratories
- Smith & Nephew
- SolarWinds
- SpaceX
- SparkCognition
- Tableau
- Talroo
- Tenstorrent
- Tesla Inc.
- Troux Technologies
- United Devices
- Unity Technologies
- Virtual Group
- Visa
- VMware
- WP Engine
- Xerox
- Zynga
- Zaiten

== See also ==
- BioValley
- Dell Medical School
- List of places with "Silicon" names
- Silicon Alley
- Silicon Valley
- Silicon Wadi
- Tech Valley
- SXSW (South by Southwest)
- University of Texas at Austin
- Austin Community College District
- United States Army Futures Command
