= Charmin =

American toilet paper brand from Procter & Gamble

- Product type: Toilet paper
- Current owner: Procter & Gamble
- Country: United States
- Introduced: 1928; 98 years ago
- Related brands: Bounty, Puffs, Pampers
- Markets: North America
- Ambassador: Mr. Whipple (Dick Wilson)
- Tagline: "Enjoy the go"
- Website: charmin.com

Charmin (/ˈʃɑːrmɪn/ SHAR-min) is a brand of toilet paper that was launched in 1928. It is currently owned by Procter & Gamble.

== History ==
The Charmin name was first created on April 19, 1928, by the Hoberg Paper Company in Green Bay, Wisconsin. In 1950, Hoberg changed its name to Charmin Paper Company and continued to produce bath tissue, paper napkins, and other paper products. Procter & Gamble (P&G) acquired Charmin Paper Company in 1957. Charmin Ultra was originally called White Cloud until 1993.

In 2008, P&G sold the European operations and product line to SCA, where it was renamed to Cushelle.

== Advertising ==
The manufacturer originally wanted to emphasize the product's softness, but did not know how to convey the idea of that physical sensation on television. The company's advertising agency suggested that shoppers be encouraged to squeeze the product in stores like a grocery shopper would squeeze a tomato to assess its softness, however, there was some concern that retailers would object to customers manhandling their merchandise and thus damaging it before purchase. The problem was solved with the concept that the handling would be actively discouraged by a comic antagonistic retailer in the advertisements. In an advertising campaign that lasted over twenty years, American advertisements featured actor Dick Wilson, playing the fictional grocer Mr. George Whipple. Mr. Whipple told his customers: "Please don't squeeze the Charmin!", emphasizing its softness in more than 500 advertisements between 1964 and 1985, and later returning in 1999–2000.

The country song "Don't Squeeze My Sharmon", which was a minor hit for Charlie Walker in 1967, was inspired by the ad campaign for Charmin.

=== Mascots ===
In 1928, the logo mascot was a female silhouette, supplemented by a baby in 1953, replacing the woman by 1956.

In advertisements, Mr. Whipple was replaced eventually with "The Charmin Bear", created by D'Arcy Masius Benton & Bowles in Britain and introduced to the United States in 2000. The original bear was not 3D-animated and had a light brown/tan color.

In 2001, three cubs were added to the family, and by 2007, a blue bear was introduced for the "soft" brand and a red bear for the "strong" brand. The bears later became part of the packaging, replacing the baby in 2004.

The new animated advertising campaign was called "Call of Nature".

In 2010, the company changed the logo to add flecks of toilet paper to the bears in the logo.

The "Charmin Bears" is a collective family of parents and children. Initially there was just one family of brown bears, with Leonard the Bear accompanied by Molly, Bill, Amy and Dylan. This was later split into distinct families of bears: five blue ones called the "Charmin Ultra Soft Family" and five red ones called the "Charmin Ultra Strong Family". The commercials from 2000 to 2014 were animated by Joanna Quinn.

== Environmental impact ==
In February 2009, Greenpeace advised consumers not to use Charmin toilet paper, stating that it is bad for the environment.

As of 2018, Charmin is certified by the Forest Stewardship Council and the Rainforest Alliance.

The NRDC and stand.earth issued a report in 2019 saying that Charmin toilet paper was still being manufactured almost exclusively from forest fiber, much of it sourced from Canada's boreal forest. By November 2019, NRDC claimed that 201,000 people had signed its petition to Procter & Gamble asking the company to change its practices.

== Design ==
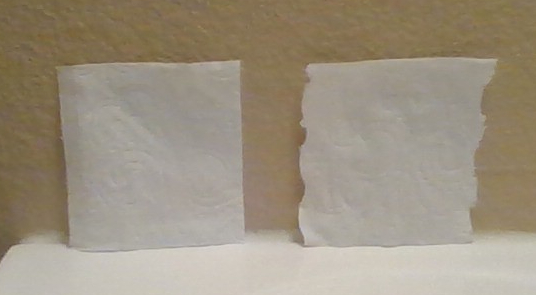
Comparison of former (left) and current (right) designs of Charmin Ultra Soft toilet paper

ON October 2, 2023, it was announced that P&G would introduce a new design of Charmin Ultra Soft toilet paper, this time with scalloped edges in response to complaints about the former toilet paper design—which was composed of squares with straight edges—not tearing smoothly.
