= Tom Watson (journalist) =

American journalist (born 1962)

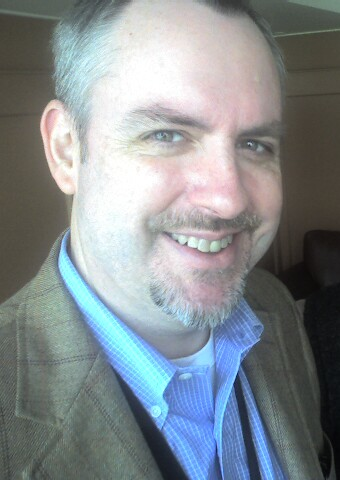
Tom Watson in 2009

Tom Watson (born February 21, 1962) is an American author, consultant and journalist.

Watson was born in Yonkers, New York.

He is the author of CauseWired: Plugging In, Getting Involved, Changing the World (Wiley, 2008), president of CauseWired, a consulting company he founded, and a columnist for Forbes.
